= List of first minority male lawyers and judges in Massachusetts =

This is a list of the first minority male lawyer(s) and judge(s) in Massachusetts. It includes the year in which the men were admitted to practice law (in parentheses). Also included are men who achieved other distinctions such becoming the first in their state to graduate from law school or become a political figure.

== Firsts in state history ==
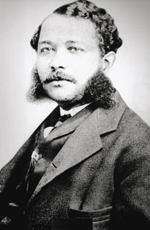
George Lewis Ruffin: First African American male law graduate (1869) and judge in (1883) Massachusetts

=== Law school ===
- First African American male law graduate: George Lewis Ruffin (1869) in 1869

=== Lawyers ===
- First African American male: Macon Bolling Allen (1845)
- First African American male to try and win a lawsuit in Massachusetts: Robert Morris Sr. (1847)
- First Native American male (Mashpee Wampanoag Tribe): Nelson D. Simons (1925)
- First Chinese American male: Harry Dow (1929)
- First Greek-born male: James Liacos (1952)
- First Latino American male: Lazar Lowinger (1962)
- First undocumented male: Antonio Massa Viana (c. 2014)

=== Law clerk ===
- First African American male (Massachusetts Supreme Court): Herbert O. Reid in 1945

=== State judges ===
- First African American male (justice of the peace): Macon Bolling Allen in 1847
- First African American male (judge): George Lewis Ruffin (1869) in 1883
- First Native American male (Great and General Court of Massachusetts): Watson F. Hammond in 1885
- First male judge of Italian descent: Frank J. Leveroni in 1906
- First Chinese American male (justice of the peace): Charles K. Shue in 1908
- First Jewish American male: Abraham K. Cohen in 1912
- First Portuguese American male judge: Frank M. Silvia in 1920
- First Greek American male judge: John C. Pappas in 1935
- First African American male (juvenile court): G. Bruce Robinson in 1948
- First African American male (superior court): Edward Gourdin in 1958
- First Syrian Lebanese American male: Elias Shamon during the 1960s
- First Hispanic American male (Cuban American): Charles A. Grabau (1974) from 1979-1985
- First African American male (Massachusetts Housing Court): John G. Martin in 1984
- First Puerto Rican male: Luis G. Perez (1980) in 1987
- First Asian American male: Richard J. Chin (1974) from 1989-1993
- First openly LGBT male: Dermot Meagher from 1989-2006
- First African American male (Presiding Judge; district court): Elwood S. McKenney
- First Greek American male (Chief Justice; Supreme Judicial Court of Massachusetts): Paul J. Liacos in 1989
- First Haitian American male: Jacques Leroy in 1994
- First African American male (Justice; Chief Justice of the Supreme Judicial Court of Massachusetts): Roderick L. Ireland (1975) in 1997 and 2000 respectively
- First Portuguese American male (Massachusetts Appeals Court): Phillip Rapoza in 1998
- First Albanian American male: Robert N. Tochka in 2002
- First Hispanic American male (administrative law judge; Massachusetts Department of Industrial Accidents): Omar Hernández in 2011
- First Portuguese American male (probate judge): Armand Fernandes, Jr. in 2011
- First Jewish American (Massachusetts Supreme Judicial Court; Chief Justice): Ralph Gants in 2014
- First Armenian American male (Massachusetts Superior Court): Raffi Yessayan in 2015
- First Indian American male (Massachusetts Housing Court): Neil Sherring in 2018

=== Federal judge ===
- First African American male (federal judge; United States District Court for the District of Massachusetts): David Sutherland Nelson in 1979
- First Asian American male (federal judge; United States District Court for the District of Massachusetts): Myong J. Joun in 2023

=== Attorney General of Massachusetts ===
- First Jewish American male: George Fingold in 1952
- First African American male: Edward Brooke (1948) in 1962

=== Assistant Attorney General of Massachusetts ===
- First African American male: David Sutherland Nelson in 1971

=== Assistant District Attorney ===
- First African American male: John W. Schenck in 1922

=== Massachusetts Bar Association ===
- First African American male (president): Wayne Budd from 1979-1980
- First openly LGBT male (president): Mark Mason in 2006
- First Hispanic American male (president): Robert Harnais in 2015

== Firsts in local history ==
- Robert N. Stevens: First African American male lawyer in Berkshire County, Massachusetts
- Charles R. Alberti: First Italian American male lawyer in Pittsfield, Berkshire County, Massachusetts
- Charles S. Tsouprake: First Greek American male lawyer in New Bedford, Massachusetts [Bristol County, Massachusetts]
- August C. Taveira: First Portuguese American male judge in New Bedford, Massachusetts (1949) [Bristol County, Massachusetts]
- Isaac Borenstein: First Latino American male to serve as a Judge of the Lawrence District Court (1986) [Essex County, Massachusetts]
- José Ángel Navarro III: First Latino male to graduate from Harvard Law School [Middlesex County, Massachusetts]
- George Lewis Ruffin (1869): First African American male to graduate from Harvard Law School [Middlesex County, Massachusetts]
- Gilbert Nelson, Jr. (c. 1968): First African American male lawyer in Middlesex County, New Jersey
- Ronald S. Sullivan, Jr. (1994): First African American male to serve as a faculty dean at Harvard University [Middlesex County, Massachusetts]
- Ralph C. Martin, Jr.: First African American male to serve as the District Attorney for Middlesex County, Massachusetts (1992-2002)
- Andrew Manual Crespo: First Latino American male to serve as the President of the Harvard Law Review [Cambridge, Middlesex County, Massachusetts]
- Paul M. Yee, Jr.: First Asian American male to serve as a Judge of the Quincy District Court (2010) [Norfolk County, Massachusetts]
- Takeo Kikuchi (1877): First Japanese male to graduate from the Boston University School of Law. He would later co-found Chuo University in Tokyo, Japan. [Suffolk County, Massachusetts]
- Nelson D. Simons: First Native American male to graduate from the Suffolk University Law School (1926) [Boston, Suffolk County, Massachusetts]
- Emanuel Hewlett (1877): First African American male to graduate from the Boston University School of Law [Suffolk County, Massachusetts]
- Harry Elam (1951): First African American male appointed as a Judge of the Boston Municipal Court (1971) [Suffolk County, Massachusetts]
- John Ward: First openly LGBT male lawyer in Boston, Massachusetts (1977) [Suffolk County, Massachusetts]
- David Hall: First African American male to serve as the Dean of Northeastern University School of Law (1993)
- Luis G. Perez: First Hispanic American male judge in Worcester County, Massachusetts (1987)

== See also ==
- List of first minority male lawyers and judges in the United States
- Boston Municipal Court

== Other topics of interest ==
- List of first women lawyers and judges in the United States
- List of first women lawyers and judges in Massachusetts
