= Boston Municipal Court =

Trial court in Massachusetts, United States

- (BMC)
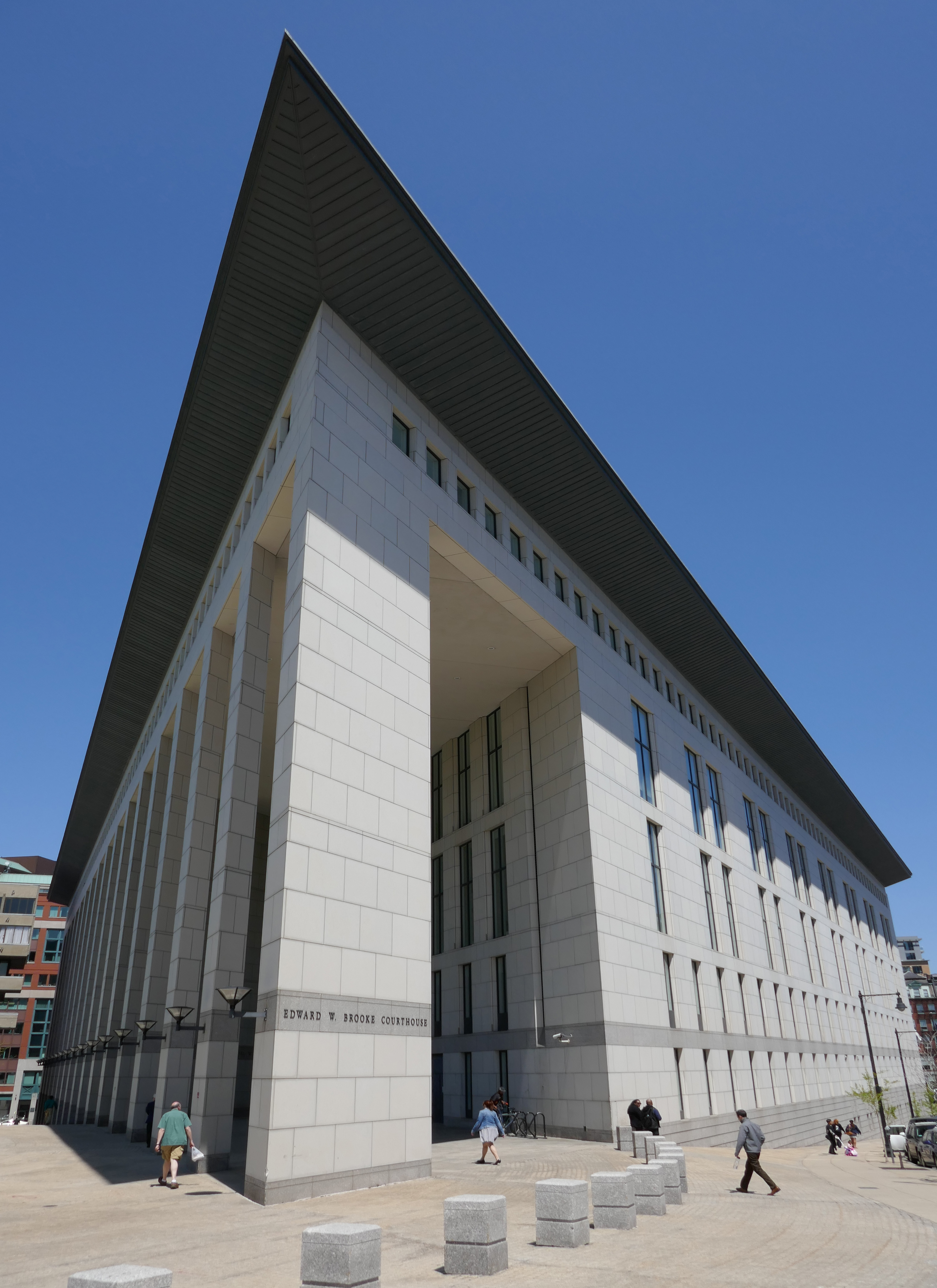
- The Edward W. Brooke Courthouse, 24 New Chardon Street, Boston houses the Administrative Office of the Boston Municipal Court Department and is home to the Central Division.
- Interactive map of Boston Municipal Court
- 42.363007°N 71.061544°W
- Established: February 23, 1822
- Jurisdiction: Boston and Winthrop, Massachusetts
- Location: Boston; Massachusetts
- Coordinates: 42.363007°N 71.061544°W
- Appeals to: Appellate Division of the Boston Municipal Court (Civil); Massachusetts Appeals Court (Criminal)
- Number of positions: 30
- Website: Boston Municipal Court

Chief Justice
- Currently: Tracy-Lee Lyons
- Since: 2024
- Lead position ends: 2028

The Boston Municipal Court (BMC), officially the Boston Municipal Court Department of the Trial Court, is a department of the Trial Court of the Commonwealth of Massachusetts, United States. The court hears criminal, civil, mental health, restraining orders, and other types of cases. The court also has an appellate division (composed of justices that sit in rotating panels of three) which reviews questions of law that arise from civil matters filed in the eight divisions of the department.

== History ==
=== Boston Police Court and Justices' Court for the County of Suffolk ===
The court's history dates to 1822, the year in which Boston was chartered as a city. Two courts were established, both served by the same judges: the Boston Police Court, to hear criminal matters, and the Justices' Court for the County of Suffolk, to address civil claims. The two courts remained distinct until 1860 when the Justices' Court was abolished, and its civil jurisdiction transferred to the Police Court.

=== Municipal Court of the City of Boston/Boston Municipal Court Department ===
In 1866, the Police Court was abolished, and its records and jurisdiction transferred to the newly created Municipal Court of the City of Boston. In 1978, the Massachusetts Court Reform Act established the Boston Municipal Court Department as one of the seven departments of the Trial Court of Massachusetts. In 2003, the department expanded to eight divisions, after it was given authority by the Massachusetts Legislature over seven other Boston-based courts.

=== Probation pioneer ===
The Boston Police Court has the distinction of participating in the initial development of the modern concept of probation in the United States. In 1841 John Augustus, the "Father of Probation", persuaded a judge in the Police Court to give him custody of a convicted "common drunkard" for a brief period. The offender was ordered to appear in court three weeks later for sentencing. He returned to court accompanied by Augustus a sober man, his appearance and demeanor dramatically changed. The judge was so impressed with his sober and dignified appearance that he waived the usual penalty of 30 days in jail and instead levied a fine of one cent plus court costs ($3.76).

Augustus thus began an 18-year career as a volunteer probation officer, subsequently credited with founding the investigations process, one of three main concepts of modern probation, the other two being intake and supervision. Augustus was also the first to apply the term "probation" to his method of treating offenders from the Latin verb "probare": to prove, to test.

In 1878 a law was passed by the legislature authorizing the Mayor of Boston to appoint a probation officer for Suffolk County. The continued success of the system led to its extension to district and police courts in other towns and cities in the state. In 1898 a law was passed extending the probation system by authorizing the appointment of probation officers by the Superior Court.

== Jurisdiction ==
The jurisdiction of the court is the cities of Boston and Winthrop, Massachusetts, and the types of criminal cases that may be filed include most felonies and misdemeanors that do not require a state prison sentence, as well as felonies punishable by a sentence of up to 5 years. If a state prison sentence is mandated, the Court may conduct probable cause hearings to determine whether offenses will be bound over to the Superior Court. Magistrates conduct hearings to issue criminal complaints and arrest warrants, and to determine whether there is probable cause to detain persons arrested without a warrant. Both judges and magistrates issue criminal and administrative search warrants.

The types of civil cases that may be filed in the BMC include contract, tort and replevin actions in which the likely recovery does not exceed $50,000; (Note: "Notwithstanding the limitation...courts may proceed with actions for money damages in any amount in summary process actions." Massachusetts General Laws, Chapter 218, Section 19.) small claims cases in which the amount in controversy does not exceed $7,000 (Note: "...however, that said dollar limitation shall not apply to an action for property damage caused by a motor vehicle, and for a review of judgments upon such claims when justice so requires." Massachusetts General Laws, Chapter 218, Section 21.) (initially tried before a magistrate, with a defense right of appeal either to a judge or jury); summary process/eviction cases; supplementary process cases; mental health matters (including involuntary commitments and medication orders, and supervision of criminal defendants committed for mental observation or have been found incompetent to stand trial, or after an insanity acquittal); abuse prevention/restraining orders and harassment prevention orders; civil motor vehicle infraction appeals (initially tried before a magistrate, with a right of appeal to a judge and a final appeal to the appellate division); paternity and support actions; and violations of certain city ordinances and by-laws. In certain circumstances, civil actions may be filed in the BMC even if the parties do not reside or have a usual place of business in Boston or Winthrop, or if the defendant resides or does business outside the state.

The court has jurisdiction for review of findings of the Massachusetts State Police Trial Board and equitable jurisdiction in lead poisoning prevention; landlord interference with quiet enjoyment or failure to provide utilities; sanitary code; and residential nuisances. The court also has jurisdiction to review government agency actions, such as unemployment compensation appeals, victim of violent crime compensation appeals, and firearms license appeals.

== Divisions ==
- Brighton Division
- Central Division
- Charlestown Division
- Dorchester Division
- East Boston Division
- Roxbury Division
- South Boston Division
- West Roxbury Division

== Composition ==
The court consists of a Chief Justice and 30 Associate Justices appointed by the Governor of Massachusetts with the consent of the Governor's Council. The Judges hold office until the mandatory retirement age of seventy. Chief Justice Tracy-Lee Lyons was appointed in 2023, effective January 1, 2024.

=== Judges ===
As of 2024, the court's members are as follows:

Judge	Began active service	Appointed by	Notes
Hon. Tracy-Lee Lyons	2006	Mitt Romney	Chief Justice
Hon. Margaret F. Albertson	2022	Charlie Baker'	First Justice, South Boston
Hon. David J. Breen	2015	Deval Patrick	First Justice, Roxbury
Hon. James W. Coffey	2001	Jane Swift	First Justice, Central appointed to District Court, designated as a BMC judge 2003
Hon. Kathleen E. Coffey	1993	William Weld	First Justice, West Roxbury; Appointed to District Court, designated as a BMC judge 2003
Hon. Debra A. DelVecchio	2014	Deval Patrick	First Justice, East Boston
Hon. David T. Donnelly	2002	Jane Swift	First Justice, Brighton; Appointed to District Court, designated as a BMC judge 2003
Hon. Maureen Flaherty	2021	Charlie Baker	
Hon. Kenneth J. Fiandaca	2008	Deval Patrick	
Hon. John E. Garland	2021	Charlie Baker	
Hon. Lisa Grant	2014	Deval Patrick	First Justice, Charlestown
Hon. Lisa Ann Grant	2014	Deval Patrick	
Hon. Joseph M. Griffin, Jr.	2022	Charlie Baker	
Hon. Thomas S. Kaplanes	2013	Deval Patrick	
Hon. Steven M. Key	2019	Charlie Baker	
Hon. Stephen McClenon	2021	Charlie Baker	
Hon. John E. McDonald, Jr.	2013	Deval Patrick	
Hon. David B. Poole	2008	Deval Patrick	
Hon. Erika Reis	2022	Charlie Baker	
Hon. Roberto Ronquillo, Jr.	2001	Paul Cellucci	Appointed to District Court, designated as a BMC judge 2003 (Chief Justice 2013–2023)
Hon. Richard J. Sinnott	2017	Charlie Baker	
Hon. James M. Stanton	2017	Charlie Baker	
Hon. Mark H. Summerville	1993	William Weld	
Hon. Paul M. Treseler	2019	Charlie Baker	
Hon. Jonathan R. Tynes	2013	Deval Patrick	First Justice, Dorchester
Hon. Samir Zaganjori	2021	Charlie Baker	

=== Chief Justices ===
- John W. Bacon (1866–1871)
- Mellen Chamberlain (1871–1878)
- John Wilder May (1878–1883)
- William E. Parmenter (1883–1902)
- John Freeman Brown (1902–1906)
- Wilfred Bolster (1906–1939)
- F. Delano Putnam (1939–1943)
- Davis B. Keniston (1943–1954)
- Elijah Adlow (1954–1973)
- Jacob Lewiton (1973–1978)
- Harry J. Elam (1978–1983)
- Theodore A. Glynn, Jr. (1983–1986)
- Joseph F. Feeney (1986–1988)
- William J. Tierney (1988–2002)
- Charles R. Johnson (2003–2013) (Acting 2002–2003)
- Roberto Ronquillo, Jr. (2013–2023)
- Tracy-Lee Lyons (2024–)

=== Notable former judges ===
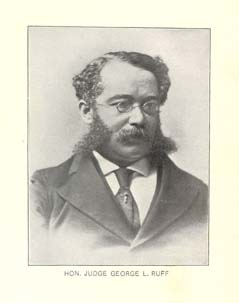
Hon. George Lewis Ruffin

- Jennie Loitman Barron, 1937–1959; first woman to serve as a full-time judge in Massachusetts.
- Matthew Brown, 1962–1972; special justice of the Municipal Court of Boston
- Margaret Burnham, 1977–1982; First African American female judge in Massachusetts
- Richard J. Chin, 1989–1993; first Asian American judge in Massachusetts.
- Joseph DeGuglielmo, 1971–1978, associate justice and former Mayor of Cambridge, Massachusetts
- Harry J. Elam, 1971–1983 (Chief Justice 1978–1983); first African American Chief Justice in Massachusetts, and the first African-American appointee to the BMC.
- Serge Georges Jr., 2013–2020; In 2020, Georges was appointed to the Massachusetts Supreme Judicial Court.
- Linda Giles, 1991–1998; First openly LGBT female appointed as a judge in Massachusetts
- Charles A. Grabau, 1979–1985; first Hispanic judge in Massachusetts.
- Myong J. Joun, 2014–2023; In 2023, Joun was appointed by President Joe Biden to the United States District Court for the District of Massachusetts.
- Dermot Meagher, 1989–2006; first openly gay judge in Massachusetts.
- George A. O'Toole Jr., 1982–1990; In 1995 O'Toole was nominated by President Bill Clinton to a new seat on the United States District Court for the District of Massachusetts. O'Toole presided over the 2015 trial of Dzhokhar Tsarnaev, one of the perpetrators of the Boston Marathon bombing.
- George Lewis Ruffin, 1883–1886; appointed to Municipal Court of Charlestown; first African-American judge in the United States.
- Eleanor C. Sinnott, 2006–2023; First Korean-American judge in Massachusetts
- George Duncan Wells, 1859–1862; resigned his seat and entered the service during the Civil War, died in Strasburg, Virginia on October 13, 1864.
- Mario Umana, 1973–1991

== Specialty sessions ==
Specialty Courts are problem-solving court sessions which provide court-supervised probation and mandated treatment focused on treating the mental health or substance abuse issues underlying criminal behavior. The BMC has the following specialty court sessions:

- Recovery Court
- Homeless Court
- Mental Health Session
- Veterans Treatment Session

== Notable cases ==
- Commonwealth v. Glik No. 0701CR6687 (2007)
- Justices of Boston Municipal Court v. Lydon, 466 U.S. 294 (1984)

== See also ==
- Courts of Massachusetts
- List of courthouses in Boston

== Images ==
Former homes

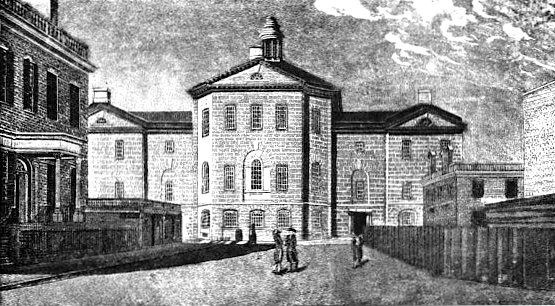
Court house, School Street, Boston (1822–1836)

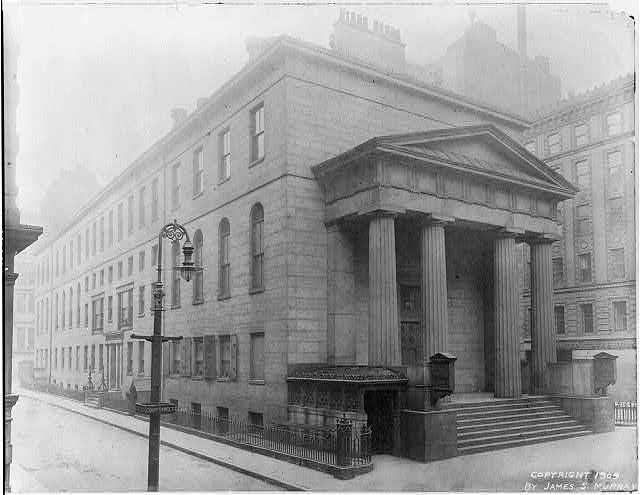
Suffolk County Courthouse, Court Square, Boston (1836–1891)

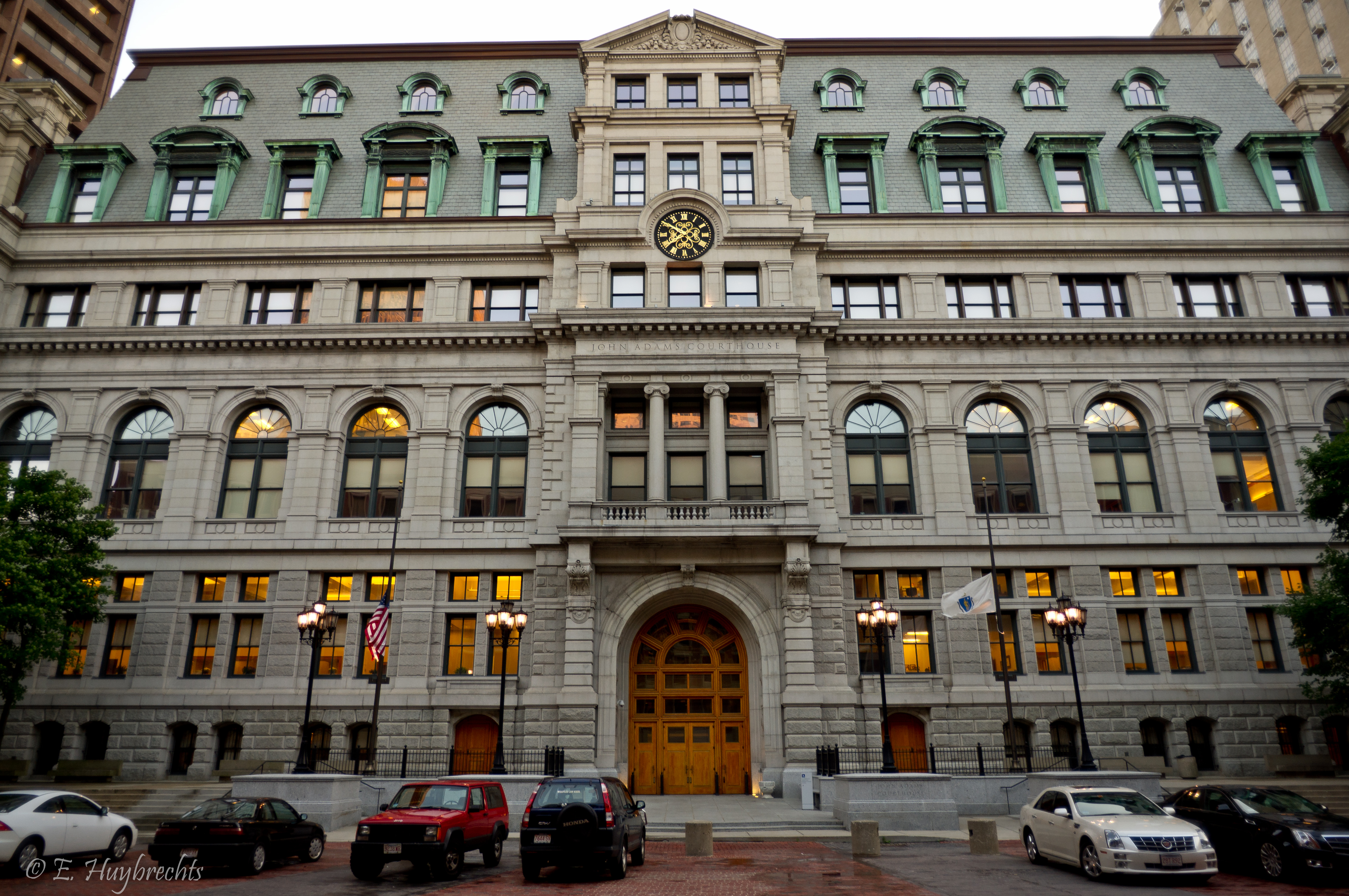
"Old" Suffolk County Courthouse, Pemberton Square, Boston (1891–1936)
Civil Business (1939–2001)

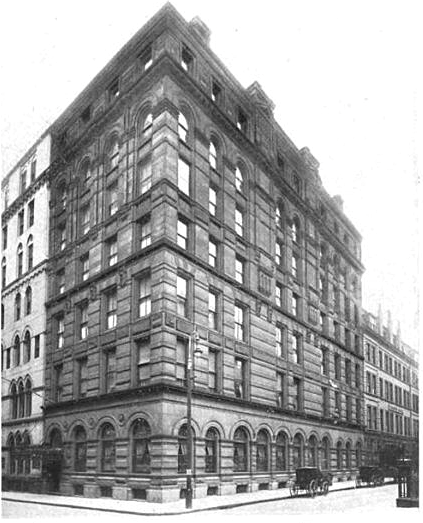
Young's Hotel, Court St., Boston. Temporary while "New" building was under construction. (1936–1939)

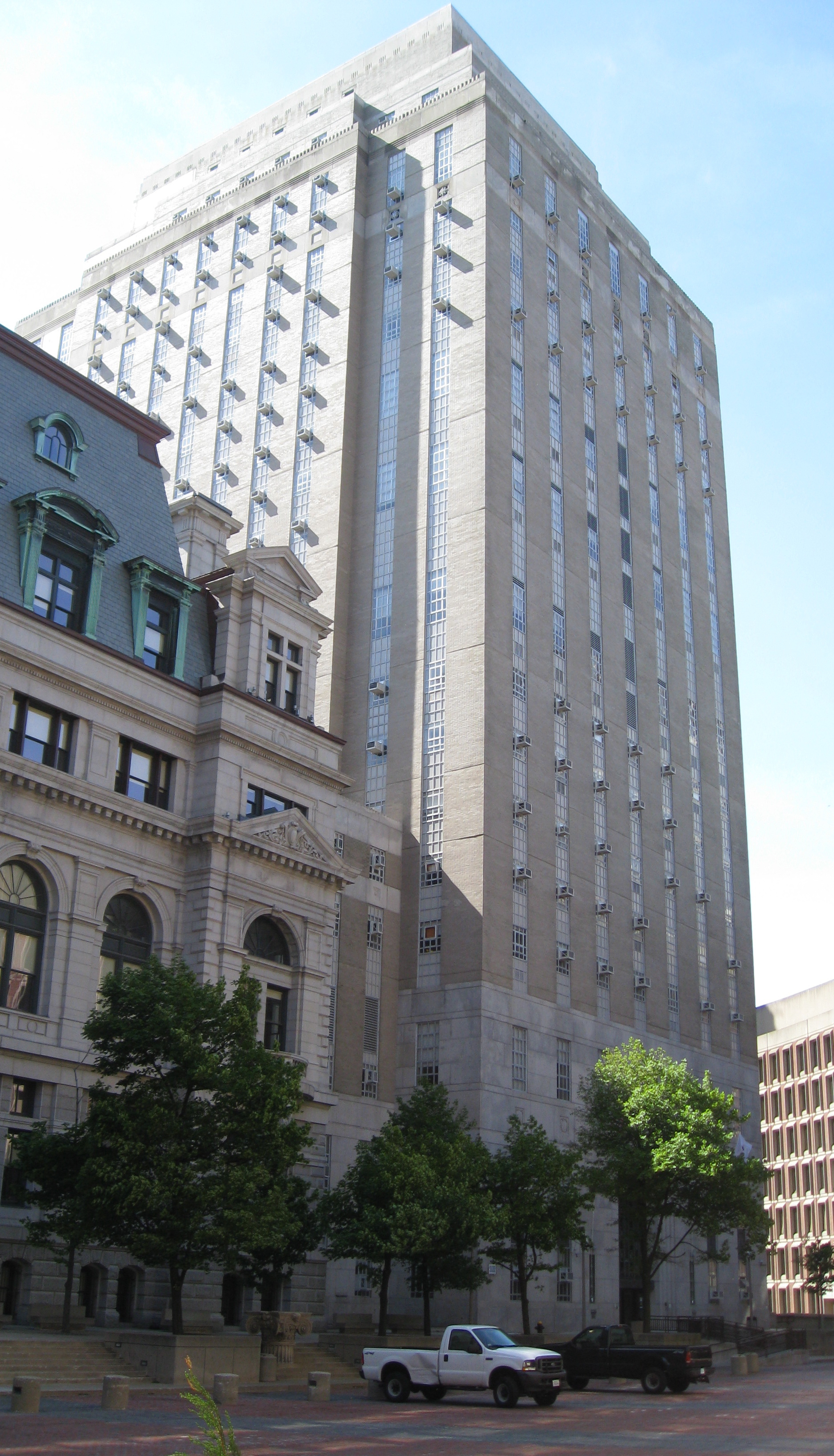
"New" Suffolk County Courthouse, Pemberton Square, Boston.
Criminal Business (1939–2001)

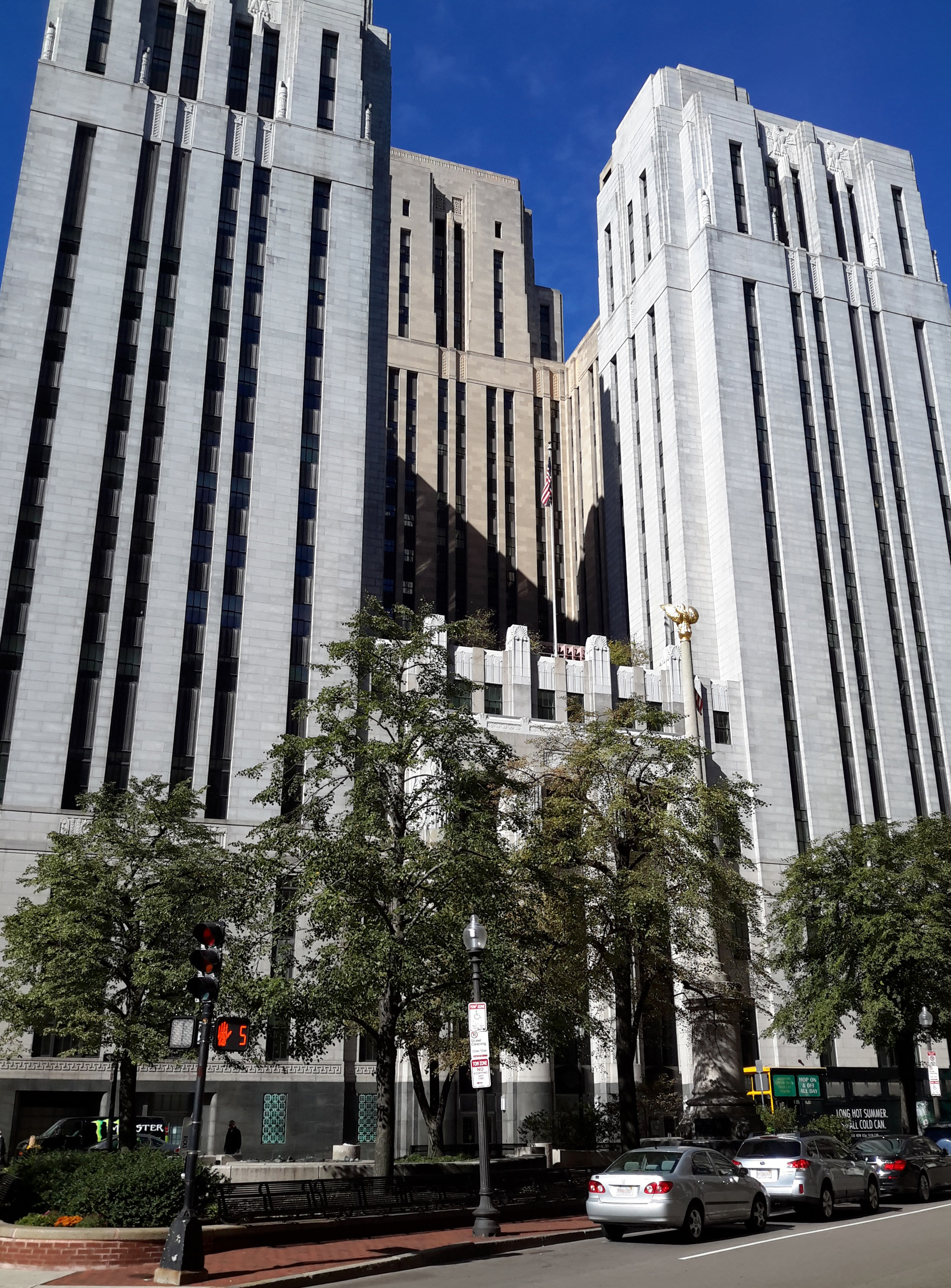
John W. McCormack Post Office and Courthouse, Devonshire Street, Boston (2001–2005)
