= Binge drinking =

Form of excessive alcohol intake

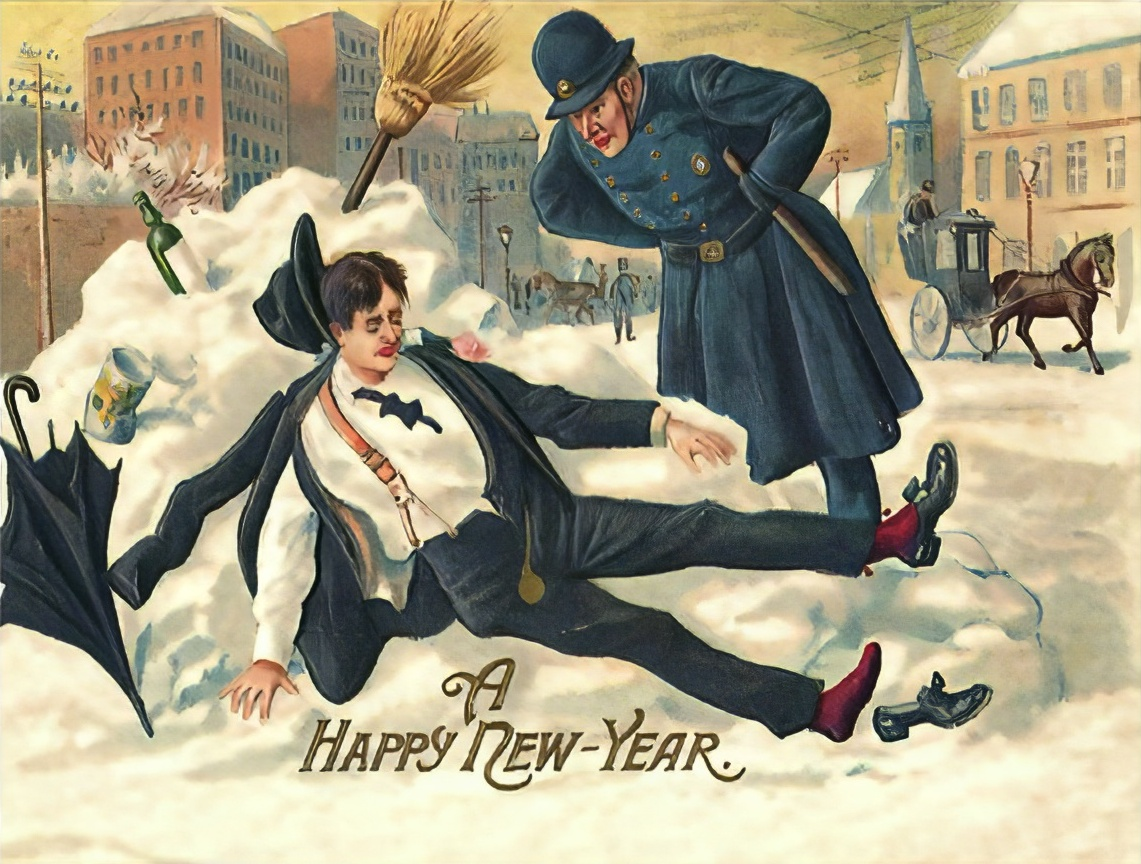
- An early 20th-century postcard New Year hangover
- Specialty: Toxicology, psychiatry

Binge drinking, or heavy episodic drinking, is drinking alcoholic beverages intending to become intoxicated by heavy consumption of alcohol over a short period, but definitions vary considerably.

Binge drinking is a style of drinking that is popular in several countries worldwide, and overlaps somewhat with social drinking since it is often done in groups. The degree of intoxication, however, varies between and within various cultures that engage in this practice. A binge on alcohol can occur over hours, last up to several days, or, in the event of extended abuse, even weeks. Due to the long term effects of alcohol abuse, binge drinking is considered to be a major public health issue.

Binge drinking is more common in males, during adolescence and young adulthood. Heavy regular binge drinking is associated with adverse effects on neurologic, cardiac, gastrointestinal, hematologic, immune, and musculoskeletal organ systems as well as increasing the risk of alcohol induced psychiatric disorders. A 2002 US-based review of literature found that up to one-third of adolescents binge-drink, with 6% reaching the threshold of having an alcohol-related substance use disorder. Approximately one in 25 women binge-drinks during pregnancy, which can lead to fetal alcohol syndrome and fetal alcohol spectrum disorders. Binge drinking during adolescence is associated with traffic accidents and other types of accidents, violent behavior as well as suicide. The more often a child or adolescent binge drinks and the younger they are the more likely that they will develop an alcohol use disorder including alcoholism. A large number of adolescents who binge-drink also consume other psychotropic substances.

Frequent binge drinking can lead to brain damage faster and more severely than chronic drinking (alcoholism). The neurotoxic insults are due to substantial amounts of glutamate which are released and overstimulate the brain as a binge finishes. This results in excitotoxicity, a process which damages or kills neurons (brain cells). Each binge drinking episode immediately assaults the brain; repeat episodes result in accumulating harm. The developing adolescent brain is thought to be particularly susceptible to the neurotoxic effects of binge drinking, with some evidence of brain damage occurring from drinking more than 10 or 11 drinks once or twice per month. A 2020 study found that even a single episode of binge drinking can lead to atrophy of the brain's corpus callosum, from which damage was still detectable by an MRI scanner five weeks later. With prolonged abstinence neurogenesis occurs which can potentially reverse the damage from alcohol abuse.

== Definitions ==
Stolle, Sack and Thomasius define binge drinking as episodic excessive drinking. There is no worldwide consensus on how many drinks constitute a "binge".

In the United States, the term has been described in academic research to mean consuming five or more standard drinks (male), or four or more drinks (female), over a two-hour period. In 2015, the US Centers for Disease Control and Prevention, citing the National Institute on Alcohol Abuse and Alcoholism, defines binge drinking as "a pattern of drinking that brings a person's blood alcohol concentration (BAC) to 0.08 percent or above. This typically happens when men consume five or more drinks, and when women consume four or more drinks, in about two hours." and estimated that about 16% of American adults met these criteria at least four times per month. One 2001 definition from the publication Psychology of Addictive Behavior states that five drinks for men and four drinks for women must be consumed on one occasion at least once in a two-week period for it to be classed as binge drinking. This is colloquially known as the "5/4 definition", and depending on the source, the timeframe can vary.

In the United Kingdom, binge drinking is defined by one academic publication as drinking more than twice the daily limit, that is, drinking eight units or more for men or six units or more for women (roughly equivalent to five or four American standard drinks, respectively).

In Australia, binge drinking is also known as risky single occasion drinking (RSOD) and can be classified by the drinking of seven or more standard drinks (by males) and five or more standard drinks (by females) within a single day. When BEACH (Bettering the Evaluation and Care of Health) conducted a study which gathered information of people over the age of 18, it defined binge drinkers as those who consumed six or more standard drinks on one occasion whether that be weekly or monthly.

In the Republic of Ireland, the HSE defines binge drinking as more than six units of alcohol in one sitting for both sexes.

Researchers also classify particularly severe binge drinking, called high-intensity drinking, as consuming at least 8 to 12 drinks in a day. Although most people do not drink or do not exceed moderate levels of alcohol consumption, about half of binge drinkers engage in high-intensity drinking at least some times. High-intensity drinking is associated with unhealthful behaviors such as front-loading (trying to get drunk as fast as possible) and with harmful outcomes such as impaired driving and a higher risk of dying that day.

Other, less common definitions rely on blood alcohol concentration (BAC). For example, the National Institute on Alcohol Abuse and Alcoholism (NIAAA) defines the term "binge drinking" as a pattern of drinking that brings a person's blood alcohol concentration (BAC) to 0.08 percent or above. Whatever the numerical definition used, heavy drinking or rapid consumption over a short period of time with the intention of becoming intoxicated is often implied when the term is used colloquially, since four or five drinks consumed over the course of a whole day and as an accompaniment to meals will not have the same effects as the same amount consumed over a couple of hours on an empty stomach.

An alternative colloquial term for binge drinking, "going on a bender", formerly implied a drinking spree of several days.

== Causes ==
Culture as well as peer pressure play an important role in driving binge drinking. An increased risk of binge drinking in adulthood has been linked to having a grade point average of B or lower and to being unmarried.

A 2007 survey summarised the reasons given for binge drinking by a group of 15- to 16-year-olds in Germany as including:

- "It's really fun" (76% of respondents)
- "I feel more sociable" (65%)
- "I feel happy" (51%)
- "I feel relaxed" (51%)
- "I forget my problems" (41%)

Other causes include feeling more grown-up and fitting in with peers, and increasing the chance of sexual encounters. Some also drink to alleviate psychological stress or anxiety. Research on interpersonal violence focused on mechanisms of victimization and perpetration (specifically stalking, harassment, sexual assault, and teen dating violence) among adolescents reported a significantly higher proportion of teenagers endorsing depressed mood and engagement in binge drinking among those subjected to victimization.

Semi-structured interviews were carried out with 64 14- to 17-year-olds who had an experience of binge drinking. These interviews found that motivations included social facilitation, which was ease in social situations, individual benefits such as getting a 'buzz', and influences of peer pressure and social norms.

Risk factors for binge drinking among adolescents include: low socioeconomic status, large amount of disposable (pocket) money, sensation and novelty seeking, low self-control, delinquency and having delinquent friends. Other risk factors include: using alcohol as a coping strategy for emotional problems (more common in adolescent girls), excessive drinking among peers, poor relationship with parents, alcohol abuse by parents. Genetic conditions combined with a background of negative environmental factors increase the harmful use of alcohol. Additionally, the risk-taking behavior associated with adolescence promotes binge drinking.

== Health effects ==
Acute intoxication, such as binge drinking and alcoholism, is known to be a potent risk factor for suicide. Binge drinking is also associated with an increased risk of unplanned and unprotected sex, unplanned pregnancies, and an increased risk of HIV infection. 10% of women and 19% of men have reported being assaulted as a result of alcohol. Males who drink more than 35 units of alcohol per week report being physically hurt as a result of alcohol, and 15% report physically hurting others as a result of their drinking. Almost 16% of binge drinkers report being taken advantage of sexually, and 8% report taking advantage of another person sexually as a result of alcohol within a one-year period. Heavy drinkers cause approximately 183,000 rapes and sexual assaults, 197,000 robberies, 661,000 aggravated assaults, and 1.7 million simple assaults each year. Binge drinking has been associated with a higher probability of divorce, spousal abuse, and poor job performance. Binge drinking can cause adverse effects on the body including effects on blood homeostasis and its circadian variation, cardiac rhythm, ischaemic heart disease, blood pressure, white blood cell activity, female reproductive hormone levels as well as adverse effects on the fetus. There is also evidence from animal studies that binge drinking causes brain damage. Binge drinking has been associated with lower abdominal pain in women. Ketoacidosis can occur in individuals who chronically abuse alcohol and have a recent history of binge drinking. Alcohol affects brain development quite significantly especially during adolescence when the brain is still developing. The main lobes that are involved in decision making and complex thought processes are undergoing their final development phase during adolescence and binge drinking can negatively stunt the growth of these frontal lobes.

=== Adolescence and young adulthood ===
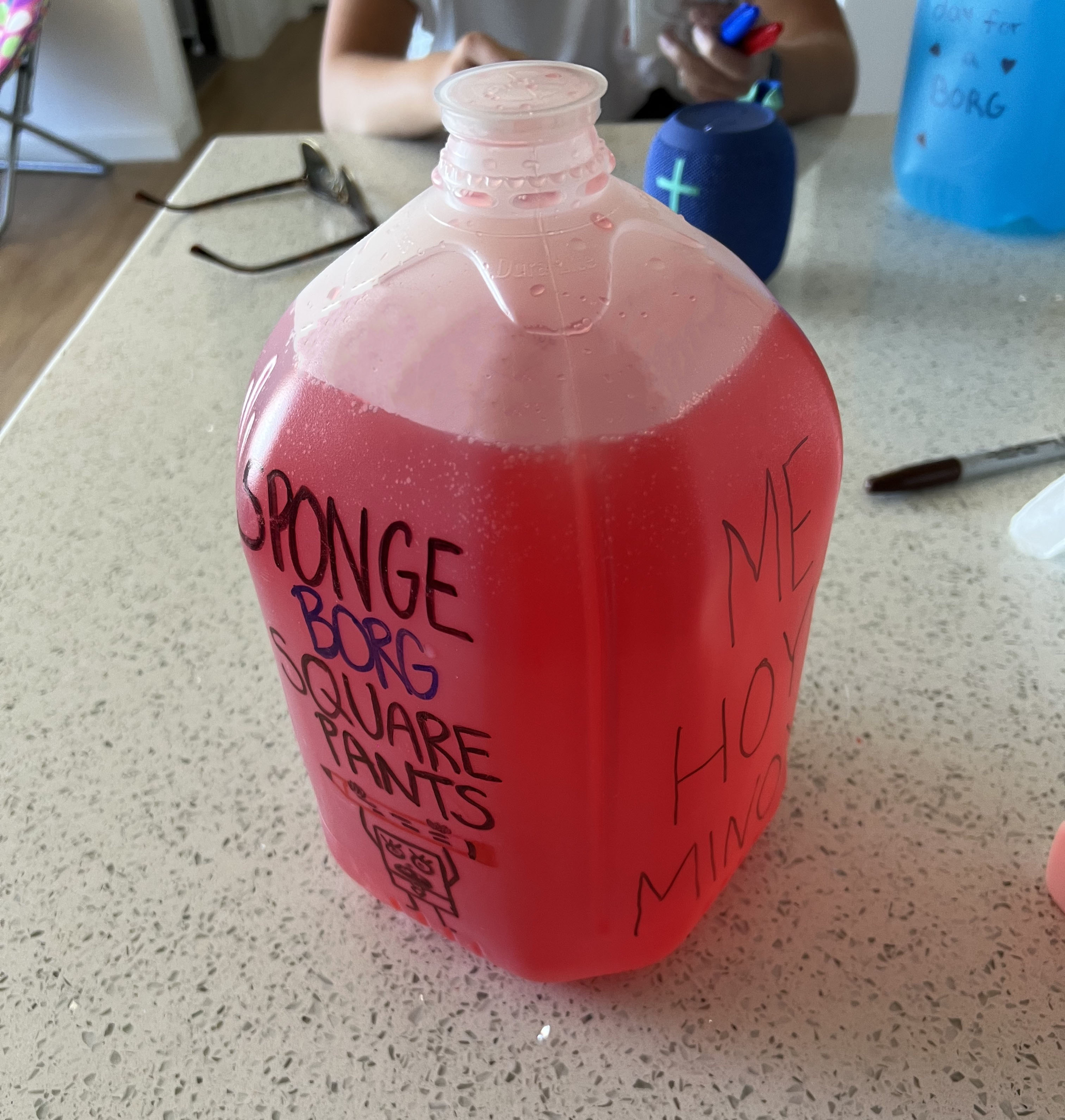
Experts and governments have warned and discouraged a few alcoholic beverages including caffeinated alcoholic drinks, alcopop, and borg (pictured), that often makes young people binge drink.

The high levels of binge drinking among young people and the adverse consequences that include increased risk of alcoholism as an adult and liver disease make binge drinking a major public health issue. Recent research has found that young college binge drinkers who drink four or more drinks on more than three occasions in the past two weeks are statistically 19 times more likely to develop alcoholism than non-binge drinkers, though the direction of causality remains unclear. This is particularly interesting, as drinking for the sole purpose of getting drunk remains a major health and social problem on college campuses across the United States. Heavy and regular binge drinking during adolescence is associated with an increased risk of alcoholism. Approximately 40% of alcoholics report heavy drinking during adolescence. Repeated episodes of excessive drinking, especially at an early age, are thought to cause a profound increase in the risk of developing an alcohol-related disorder (ICD-10, harmful use/dependence syndrome). Heavy drinking is also closely associated with depression. Those with severe depression have higher rates of alcohol abuse than those with low depression. College students who are depressed are more susceptible to use alcohol than college students who are not depressed. In a study conducted at Harvard University, it was found that about 32% of students surveyed were diagnosable for alcohol abuse and about 6% were diagnosed as alcohol dependent. Binge drinking is also becoming an increasing problem in Australian adolescents, the Australian School Students Alcohol and Drug survey conducted by the National Cancer Council discovered that around 33% of students between years 7 and 11 consumed alcohol in the week leading up to the survey, they also found that 10% of the students participated in binge drinking at a consumption level which is considered dangerous to adults. When the survey results were separated into age groups, the findings were that 13% of 15-year-olds and 22% of 17-year-olds had alcohol consumption levels above the daily maximum suggested to adults, and that 20% of 17-year-olds had a consumption level of alcohol considered risky to adults.

Other risk factors that influence the development of alcohol abuse or alcoholism include social and genetic factors. Several researchers have found that starting to drink before the age of 15 is associated with a fourfold increased risk for developing alcoholism compared to people who delay drinking until age 20 or later. It has been estimated by some that if the age at which people started drinking could be delayed to age 20, there would be a 50% reduction in the number of cases of alcohol use disorder. However, it is unclear whether this is a causal relationship, or a function of confounding familial (and other) factors associated with both age at first drink and propensity for alcoholism.

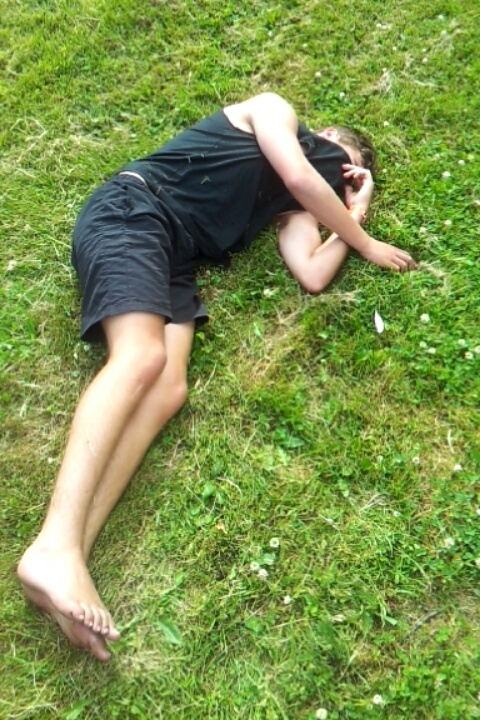
A young man lying comatose after a binge drinking session

The main cause of death among adolescents as a result of binge drinking is road traffic accidents; a third of all fatal road traffic accidents among 15- to 20-year-olds are associated with drinking alcohol. Cyclists and pedestrians are likely to have less spatial awareness and concentration while travelling after binge drinking and, also, it is more common that adolescents who binge-drink drive drunk or are the passenger of a drunk driver. It has been found that 50% of all head injuries in adolescents in the US are associated with alcohol consumption. Violence and suicide combine to become the third-most-common cause of death associated with binge drinking among adolescents. The suicide risk in adolescents is more than four times higher among binge drinkers than non-binge drinking adolescents.

Earlier sexual activity, increased changing of sexual partners, higher rate of unwanted pregnancy, higher rate of sexually transmitted diseases, infertility, and alcohol-related damage to the fetus during pregnancy are associated with binge drinking. Female binge drinkers are three times more likely to be sexually assaulted; 50% of adolescent girls reporting sexual assault were under the influence of alcohol or another psychotropic substance at the time.

Adolescents who regularly participated in binge drinking for several years show a smaller hippocampus brain region, in particular those who began drinking in early adolescence. Heavy binge drinking is associated with neurocognitive deficits of frontal lobe processing and impaired working memory as well as delayed auditory and verbal memory deficits. Animal studies suggest that the neurodegenerative effects of alcohol abuse during adolescence can be permanent. Research in humans, which used sophisticated brain scanning technology suggests that in adolescent teenagers, drinking more than four or five drinks once or twice a month results in subtle damage to the teenagers developing brain tissue, in particular the white matter. However, this research is primarily cross-sectional and done with fairly small sample sizes, making causality less certain.

Several studies have been conducted to discover if there is a link between binge drinking in adolescent years and becoming a chronic alcohol consumer when they transition into adulthood. A particular study conducted by the National Longitudinal Survey of Youth found that harmful drinking during adolescent years was significantly associated with the continuation of dangerous levels of alcohol consumption into adulthood. Binge drinking is a way for young adolescents to rely on alcohol as a way to cope with certain stress or depression.

In college, many students will join Greek organizations that revolve heavily around social drinking. For new members, especially in fraternities, binge drinking is heavily encouraged, and underage drinking is commonplace. Over the past few decades, many schools have cracked down on Greek events with strict policies and active monitoring. However, the festivities did not stop, and many members were not only affected during their time in college but also later in life. Studies have shown that both male and female students who were associated with Greek organizations were more likely to develop Alcohol Use Disorder (AUD) in comparison to their non-Greek counterparts.

A 2023 systematic review highlights the non-addictive use of alcohol for managing developmental issues, personality traits, and psychiatric symptoms, emphasizing the need for informed, harm-controlled approaches to alcohol consumption within a personalized health policy framework.

=== Cardiovascular system ===
A recent study conducted on an American College tested to discover if excessive binge drinking would affect the cardiovascular system. From the results they received, they found alterations in the binge drinkers' macrocirculation and microcirculation functions, which may be a sign of a risk in cardiovascular disease. The study suggests that binge drinkers with a history of strong binge drinking should be screened regularly.

=== Central nervous system ===
Heavy binge drinkers tend to have delayed auditory and verbal memory and deficits in executive planning function and episodic memory, which are similar to deficits seen in Korsakoff's syndrome. Impairments in spatial working memory and pattern recognition tasks have also been found in heavy binge drinkers. Impulse control is also impaired in binge drinkers, especially female binge drinkers. Additionally, immediate and delayed recall of verbal and visual information is impaired; conversely, semantic organizational ability is better in binge drinkers compared to non-binge drinkers. Studies in adolescents have shown that regular binge drinking may cause long-lasting cognitive impairments, though the threshold needed to produce significant effects remains unclear. Cognitive impairment in adults is also unclear, as one study found no association between binge drinking and cognitive impairment. Binge drinking is believed to increase impulsivity due to altered functioning of prefrontal–subcortical and orbitofrontal circuits. Binge drinking and alcoholics who have undergone multiple detoxifications are associated with an inability to interpret facial expressions properly; this is believed to be due to kindling of the amygdala with resultant distortion of neurotransmission. Adolescents, females, and young adults are most sensitive to the neuropsychological effects of binge drinking. Adolescence, in particular early adolescence, is a developmental stage that is particularly vulnerable to the neurotoxic and neurocognitive adverse effects of binge drinking due to it being a time of significant brain development.

Binge drinking regimes are associated with causing an imbalance between inhibitory and excitatory amino acids and changes in monoamines release in the central nervous system, which increases neurotoxicity and may result in cognitive impairments, psychological problems and in long-term heavy binge drinkers may cause irreversible brain damage in both adolescents and adults.

While several rat studies indicate that alcohol is more toxic during adolescence than adulthood, some researchers believe that it remains unclear whether this is also the case in humans. Though heavy binge drinking adolescent humans show impaired brain activity during memory tests and underdeveloped brain structures compared to adolescents who did not binge-drink, they argue that these findings are similar to adult alcoholics who did not abuse alcohol during adolescence. Extrapolation from animal studies to humans is notoriously difficult, and a review by the group Choose Responsibility concluded that alcohol's long-term damage to cognitive processes was the same regardless of whether heavy drinking commenced during adolescence or later.

=== Pregnancy ===
Binge drinking is a more important factor than average alcohol intake, concerning the severity of alcohol induced damage to the fetus. Alcohol has definite long-term adverse effects on the fetus, in particular impaired attentional skills, and may lead to psychiatric disorders when the child grows up. In a 2005 study in the US, approximately one in five non-pregnant women binge-drank and one in 25 pregnant women binge-drank. Binge drinking during pregnancy is associated with fetal alcohol syndrome, alcohol-related birth defects as well as alcohol-related neurodevelopmental disorders. The affected children after birth may have an intellectual impairment and problems with learning, memory, attention, problem solving and problems with mental health and social interactions. Deformities in facial features, skeletal and body organs, as well as a smaller head circumference, are also sometimes present in these children. Studies in sheep indicate that fetal neurotoxicity induced by alcohol may be due to acidaemia and hypercapnia. Binge drinking three or more times during pregnancy has been associated with an increased risk of stillbirth.

=== Sudden death ===
Binge drinking is also associated with strokes and sudden death. Binge drinking increases the risk of stroke by 10 times. In countries where binge drinking is commonplace, rates of sudden death on the weekend in young adults and middle aged people increase significantly. The withdrawal phase after an episode of binge drinking is particularly associated with ischaemic stroke as well as subarachnoid haemorrhage and intracerebral haemorrhage in younger men. In individuals with an underlying cardiac disorder, a binge on alcohol increases the risk of silent myocardial ischaemia as well as angina. Binge drinking has negative effects on metabolism, lipid profile, blood coagulation and fibrinolysis, blood pressure and vascular tone and is associated with embolic stroke and acute myocardial infarction. Due to these risks, experts believe that it is extremely important to warn people of the risks of binge drinking. Binge-drinking by people otherwise considered to be light drinkers is associated with an increased risk of cardiovascular problems and mortality. Binge drinking increases cardiovascular toxicity due to its adverse effects on the electrical conduction system of the heart and the process of atherothrombosis. Excessive alcohol consumption is responsible for an average of 80,000 deaths in the U.S. each year^{1} and $223.5 billion in economic costs in 2006.^{2} More than half of these deaths and three-quarters of the economic costs are due to binge drinking^{1 and 2} (≥4 drinks for women; ≥5 drinks for men, per occasion).

=== Urinary system ===
The bladder may rupture if overfilled and not emptied. This can occur in the case of binge drinkers having consumed very large quantities, but are not aware, due to stupor, of the need to urinate. This condition is very rare in women, but it does occur. Symptoms include localized pain and uraemia (poisoning due to reabsorbed waste). The recovery rate is high, with most fatalities due to septic blood poisoning. A person is more likely to urinate while passed out before the bladder ruptures, as alcohol relaxes the muscles that normally control their bladder.

=== Acute hazards ===
The most common risk of consuming massive quantities of alcohol in a short period is a dangerously high blood alcohol level. The result is called alcohol poisoning (overdose), which can be fatal. Choking on (or inhalation of) vomit is also a potential cause of death, as are injuries from falls, fights, motor vehicle and bicycle accidents. Nine percent of college students who binge drink drive after binge drinking. Another common risk is a blackout (alcohol-related amnesia), which can cause shame, guilt, embarrassment, harm to personal relationships, injury or death, and is also associated with the loss of personal belongings.

== Pathophysiology ==
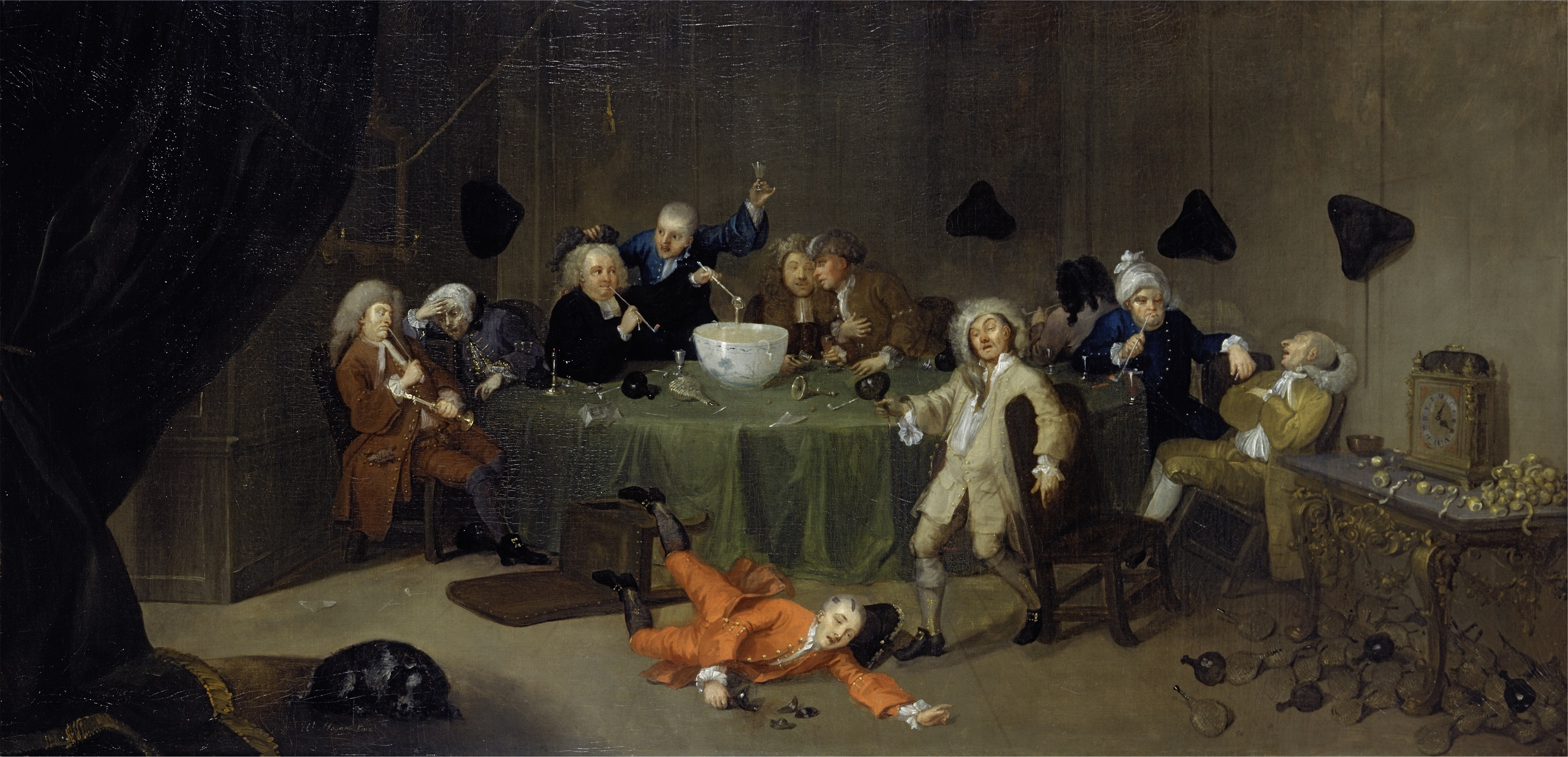
William Hogarth, 1731

Binge drinking has the propensity to result in brain damage faster as well as more severely than chronic drinking (alcoholism), due to the neurotoxic effects of the repeated rebound withdrawal effects. During the repeated alcohol free stages associated with binge drinking, a larger amount of glutamate is released than occurs during withdrawal from chronic alcohol abuse; additionally, this extreme release of glutamate happens on a repeated basis in binge drinkers, leading to excitotoxicity. The tolerance that occurs during chronic ('non-stop') drinking delays alcohol-related brain damage compared to binge drinking, which induces immediate and repeated insults to the brain.

Impairments in impulse control in binge drinkers, which are more prominent in female binge drinkers, are due to dysfunction of the frontal lobe. The findings in humans have been largely concordant with animal studies. Such animal studies find that heavy and regular binge drinking causes neurodegeneration in corticolimbic brain regions areas that are involved in learning and spatial memory, such as the olfactory bulb, piriform cortex, perirhinal cortex, entorhinal cortex, and the hippocampal dentate gyrus. A study in rats found that a heavy two-day drinking binge caused extensive neurodegeneration in the entorhinal cortex with resultant learning deficits. While brain damage from binge drinking is known to occur as a result of binge drinking patterns, it is unclear how long drinking sessions last and how regular binge drinking is done to cause brain damage in humans. One study found that humans who drank at least 100 drinks (male) or 80 drinks (female) per month (concentrated to 21 occasions or less per month) throughout a three-year period had impaired decision-making skills compared to non-binge drinkers. Repeated acute withdrawal from alcohol, which occurs in heavy binge drinkers, has been shown in several studies to be associated with cognitive deficits as a result of neural kindling; neural kindling due to repeated withdrawals is believed to be the mechanism of cognitive damage in both binge drinkers and alcoholics. Neuronal kindling also leads to each subsequent acute withdrawal episode being more severe than previous withdrawal episodes.

Blackouts, a form of amnesia that occurs in binge drinkers may be due to suppressed hippocampus function with rebound NMDA (glutamate) activity combined with excessive glucocorticoid release induced by the stress of repeated intoxication followed by acute withdrawal/abstinence is the proposed mechanism of neural kindling leading to neurotoxicity of structures involved in learning and memory within the brain of binge drinkers. Frontal lobe processing may become impaired as a result of binge drinking, with resultant neurocognitive deficits and impaired working memory.

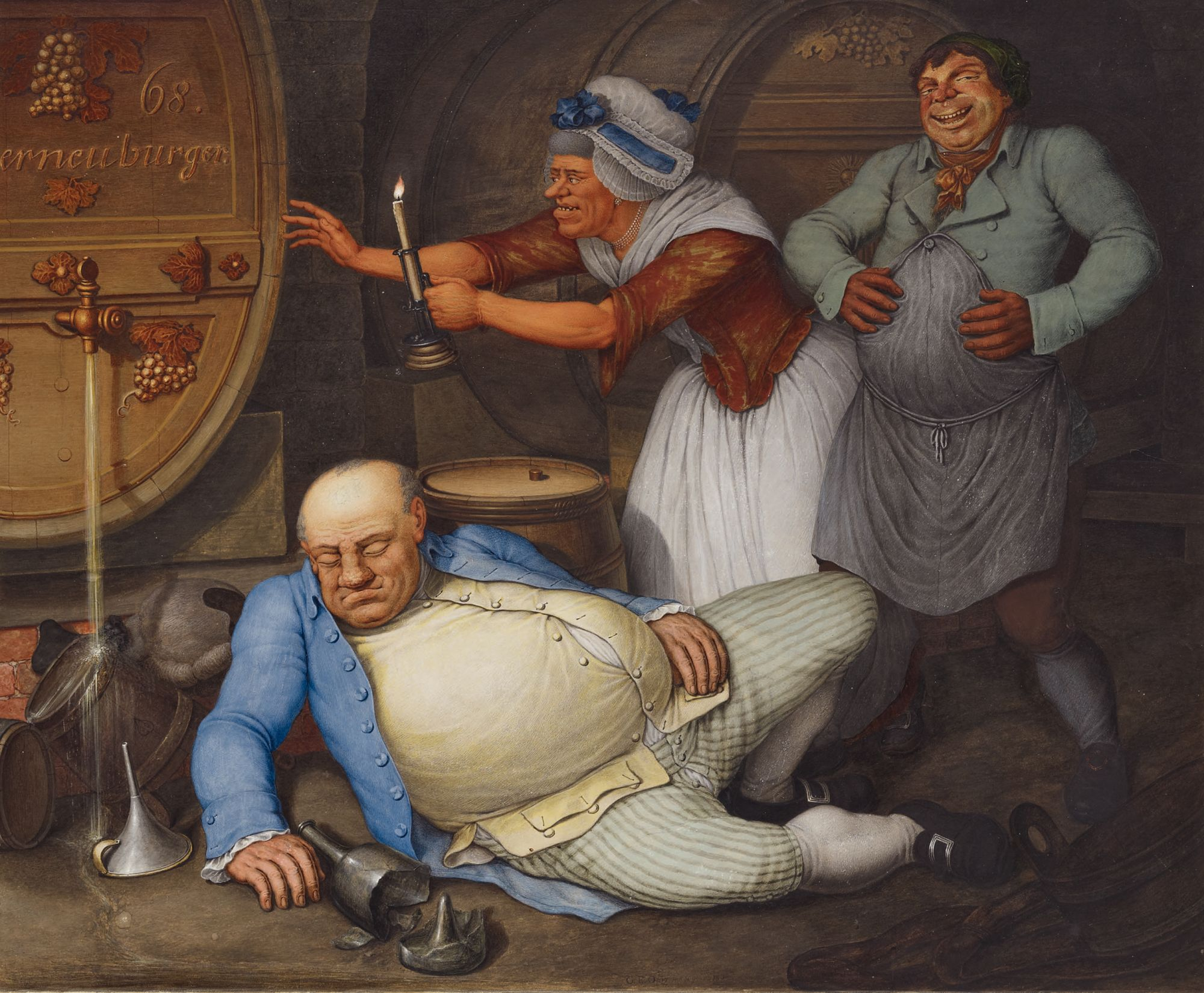
A drunken man, 1804

Alcohol suppresses brain function during intoxication; but upon withdrawal rebound effects occur in the glutamate/NMDA system and with excess glutamate activity glucocorticoid release; due to the repeated intoxication, followed by acute withdrawal, a neurotoxic effect that damages the central nervous system develops, leading to persisting impairments in verbal and nonverbal cognitive abilities as well as impairment of spatial orientation. Due to developmental processes occurring during adolescence, including myelination and restructuring of the synapses, adolescents are thought to be more vulnerable to the neurotoxic effects of alcohol.

Age and genetic factors influence the risk of developing alcohol-related neurotoxicity. Adolescence, especially early adolescence (i.e. before age 15), is a critical and delicate developmental stage when specialised neuronal and synaptic systems mature. This critical developmental stage is where lifelong adult traits, e.g., talents, reasoning and complex skills mature; however, alcohol and in particular binge drinking may disrupt and interfere with this developmental process. Adolescence is also a period of development characterised by a high level of novel seeking, thrill seeking and risk-taking behaviour, and thus alcohol and other drug experimentation and abuse are common. An adolescent rat study found that a short exposure to high levels of alcohol resulted in long-lasting changes to functional brain activity with corresponding abnormalities in EEG brain waves that persisted into adulthood, including persisting disturbances in sleep EEG with a reduction in slow wave sleep. These EEG findings are similar to premature aging. According to one review of the literature, if the developmental stage of adolescence is similar to the developmental stage of the fetus with regard to sensitivity to the neurotoxic effects of alcohol, and if long-lasting or permanent damage to the brain occurs similar to what animal studies suggest, then this represents a major public health issue due to the high levels of alcohol use by adolescents. Indeed, alcohol can affect the remodeling and functional changes in synaptic plasticity and neuronal connectivity in different brain regions that occurs during adolescence (see this related article).

== Diagnosis ==
An alcohol use disorder may develop when a person continues to drink heavily despite recurrent social, interpersonal, and/or legal problems. Behaviorally, frequent binge drinking is usually involved, but not everyone who engages in binge drinking develops an alcohol use disorder.

For the purpose of identifying an alcohol use disorder when assessing binge drinking, using a time frame of the past 6 months eliminates false negatives. For example, it has been found that using a narrow two-week window for assessment of binge drinking habits leads to 30% of heavy regular binge drinkers wrongly being classed as not having an alcohol use disorder. However, the same researchers also note that recall bias is somewhat enhanced when longer timeframes are used.

== Prevention ==
Binge drinking is considered harmful, regardless of a person's age, and there have been calls for healthcare professionals to give increased attention to their patients' drinking habits, especially binge drinking. Some researchers believe that raising the legal drinking age and screening brief interventions by healthcare providers are the most effective means of reducing morbidity and mortality rates associated with binge drinking. Programs in the United States have thought of numerous ways to help prevent binge drinking. The Centers for Disease Control and Prevention suggests increasing the cost of alcohol or the excise taxes, restricting the number of stores who may obtain a license to sell liquor (reducing "outlet density"), and implementing stricter law enforcement of underage drinking laws. There are also a number of individual counseling approaches, such as motivational interviewing and cognitive behavioral approaches, that have been shown to reduce drinking among heavy drinking college students. In 2006, the Wisconsin Initiative to Promote Healthy Lifestyles implemented a program that helps primary care physicians identify and address binge drinking problems in patients. In August 2008, a group of college presidents calling itself the Amethyst Initiative asserted that lowering the legal drinking age to 18 (presumably) was one way to curb the "culture of dangerous binge drinking" among college students. This idea is controversial. Proponents argue that the 21 law forces drinking underground and makes it more dangerous than it has to be, while opponents have claimed that lowering the age would only make the situation worse. Despite health warnings, most Australian women drink at least one night a week. But experts are warning they are not only damaging their bodies but are also at risk of attracting sexual predators.

=== Reduction ===
Research shows ways to reduce binge drinking or engage in dangerous drinking. Some computer-based intervention appear to reduce binge drinking, an example of which is "rethinking drinking". A systematic review of published research also indicated that face-to-face interventions are most effective in reducing binge drinking among college students, although internet-based interventions may also be beneficial.

Understanding consumer personality and how people view others is important. People were shown ads talking of the harmful effects of binge drinking. People who valued close friends as a sense of who they are were less likely to want to binge drink after seeing an ad featuring them and a close friend. People who were loners or who did not see close friends as important to their sense of who they were reacted better to ads featuring an individual. A similar pattern was shown for ads showing a person driving at dangerous speeds. This suggests ads showing potential harm to citizens from binge drinking or dangerous driving are less effective than ads highlighting a person's close friends.

In 2009, the Australian Government Department of Health and Ageing spent $53.5 million Australian Dollars on the National Binge Drinking Strategy to target young Australians. This campaign, titled "Don't Turn a Night Out into a Nightmare," was delivered to the public over many mass media platforms to show the harms and consequences of risky single occasion drinking (RSOD), as binge drinking is defined in Australia. Evidence as to the effectiveness of these types of campaigns is mixed. Research needs to be completed to ensure that the effectiveness of the messages results in a positive shift in the behaviours of the target audience.

== Treatment ==
Due to the risks, especially in adolescents, of cognitive impairments and possible irreversible brain damage associated with binge drinking, urgent action has been recommended. There is some evidence that interventions by employers, such as health and lifestyle checks, psychosocial skills training and peer referral, can reduce the level of binge drinking. In the US brief motivational interventions have shown some benefit in reducing future binge drinking.

Adolescents who misuse alcohol can benefit from interventions aimed at risk reduction. For more severe cases, an intervention involving parents, guardians, or a psychotherapist is recommended. An effective strategy of intervention for adolescents whose binge drinking leads to admission to hospital, e.g. for alcohol poisoning or injury, is manualised brief interventions at the hospital in one to four counseling sessions each lasting 30 to 60 minutes conducted by trained staff. Evaluation of personal pattern of drinking and associated risks and an emphasis on personal responsibility in a non-condescending manner is recommended during the intervention; discussing and informing, and educating the adolescent of possible negative short-term and long-term consequences of drinking is recommended. The setting of goals and rules to achieve those goals is also recommended during intervention with problem binge drinking adolescents. Motivational enhancement therapy also shows promise as a treatment.

Increasing public information and awareness regarding the risks of binge drinking, conducting interviews in emergency departments of young people suspected of harmful drinking patterns, and trying to persuade them to accept individual counseling in youth addiction counseling services are effective strategies for reducing the harm of binge drinking. Encouraging recreational and adventurous training activities such as climbing or driving can be used alternative "natural buzzes" to alcohol misuse. Additionally, the provision of educational content about the risks of binge drinking and a risk assessment is beneficial during intervention with young binge drinkers and a referral in the case of an alcohol use disorder for specialised help.

According to the NIAAA definition of "heavy drinkers", men may be at risk for alcohol-related problems if their alcohol consumption exceeds 14 standard drinks per week or four drinks per day, and women may be at risk if they have more than seven standard drinks per week or three drinks per day. Despite this risk, a 2014 report in the National Survey on Drug Use and Health found that only 10% of either "heavy drinkers" or "binge drinkers" also met the criteria for alcohol dependence, while only 1.3% of non-binge drinkers met these criteria. An inference drawn in this study is that evidence-based policy strategies and clinical preventive services may effectively reduce binge drinking without requiring addiction treatment in most cases.

== Epidemiology ==
Binge drinking is more common in men than it is in women. Among students in the US, approximately 50% of men and 39% of women binge drink. Racial differences exist among binge drinking with Hispanics followed by Caucasians having the highest level of binge drinking. Caucasians are nearly twice as likely to binge drink as blacks. It is a common pattern among Native Americans.

Statistics published in 2013 indicated that among the Australian youth population, 31% of males and 14% of women aged 15 to 17 years engage in risky alcohol consumption.

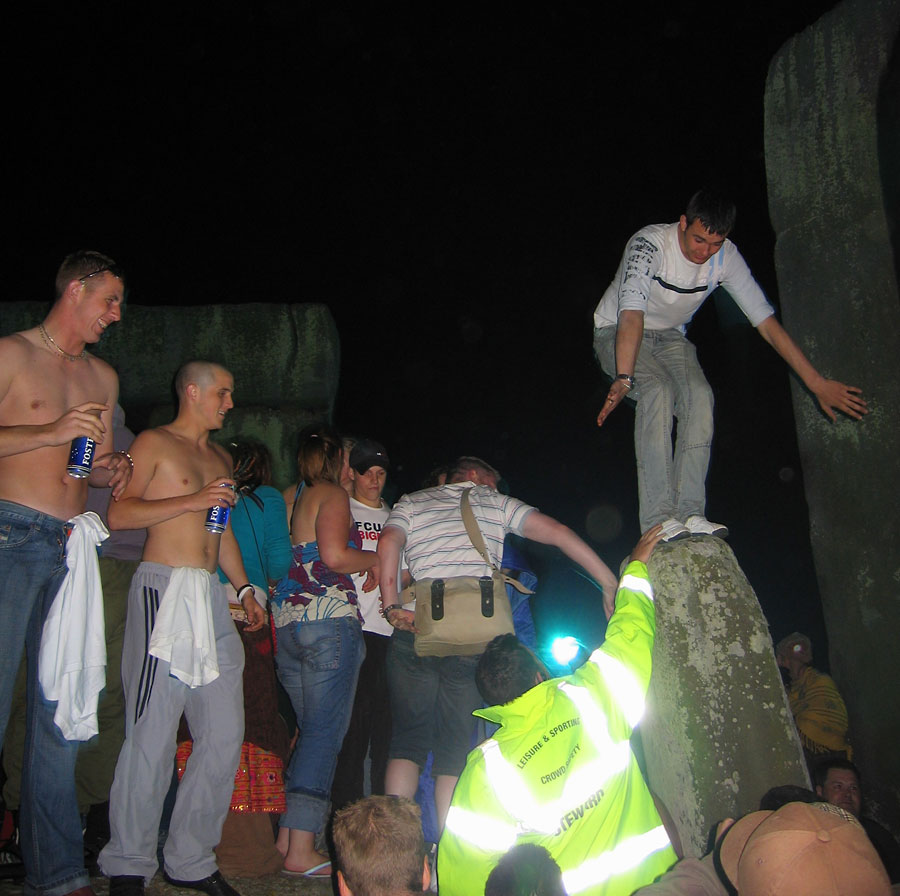
Binge drinking can prompt police action for public intoxication and disturbing the peace.

Individuals of African descent have a lower level of binge drinking followed by those of Asian descent. In the case of Asians, their low level of binge drinking may be due to the presence of the aldehyde dehydrogenase gene (ALDH2, Chromosome 12) in many (but by no means the vast majority) that results in poor metabolism of alcohol, which leads to severe adverse effects such as facial flushing. Men are more likely to binge drink (up to 81% of alcohol binges are done by men) than women and men are also more likely to develop alcohol dependence than women. People who are homozygous for the ALDH2 gene are less likely to binge-drink due to severe adverse effects that occur even with moderate amounts of alcohol consumption.

College students are more likely to binge drink than their same-age peers who were not enrolled in college. In the US, this effect has caused serious problems with the country's legal drinking age. This effect is more prevalent in women than in men.

Other factors that have been found to correlate with higher levels of binge drinking include low religiosity, marijuana use, living with roommates, and cigarette use.

== Society and culture ==
Binge drinking costs the UK economy approximately £20 billion a year; 17 million working days are estimated to be lost due to hangovers and drink-related illness each year. The cost of binge drinking to employers is estimated to be £6.4 billion and the cost per year of alcohol harm is estimated to cost the National Health Service £2.7 billion. Urgent action has been recommended to understand the binge drinking culture and its aetiology and pathogenesis and urgent action has been called for to educate people with regard to the dangers of binge drinking.

The Centers for Disease Control and Prevention (CDC) released a study in October 2011 that showed that in the United States, binge drinking costs society $223 billion a year, which amounts to $2 per drink. These costs include health care costs for alcohol-related issues, including liver cirrhosis, loss of work productivity, property damage due to drunk driving, and expenditures related to criminal acts. Overall, 11.9% of binge drinkers drove during or within two hours of their most recent binge drinking episode. Those drinking in licensed establishments (bars, clubs, and restaurants) accounted for 54.3% of these driving episodes. Significant independent risk factors for driving after binge drinking included male gender (AOR=1.75); being aged 35–54 or ≥55 years compared to 18–34 years (AOR=1.58 and 2.37, respectively); and drinking in bars or clubs compared to drinking in the respondent's home (AOR=7.81). Drivers who drank most of their alcohol in licensed establishments consumed an average of 8.1 drinks, and 25.7% of them consumed ≥10 drinks.

Research indicates that cultural norms and social expectations surrounding alcohol consumption can normalize binge drinking behaviors, making heavy episodic drinking appear socially acceptable. These societal attitudes can reduce the perceived urgency for individuals to recognize potential harms or seek help, particularly among young adults and in environments where drinking is a central social activity. Peer pressure, media portrayals of drinking as glamorous, and traditions that celebrate alcohol use all contribute to this normalization. Studies suggest that such cultural factors not only increase the prevalence of binge drinking but also delay interventions and public health responses aimed at reducing alcohol-related harms.

== Sex differences ==
Women become intoxicated more quickly than men, and experience a higher blood alcohol level. This difference in effect occurs even when a woman's body weight and consumption of alcohol are the same as those of a man. Because of these discrepancies, college-age women tend to experience the consequences of binge drinking before their male counterparts.

There is no known safe level of alcohol consumption, either when trying to get pregnant or during pregnancy. With alcohol abuse remaining highly stigmatized—particularly in the case of pregnant women—some advocate for treatment programs to focus on a non-judgmental stance, on personal empowerment, and on offering contraceptives to women engaging in sex, to prevent fetal alcohol spectrum disorder.

However, men are almost twice as likely to partake in excessive drinking than women, there being a higher rate of alcohol-related hospitalizations among males than females. Researchers from Columbia and Yale found the discrepancy could be due to the fact men release more dopamine during alcohol consumption than women. The increased neurochemical release causes a stronger association with pleasure and alcohol intoxication. "This may contribute to the initial reinforcing properties of alcohol and the risk for habit formation".

== History ==
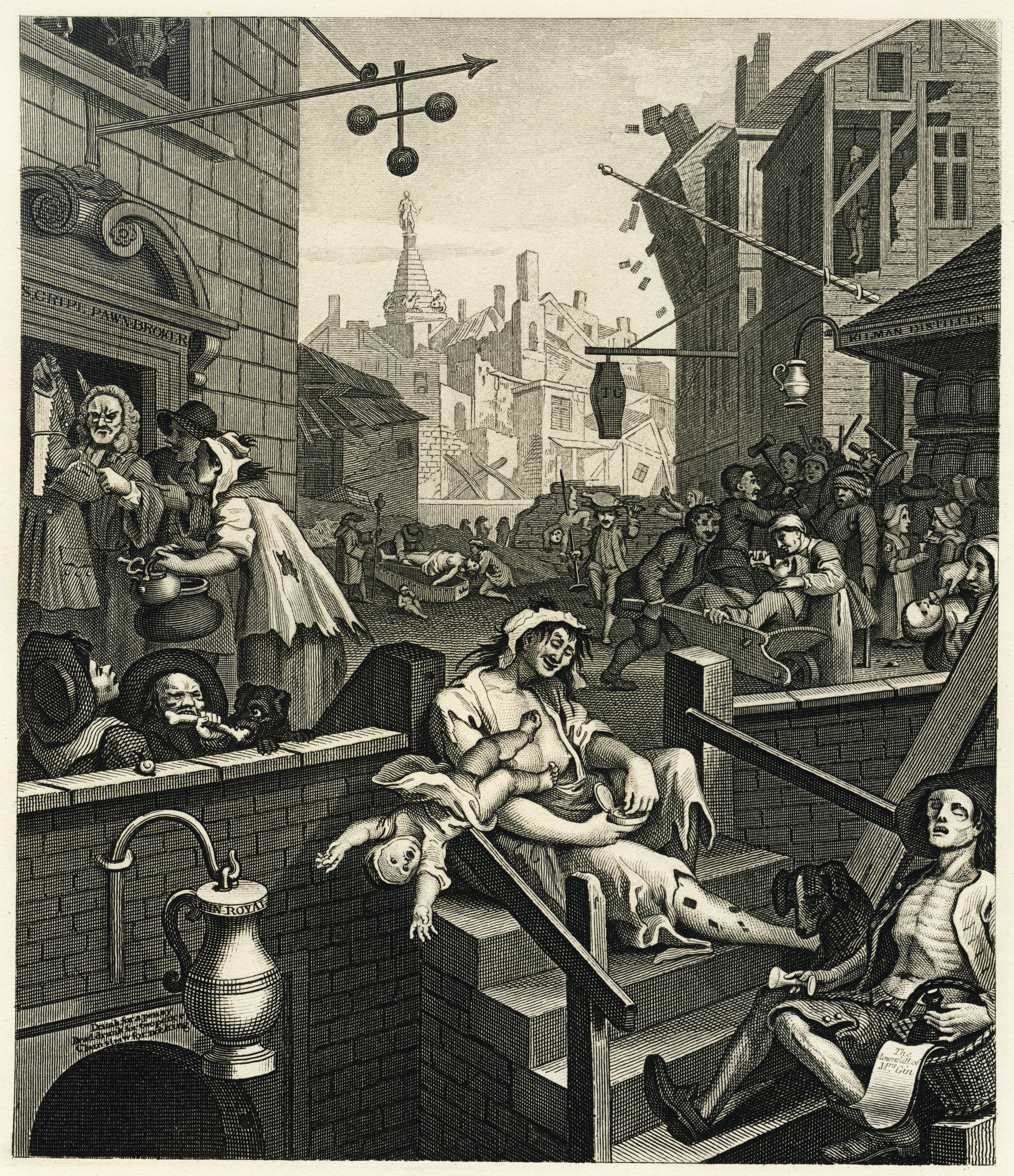
Gin Lane by William Hogarth, 1751

The popular story dates the etymology of the term Dutch courage to English soldiers fighting in the Anglo-Dutch Wars (1652–1674) and perhaps as early as the Thirty Years' War (1618–1648). One version states that jenever (or Dutch gin) was used by English soldiers for its calming effects before battle, and for its purported warming properties on the body in cold weather. Another version has it that English soldiers noted the bravery-inducing effects of jenever on Dutch soldiers.

The Gin Craze was a period in the first half of the 18th century when the consumption of gin increased rapidly in Great Britain, especially in London. By 1743, England was drinking 2.2 gallons (10 litres) of gin per person per year. The Sale of Spirits Act 1750 (commonly known as the Gin Act 1751) was an Act of the Parliament of Great Britain (24 Geo. 2. c. 40) which was enacted to reduce the consumption of gin and other distilled spirits, a popular pastime that was regarded as one of the primary causes of crime in London.

== See also ==
- 0-0-1-3 - U.S. Air Force program for binge drinking prevention
- Alcarelle
- Balconing
- Holiday heart syndrome
- Zapoy
