= Zapoy =

Russian term for serious alcohol abuse

Zapoy or zapoi (Russian: запой, [zɐˈpoj]) is a term used in Russia and other post-Soviet states to describe alcohol abuse behavior resulting in two or more days of continuous drunkenness. In 2007, about 20% of Russian men demonstrated behaviours associated with hazardous drinking, and about 30% of working-age male deaths could be attributed (directly or indirectly) to alcohol abuse.

French author Emmanuel Carrère, in his biography of the Russian poet and political dissident Eduard Limonov, writes:

Zapoi is serious business, not a one-night bender of the kind we partake in, the kind you pay for with a hangover the next day. Zapoi means going several days without sobering up, roaming from one place to another, getting on trains without knowing where they're headed, telling your most intimate secrets to people you meet by chance, forgetting everything you've said and done: a sort of voyage.

== See also ==
- Alcohol consumption in Russia
- Binge drinking
- Dipsomania
- Holiday heart syndrome
