= George A. O'Toole Jr. =

American federal judge (born 1947)

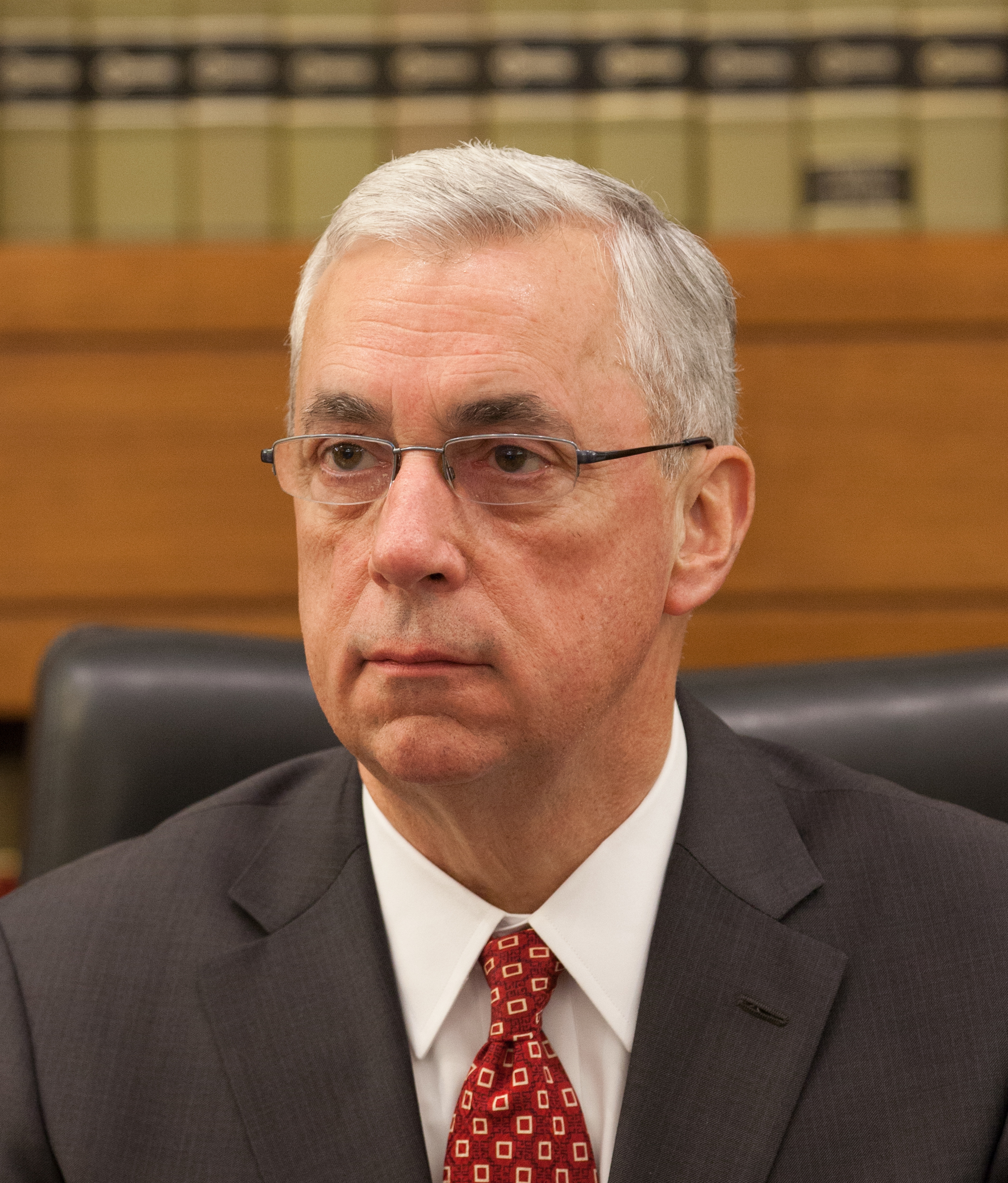
- O'Toole in 2016

Senior Judge of the United States District Court for the District of Massachusetts
- Incumbent
- Assumed office January 1, 2018

Judge of the United States District Court for the District of Massachusetts
- In office May 26, 1995 – January 1, 2018
- Appointed by: Bill Clinton
- Preceded by: new seat authorized by 104 Stat. 5089
- Succeeded by: Myong J. Joun

Personal details
- Born: October 7, 1947 (age 79) Worcester, Massachusetts, U.S.
- Education: Boston College (BA); Harvard University (JD)

George Augustine O'Toole Jr. (born October 7, 1947) is an American lawyer and jurist serving as a senior United States district judge of the United States District Court for the District of Massachusetts.

== Education and career ==
Born in Worcester, Massachusetts, O'Toole received a Bachelor of Arts from Boston College in 1969 and a Juris Doctor from Harvard Law School in 1972. He was in private practice in Boston, Massachusetts from 1972 to 1982. He was an associate justice of the Boston Municipal Court from 1982 to 1990, and of the Superior Court of Massachusetts from 1990 to 1995.

== Federal judicial service ==
On April 4, 1995, O'Toole was nominated by President Bill Clinton to a new seat on the United States District Court for the District of Massachusetts created by 104 Stat. 5089 following the appointment of Rya W. Zobel as director of the Federal Judicial Center. He was confirmed by the United States Senate on May 25, 1995, and received his commission on May 26, 1995. He assumed senior status on January 1, 2018.

=== Notable decision ===
O'Toole presided over the 2015 trial of Dzhokhar Tsarnaev, one of the perpetrators of the Boston Marathon bombing.

On February 6, 2025, O'Toole temporarily blocked the U.S. federal deferred resignation program. On February 12, 2025, he allowed the reauthorization of the program.

== Personal life ==
He is married to Lucy A. Flynn, a local banker, businesswoman, and community activist. They have two sons, George and John.

== Sources ==
Legal offices
Preceded by new seat authorized by 104 Stat. 5089	Judge of the United States District Court for the District of Massachusetts; 1995–2018	Succeeded by Myong J. Joun
