= Macon Bolling Allen =

American lawyer (1816–1894)

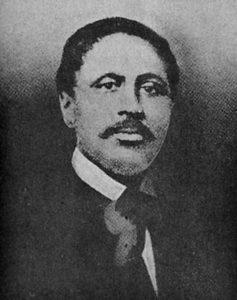
- Born: Allen Macon Bolling; August 4, 1816; Indiana, U.S.
- Died: October 15, 1894 (aged 78); Washington, D.C., U.S.
- Resting place: Charleston, South Carolina, U.S.
- Other name: Allen Macon Bolling
- Occupations: Lawyer, judge
- Known for: First African-American lawyer and Second African-American Justice of the Peace
- Spouses: Emma Allen; Hannah Allen
- Children: 7

Macon Bolling Allen (born Allen Macon Bolling; August 4, 1816 – October 15, 1894) was an American attorney who is believed to be the first African American to become a lawyer and to argue before a jury, and the second to hold a judicial position in the United States. Allen passed the bar exam in Maine in 1844 and became a Massachusetts Justice of the Peace in 1847. He moved to South Carolina after the American Civil War to practice law and was elected as a judge in 1873 and again in 1876. Following the Reconstruction Era, he moved to Washington, D.C., where he continued practicing law.

== Career ==
=== Becoming a lawyer ===
Born in Indiana as A. Macon Bolling, he moved to New England at some point in the early 1840s and changed his name to Macon Bolling Allen in Boston in January 1844. Soon after, Allen moved to Portland, Maine and studied law, working as an apprentice to Samuel Fessenden, a local abolitionist and attorney. The Portland District Court rejected Fessenden's first motion to admit Allen to the bar in April 1844, concluding Allen did not meet the state's citizenship requirement (being a resident of Massachusetts at the time). Allen tried again, pursuing admission by examination, a method that did not require citizenship. He faced a hostile examination committee, which Fessenden thought did not want Allen admitted. Nevertheless, Fessenden said, "his qualifications were not denied." Allen was granted his license to practice law in Maine on July 3, 1844, becoming the nation's first African American lawyer. He experienced difficulty finding legal work in Maine, likely because white people were unwilling to hire a black attorney and few black people lived in Maine.

Allen moved back to Boston, Massachusetts, and was admitted to the bar there in May 1845. He conducted a jury trial in October 1845 that is believed to be the first time an African American lawyer argued before a jury in the United States. The case was a contract dispute. Allen's client, the defendant, lost, although the jury awarded lower damages than the plaintiff had requested.

Allen encountered difficulties in Boston. Racial prejudice made it difficult for him to earn a living; in 1845, he wrote a letter to John Jay Jr. (the grandson of the country's first Chief Justice) discussing the difficulty of finding clients in Boston and wondering whether he would do better in New York City, with its larger African American population. Four years later, Allen was attacked by four men in Boston, although their motivation is unclear. In 1852, Allen's landlord pressed charges against him for allegedly ripping out parts of his apartment to burn as firewood. A jury acquitted him.

=== Judgeships in Massachusetts and South Carolina ===
After passing a rigorous qualifying exam for Justice of the Peace for Middlesex County, Massachusetts in 1847, Allen became the second African American in the United States to hold a judicial position, following only Wentworth Cheswill (who in 1805 was elected as the Justice of the Peace for Rockingham County, New Hampshire), despite not being considered a full U.S. citizen under the Constitution at the time (although see the remarks about state citizenship in the above section as well as the holdings about Maine in Dred Scott). As Justice of the Peace, Allen would have handled minor crimes and small claims.

Allen moved to Charleston, South Carolina, following the Civil War and opened a law office with two other African American attorneys, William Whipper and Robert Elliott. Their firm, Whipper, Elliott, and Allen, is the first known African American law firm in the country. Among other cases, Allen represented several black defendants who were fighting death sentences. The state legislature in 1873 elected Allen (choosing him instead of Whipper) to be a judge of Charleston County Criminal Court. He served for three years. In 1876, he was elected as probate judge for Charleston County, South Carolina, defeating the white incumbent.

=== Later career ===
Allen moved to Washington, D.C., at the end of Reconstruction. He continued to practice law and was employed as an attorney in 1873 for a firm called the Land and Improvement Association.

== Personal life ==
Allen and his wife, Emma Levy, had six children while living in the Boston area. Two died in childhood. The family spent some of their Massachusetts years in Dedham, where a deed shows property owned by “Emma L. Allen … wife of Macon B. Allen.”

After moving to South Carolina, Allen and Emma had another child. Emma died in 1870, along with another of the couple's children. Allen married his second wife, Hannah Weston, at some point before 1880.

Allen possibly suffered from dementia in his later years, and died in Washington in 1894, age 78.

== Chronology ==
1816 Born in Indiana

1844 Changes his name in Boston to Macon Bolling Allen

1844 Admitted to the bar in Maine on July 3

1845 Admitted to the bar in Massachusetts on May 3 and fell into a low life point looking for work.

1846 Advertises Boston law practice in several editions of The Liberator

1847 Becomes a Justice of the Peace for Middlesex County

1868 Moves to Charleston, South Carolina, where he joins the first known African American law firm

1873 Elected judge of Charleston County Criminal Court

1876 Elected probate judge in Charleston County

1894 Dies in Washington, D.C., on October 10

== See also ==
- Jane Bolin, both the first black woman to graduate from Yale Law School and serve as a judge in the United States.
- Thurgood Marshall, the first black Associate Justice of the U.S. Supreme Court.
- Robert Morris, a prominent early African American lawyer in Boston.
- Charlotte E. Ray, the first black woman lawyer in the United States.
- George Lewis Ruffin, both the first black man to earn a degree from Harvard Law School and become Massachusetts first African American judge.
- List of African-American jurists
- List of first minority male lawyers and judges in Massachusetts
