= Dipsomania =

Medical condition

Dipsomania is a historical term describing a medical condition involving an uncontrollable craving for alcohol or other drugs. In the 19th century, the term dipsomania was used to refer to a variety of alcohol-related problems, most of which are known today as alcohol use disorder. Dipsomania is occasionally still used to describe a particular condition of periodic, compulsive bouts of alcohol intake. The idea of dipsomania is important for its historical role in promoting a disease theory of chronic drunkenness. The word comes from Greek dipso- (from Greek: δίψα 'thirst') and mania (Greek: μανία 'madness, frenzy, compulsion etc.').

It is mentioned in the World Health Organization ICD-10 classification as an alternative description for Alcohol Dependence Syndrome, episodic use F10.26.

== History ==
The term was coined by the German physician Christoph Wilhelm Hufeland in 1819, when, in a preface to an influential book by German-Russian doctor C. von Brühl-Cramer, he translated Brühl-Cramer's term "trunksucht" as "dipsomania". Brühl-Cramer classified dipsomania in terms of continuous, remittent, intermittent, periodic and mixed forms, and in his book he discussed its cause, pathogenesis, sequelae, and treatment options, all influenced by prevailing ideas about the laws of chemistry and concepts of excitability.

Due to the influence of Brühl-Cramer's pioneering work, dipsomania became popular in medical circles throughout the 19th century. Political scientist Mariana Valverde describes dipsomania as "the most medical" of the many terms used to describe habitual drunkenness in the 19th century. Along with terms such as "inebriety", the idea of dipsomania was used as part of an effort of medical professionals and reformers to change attitudes about habitual drunkenness from being a criminally punishable vice to being a medically treatable disease. As historian Roy MacLeod wrote about this dipsomania reform movement, it "illuminates certain features of the gradual transformation taking place in national attitudes towards the prevention and cure of social illnesses during the last quarter of the 19th century."

Although dipsomania was used in a variety of somewhat contradictory ways by different individuals, by the late 19th century the term was usually used to describe a periodic or acute condition, in contrast to chronic drunkenness. In his 1893 book Clinical Lessons on Mental Diseases: The Mental State of Dipsomania, Magnan characterized dipsomania as a crisis lasting from one day to two weeks, and consisting of a rapid and huge ingestion of alcohol or whatever other strong, excitatory liquid was available. Magnan further described dipsomania as solitary alcohol abuse, with loss of all other interests, and these crises recurred at indeterminate intervals, separated by periods when the subject was generally sober.

Similarly, in 1892 the influential English physician and mental health expert Daniel Hack Tuke defined dipsomania as a syndrome involving "an irresistible obsession and impulse to drink, coming on in attacks, during which the patients are in a condition of impotence of will and manifest great anguish." Tuke clarifies that dipsomania can be distinguished from what was at the time considered alcoholism by six key factors. First, "an alcoholic patient becomes insane because he drinks; a dipsomaniac is insane before he commences to drink." Second, "alcoholism is an intoxication which has as its cause alcohol; dipsomania has its cause in a defective mental condition, and alcohol is but a secondary factor, which may be replaced by any other poison, leaving to the syndrome all its psychological characters." Third, "dipsomania proceeds in paroxysmal attacks, and the appetite for strong drink is absent during the intervals between the attacks. Alcoholism has no definite course." Fourth, "a dipsomaniac satisfies a pathological and imperious want; he does not like alcohol, and takes it against his will," whereas "an alcoholic individual has no actual want; he only obeys a vice, a proclivity, and an alteration of his moral sense." Fifth, a dipsomaniac is conscious and ashamed of his condition, whereas an alcoholic is sometimes unaware of, but more often indifferent to it. Finally, he concluded that "dipsomania is a syndrome, always identical with itself, whilst alcoholism is an intoxication varying much in its clinical symptoms."

Over time, the term dipsomania became less common, replaced by newer ideas and terms concerning chronic and acute drunkenness and alcohol use disorder.

=== Examples in fiction ===
- Sebastian Flyte, a character from the novel Brideshead Revisited by Evelyn Waugh, who sarcastically describes himself as a dipsomaniac
- James O. Incandenza, a character in Infinite Jest by David Foster Wallace, described in the novel as having "crippling dipsomania"
- Dwight Carson, a talented writer in The Fountainhead, who is turned into a dipsomaniac on the whim of Gail Wynand
- Mrs. Ritchey (played by actress Charlotte Merriam in the 1931 movie Night Nurse) who exclaims that she is a dipsomaniac several times when confronted by Barbara Stanwyck's character (Lora Hart) with the fact that Ritchey's daughter is dying from malnutrition
- Peter Morgan Sr., (played by actor Charles Coburn) in the 1938 movie Vivacious Lady, talks about his nephew Keith Morgan's (played by James Ellison) dipsomania ways
- Richard Gilmore, a character in the TV series Gilmore Girls, refers to a fundraiser speaker as a dipsomaniac in the season one episode "P.S. I Lo..."
- Susanna Conolly (alias Lalage Virtue, a talented singer and player), in George Bernard Shaw's first novel The Irrational Knot.
- Raymond Reddington, a character played by actor James Spader in the TV series The Blacklist, uses the term while referring to a bogus DUI charge being used as blackmail in the season 4 episode "Lipet's Seafood Company (No. 111)".

=== Examples in science ===
- William Thomson, 1st Baron Kelvin writing to George FitzGerald on April 9, 1896: "I have not had a moment's peace or happiness in respect to electromagnetic theory since Nov. 28, 1846 (see vol i. p. 80 M.P.P). "All this time I have been liable to fits of ether dipsomania, kept away at intervals only by rigorous abstention from thought on the subject."

== See also ==
- Holiday heart syndrome
- Potomania
- Zapoy
