= George Lewis Ruffin =

American judge and politician (1834-1886)

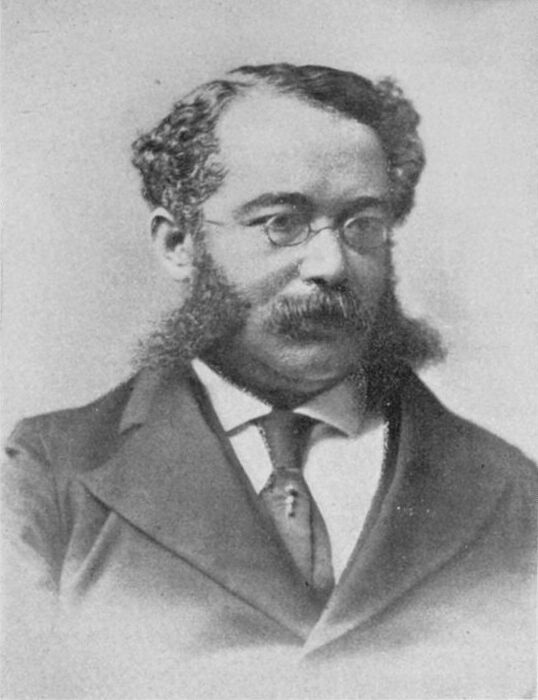
- Ruffin as a municipal judge

Associate Justice of the Boston Municipal Court
- In office 1883–1886
- Appointed by: Benjamin Franklin Butler

Member of the Boston Common Council from Ward 9
- In office January 3, 1876 – January 7, 1878 Serving with Uriel Crocker, Curis Guild Sr. (1876), and Robert Means Thompson (1877)
- Preceded by: Nahum Morrison; Cyrus A. Page; Francis H. Peabody; John Osborne Jr.
- Succeeded by: John J. Smith

Member of the Massachusetts House of Representatives from the 6th Suffolk district
- In office January 5, 1870 – January 2, 1872 Serving with Harvey Jewell and Hugh Flood
- Preceded by: Linus Child; John J. Smith
- Succeeded by: Frederic W. Lincoln Jr. Charles R. Codman; John J. Smith

Personal details
- Born: December 22, 1834 Richmond, Virginia, U.S.
- Died: November 19, 1886 (aged 51) Boston, Massachusetts, U.S.
- Party: Republican
- Spouse: Josephine St. Pierre (m. 1858)
- Children: 5, including Florida
- Education: Harvard Law School (1869)

George Lewis Ruffin (December 16, 1834 – November 19, 1886) was an African-American barber, attorney, politician, and judge. In 1869, he graduated from Harvard Law School, the first African American to do so. He was also the first African American elected to the Boston City Council. Ruffin was elected in 1870 to the Massachusetts Legislature. In 1883, he was appointed by the governor Benjamin Franklin Butler as a judge to the Municipal Court, Charlestown district in Boston, making him the first African American judge in the United States. He married 16 year-old Josephine St. Pierre in 1858. Florida Ruffin Ridley was one of their children.

== Biography ==
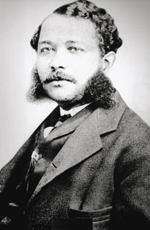
Image of Ruffin

Ruffin was born to George W. (1800–1863) and Nancy Lewis Ruffin (1816–1874) in Richmond, Virginia as a free person of color, of African and European ancestry. The city had a large free Black community. His family moved to Boston in 1853, where he was educated in the public schools.

=== Marriage and family ===
In 1858, he married Josephine St. Pierre, who was of Afro-Caribbean, French and English descent. Together they had four sons and a daughter. Their children were Hubert, who became an attorney; Florida Ridley, a school principal and co-founder with her mother of the newspaper The Woman's Era; Stanley, an inventor; George, a musician; and Robert, who died in his first year of life.

=== Career ===
Ruffin became a barber to support his family and read law books on the side and studied law with the partnership of Harvey Jewell and William Gaston. He started publishing articles in a law journal and was admitted to Harvard Law School after saving enough money to enroll. After graduating in 1869 as the first African American to earn a law degree from Harvard University, he practiced law with success in Boston. He was politically active and attended the National Negro Convention of Syracuse, New York in 1864 and of New Orleans, Louisiana in 1872.

He was elected to the Massachusetts state legislature in 1870 as a Republican and served one term. Ruffin was elected as the first man of African descent to the Boston City Council, where he served two terms, 1875–1876 and 1876–1877.

Ruffin was elected in 1876 to the Boston Common Council, serving two terms in the body.

He supported Benjamin F. Butler in Butler's 1871 campaign for governor, and on November 7, 1883, he was appointed by then Governor Butler as a judge of the Municipal Court, Charlestown district. He was the first African American justice to hold office in New England. That year he was also made consul resident for the Dominican Republic. At the time, the Dominican President was Ulises Heureaux who was also of mostly West African descent.

He died in Boston, Massachusetts and is buried in Mount Auburn Cemetery.

Introduces book by Douglass

In 1881, Ruffin provided the introduction to The Life and Times of Frederick Douglass, written by himself, for its first edition by Park Publishing Co., Hartford. Therein, he situated the book in its historical context, described its author, and quickly sketched the major events of his momentous life. From his personal witness, Ruffin narrated a scene of the courage and resolve shown by Douglass in the face of an angry mob, at Tremont Temple in 1860.

== Legacy and honors ==
In 1984, the George Lewis Ruffin Society was founded in his honor at Northeastern University to support minorities studying in the Massachusetts criminal justice system.

== See also ==
- Macon Bolling Allen is believed to be both the first black man licensed to practice law and to hold a judicial position in the United States.
- Jane Bolin was both the first black woman to graduate from Yale Law School and serve as a judge in the United States.
- Thurgood Marshall was the first black Associate Justice of the U.S. Supreme Court.
- Charlotte E. Ray was the first black woman lawyer in the United States.
- List of African-American jurists
- List of first minority male lawyers and judges in Massachusetts
