= Juan José Segura-Sampedro =

Spanish surgeon and researcher

- Born: 4 September 1985 (age 40); Seville
- Citizenship: Spanish
- Known for: Research into Oncologic surgery and trauma surgery
- Awards: Order of Police Merit (2018) Order of the British Empire (MBE, 2021)
- Scientific career
- Fields: General surgery
- Workplaces: Hospital Universitario La Paz

Juan José Segura-Sampedro MBE (born 4 September 1985) is a Spanish surgeon and researcher at Hospital Universitario La Paz, Madrid, Spain, and professor of surgery at Universidad CEU San Pablo. He is best known for his research in major trauma, focused on the balconing phenomenon and a preventive campaign in collaboration with the British Foreign Office.

== Biography ==
He received his medical degree from Seville University in 2009 and completed his general and digestive surgery training at Virgen del Rocío University Hospital in Seville and at St Marks Hospital in London. He received his PhD Cum laude from the University of Seville in 2016. Segura-Sampedro taught surgery at the CEU Cardinal Herrera University in Castellón.

== Balconing ==
Segura-Sampedro and his team first described the balconing phenomenon in 2017 and published their data in a paper entitled Balconing: An alcohol-induced craze that injures tourists. Characterization of the phenomenon. in the journal Injury. The researchers pointed to alcohol abuse as the main risk factor to suffer this severe trauma. He also pointed out that Irish and British people were the most likely to suffer this kind of trauma, triggering different campaigns against alcohol during holidays and close to balconies in Ireland, United Kingdom and Spain. After the paper was published, a preventive campaign was developed in collaboration with the British Foreign office where Segura-Sampedro talked to British youth about avoiding injuries and not becoming a victim of this phenomenon. After this, Segura-Sampedro participated in similar campaigns on Irish RTÉ television, and on British BBC television where he explained balconing and its consequences on the Victoria Derbyshire programme.

The main discoveries of Segura-Sampedro et al. findings regarding balconing were the subset of population who suffers from it, male tourists from northern Europe, and its relation with alcohol and substance abuse. These findings have conducted Balearic authorities towards new policies to control alcohol consumption as they look for reducing the spate of accidents. The Balearic government is concerned that "all-in" package holidays, might encourage drunkenness and antisocial dangerous behaviour.

As a result of this research and its impact on Calvià, he was awarded the Order of Merit of the Calvià Police Force in 2018, for his outstanding contribution to improving the safety of visitors with his research and campaigns against uncivil tourism in Calvià.

== Oncologic surgery and innovations ==
At Son Espases University Hospital, his research was focused on oncologic surgery (cytoreductive surgery and HIPEC) and trauma surgery.

He has developed and patented an app for surgical patients and a new packing system to control hepatic bleeding after blunt trauma.

As of 2021, he has a h-index of 19 and has published more than 130 research papers in peer-review journals.

== Merits and awards ==
He was awarded with the "Mateu Orfila" research prize of the Balearic Official Medical College in 2019 for his research work on morbidity associated to liver resection and transfusion during cytoreductive surgery and HIPEC. He was awarded with the 2019 research prize of the Balearic Medical Academy for his work about goal-directed therapy in cytoreductive surgery with hyperthermic intraperitoneal chemotherapy. He was awarded with the "Metge Matas" research prize of the Balearic Official Medical College in 2020 for his research work on a new device "for grade IV–V liver injury in porcine model".

He was one of the Spanish scientists invited to the Singularity University Summit in Spain due to his advances in telematic follow-up for surgical patients.

He was founder and current editor of the academic journal Annals of Mediterranean Surgery.

He is a committee member of the European Society of Surgical Oncology and a member of the Spanish Chapter of the World Society for Emergency Surgery.

He serves as an associated editor of Frontiers in Surgery and Frontiers in Oncology and as guest editor of Cancers.

== Honours ==
- In 2018 he was awarded the Order of Police Merit for his contribution to improving visitor safety through his investigations and campaigns in Calviá.
- In 2021 he was awarded the MBE by the British Government for services to British visitors to Spain, due to his research and prevention work to avoid alcohol-related trauma among British tourists.

== Books published ==
- Factibilidad y seguridad del plasma rico en factores de crecimiento (PRGF) en el tratamiento de la fístula anal criptoglandular [Feasibility and safety of plasma rich in growth factors (PRGF) in the treatment of cryptoglandular anal fistula] (in Spanish) (2nd ed.). Createspace Independent Pub. 10 May 2016. ISBN 9781537241920.
- Tratamiento actual del tumor neuroendocrino de recto [Current treatment of neuroendocrine tumor of the rectum] (in Spanish) (2nd ed.). CreateSpace Independent Publishing Platform. 1 November 2011. ISBN 9781530512492.
