= Charles Grabau =

American judge

Charles Grabau is a Middlesex, Massachusetts Superior Court Judge.

He is most noted for ruling over the case of Thomas Junta in 2002, as well as several high-profile priest abuse scandals including Robert Gale and Paul R. Shanley.

== See also ==
- List of Hispanic and Latino American jurists
- List of first minority male lawyers and judges in Massachusetts
