= Balconing =

Jumping into a swimming pool from a balcony

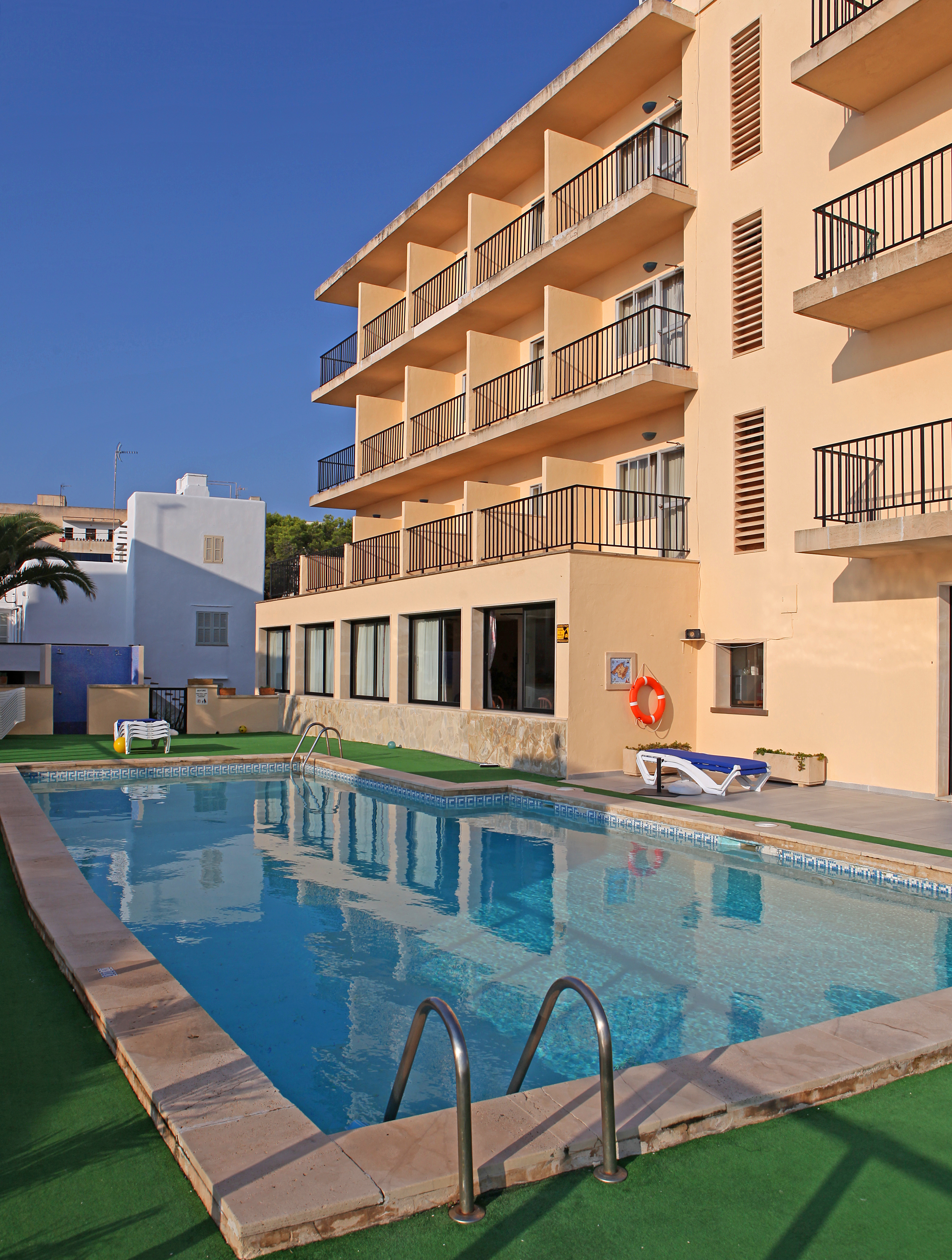
Hotel Rocamar in Mallorca

Balconing is the name given in Spain to the act of jumping into a swimming pool from a balcony or falling from height while climbing from one balcony to another, performed by foreign tourists while on holiday. The term was formed through a combination of the Spanish-language word balcón ('balcony') and the English-language suffix "-ing".

== Practice ==
In 2010 and 2011, a spate of injuries attributed by the Spanish press to "balconing" occurred among tourists in the Balearic Islands (mainly Mallorca and Ibiza). Videos of people jumping into pools from balconies were posted on video sharing websites such as YouTube, which were alleged to have played a role in the spread of the phenomenon.

A similar phenomenon has been described in college-related events in the United States.

== History ==
The first documented case of balconing involved Argentine musician Charly García, who jumped from the ninth floor of the Aconcagua Hotel into the pool on March 3, 2000, in Mendoza.

This was the first ever sport that I actually enjoyed in my life

— Charly García, moments after jumping

In 2018, there were six reported balconing accidents (British, Irish, and one French). Three of them died due to the fall. This was more than during the years 2016 and 2017. Nonetheless, some cases might not be due to the practice of balconing, but might have other causes like accidental fall due to excessive alcohol consumption.

In 2019, the phenomenon had less news coverage in Spain, but the practice continued. By late June, ten new cases had already been reported, all of them from young male tourists - a Belgian, a German, a Swede, an Australian and six British tourists. Of these ten cases, three of the British tourists died on impact. The rest were saved by the Spanish Health Services and recovered. More cases were registered in July and August of the same year.

== Injuries and deaths ==
In 2010 in Spain, there were six deaths and 11 injuries in falls from balconies which were identified in the Spanish press as relating to "balconing". Most of these incidents involved young British and German tourists with measurable blood alcohol content, and the incidents occurred between 10 p.m. and 7 a.m. CEST. In the same year, hotels were reported to have raised the height of railings from 1.05 metres (3.4 ft) to 1.2 metres (3.9 ft) to reduce balconing incidents. In Mallorca, three tourists died in 2017 in falls from balconies identified in the Spanish press as "balconing" incidents. Between 2010 and 2015, up to 46 injuries are claimed to have occurred due to this practice.

== Statistics ==
According to Juan José Segura, doctor at Son Espases's hospital, 85% of the victims fall accidentally, usually while trying to jump from one balcony to the next or while drunk and recklessly moving near the edge, while the rest actively jump off the balcony. He estimates an average of 10 to 15 cases each year since 2011, with an increase since more of these jumps have been posted on YouTube.

Doctor Segura and the British Foreign Office established the profile of the "average practitioner" as a 24 year old British male.

Of the 46 cases registered up to 2019, 45 were carried out by males (97%), and 61% were British. German, Belgian and other nationalities are less numerous. Intoxication and recklessness with alcohol seem to play a pivotal role in the falls. Over 95% of the victims were found to have high levels of alcohol in their blood, and 37% had consumed other drugs. The average medical cost per case of injury due to balconing is €32,000. The balconies have a median height of 8 metres (26 ft), and the people have a median age of 24 years.

== Causes of the falls ==
There is an estimated 15% of cases caused by individuals deliberately jumping off the balconies to the pools. However 85% of the falls seem accidental. Spanish authorities consider that the culture of turismo de borrachera ("binge-drinking tourism"; tourism with the goal of getting drunk and going wild abroad) in certain countries is the main cause of the falls, along with the age of the participants, the choices made and the high levels of intoxication, arguably aided by the difference in alcohol accessibility between North and South Europe.

A British report regarding the death of Tom Hughes in 2018 ruled in 2019 that, regardless of the state of intoxication of Hughes, the main factor that caused his death was the knee-high wall of a walkway in the Eden Roc apartment complex in Magaluf. Hughes was one of three Britons to die from falls at the same apartment complex, two of them involving the same low wall. The ruling caused outrage in various sectors of the Spanish tourist industry and health sector, and prompted a response from Spain's College of Architects indicating that all the buildings followed the European Safety Regulations for balcony walls, which establish the exact same height for balcony walls as the UK regulations.

== Preventive measures ==
In 2018, the Foreign Office teamed up with Juan José Segura to run a campaign of video messages to British tourists heading to the Balearic Islands during the summer. RTÉ also made a special program where a doctor from Mallorca participated.

Despite these campaigns, "balconing" is still a problem and various hotels in the Balearic Islands have been forced to implement measures against it, like closing their balconies or building taller walls around them. Magaluf has been forced to regulate drinking in an attempt to control reckless behaviour, including but not limited to balconing. It has also introduced heavy fines for the practice of balconing, of between €750 and €1,500.
