= Supplementary process =

Supplementary process is a method of debt collection where the debtor who has a court money judgement against him is brought into court, "requiring the judgment debtor to appear at a time and place named therein and submit to an examination relative to his or its property and ability to pay." The process is common in Massachusetts under M.G.L. Ch. 224, s. 14. If the debtor does not appear in court, a Capias ad respondendum may issue where a sheriff brings the debtor into court to respond.
