= Myong J. Joun =

American judge (born 1971)

Myong Joun
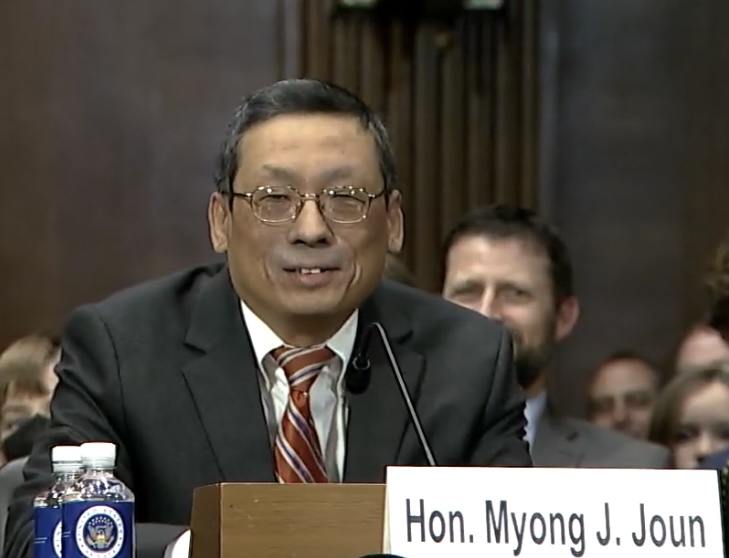

Judge of the United States District Court for the District of Massachusetts
- Incumbent
- Assumed office July 14, 2023
- Appointed by: Joe Biden
- Preceded by: George A. O'Toole Jr.

Associate Justice of the Boston Municipal Court
- In office 2014 – July 14, 2023
- Nominated by: Deval Patrick

Personal details
- Born: Myong Jin Joun (전명진); 1971 (age 54–55) Seoul, South Korea
- Education: University of Massachusetts Boston (BA); Suffolk University (JD)

Military service
- Allegiance: United States
- Branch/service: United States Army; Massachusetts National Guard
- Years of service: 1990–1996
- Unit: 1-101st Infantry Regiment, 26th Infantry Division; 1-182nd Infantry Regiment, 42nd Infantry Division

Myong Jin Joun (born 1971) is an American lawyer serving as a United States district judge of the United States District Court for the District of Massachusetts. He previously served as an associate judge of the Boston Municipal Court.

== Education ==
Joun earned a Bachelor of Arts degree from the University of Massachusetts Boston in 1994 and a Juris Doctor from the Suffolk University Law School in 1999.

== Career ==
From 1999 to 2007, Joun worked as an associate at Howard Friedman P.C. in Brookline He was a solo practitioner from 2007 to 2014. In 2014, Governor Deval Patrick nominated Joun to serve as an associate judge of the Boston Municipal Court. Joun also served in the United States Army and Massachusetts National Guard, serving in the 1-101st Battalion (26th Infantry Division) and the 1-182nd Battalion (42nd Infantry Division). Joun has worked with the ACLU of Massachusetts, the National Lawyers Guild, the Massachusetts Law Reform Institute, the American Bar Foundation and the Massachusetts Bar Foundation.

=== Federal judicial service ===
On July 29, 2022, President Joe Biden announced his intention to nominate Joun to serve as a United States district judge of the United States District Court for the District of Massachusetts. On August 1, 2022, his nomination was sent to the Senate. He has been nominated to a seat vacated by Judge George A. O'Toole Jr., who assumed senior status on January 1, 2018. On November 15, 2022, a hearing on his nomination was held before the Senate Judiciary Committee. On December 8, 2022, his nomination was reported out of committee by a 12–10 vote. On January 3, 2023, his nomination was returned to the President under Rule XXXI, Paragraph 6 of the United States Senate. He was renominated on January 23, 2023. On February 9, 2023, his nomination was reported out of committee by a 12–9 vote. On July 12, 2023, the Senate invoked cloture on his nomination by a 51–46 vote. Later that day, his nomination was confirmed by a 52–46 vote. He received his judicial commission on July 14, 2023. He became the first Asian American man on the federal bench in Massachusetts.

==== Notable rulings ====
In March 2025, Joun issued a temporary restraining order on the freezing of teacher training grants that were deemed by the Trump administration to include funding for diversity, equity, and inclusion, but on April 4, 2025, the Supreme Court reinstated the freeze in a 5–4 decision.

== See also ==
- List of Asian American jurists

Legal offices
Preceded by George A. O'Toole Jr.	Judge of the United States District Court for the District of Massachusetts; 2023–present	Incumbent
