= Dermot Meagher =

American judge

Judge of the Boston Municipal Court
- In office 1989–2006
- Appointed by: Michael Dukakis

Personal details
- Born: Dermot James Meagher; October 19, 1940 Worcester, Massachusetts, U.S.
- Died: December 28, 2023 (aged 83)
- Education: Harvard University (AB); Boston College (LLB)
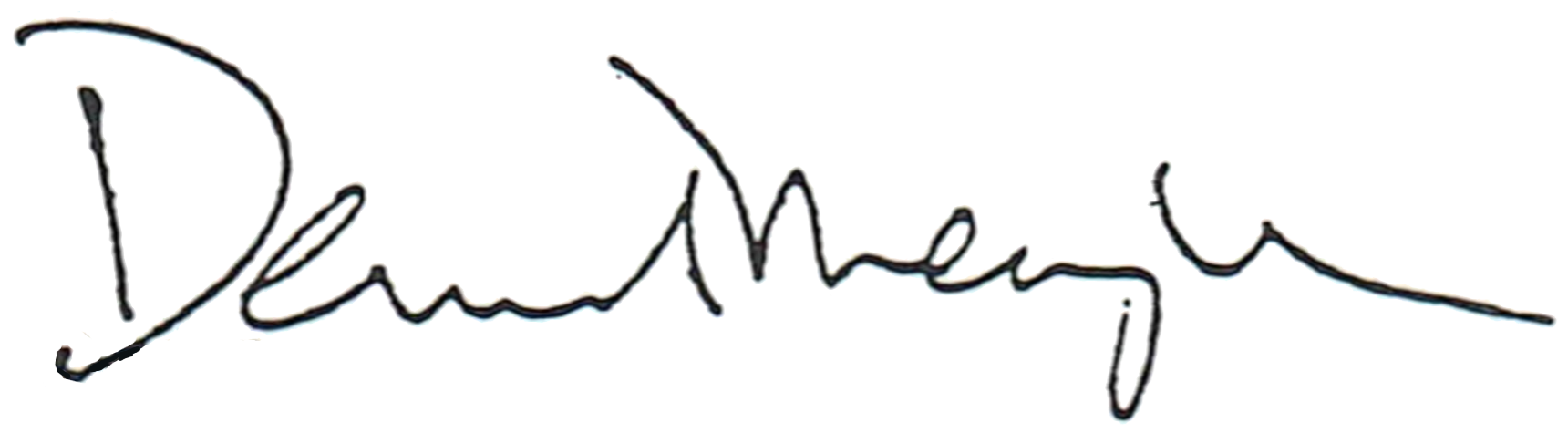
- Signature

Dermot James Meagher (October 19, 1940 – December 28, 2023) was an American lawyer and former judge of the Boston Municipal Court. Meagher was the first openly gay judge appointed in Massachusetts.

== Early life and education ==
Meagher received an A.B. from Harvard University and an LL.B. from Boston College Law School. He received a fellowship in Criminal Justice at Harvard Law school for 1969-1970 and a master's degree in Public Administration from the Kennedy School at Harvard in 1980.

== Legal career ==
He began his legal career as an Assistant District Attorney in Worcester County, Massachusetts. He was in private practice various times. He ran the Percentage Deposit Bail Project in the early 1970s, which reformed the bail system, effectively eliminating bail bondsmen in Massachusetts. He was First Assistant Bar Counsel at the Massachusetts Board of Bar Overseers and a volunteer member of the Boston Human Rights Commission. In 1969-70 he was a Fellow at the Harvard Law School Center for Criminal Justice which was funded by the Ford Foundation where he became concerned with bail and other forms of pretrial release.

== Other activities ==
He was a former member of the board of directors of the Gay and Lesbian Advocates and Defenders (GLAD). He was a founder and member of the Massachusetts Lesbian and Gay Bar Association (MLGBA) and was a member the AIDS Action Committee Legal Services Committee. He was also one of the founders of Lawyers Concerned for Lawyers (LCL) of Massachusetts.

== Judicial service ==
Meagher first applied to be considered for a judicial appointment in Massachusetts in 1985. In 1989, Governor Michael Dukakis selected Meagher to serve on the Boston Municipal Court. Meagher was sworn in on May 3, 1989. He retired in 2006.

== Personal ==
Meagher was a recovering alcoholic who achieved sobriety in 1975; he came out of the closet shortly thereafter. Meagher died on December 28, 2023.

== Works ==
- Brenner, Joseph H.; Coles, Robert; Meagher, Dermot (1970). Drugs & Youth: Medical, Psychiatric, and Legal Facts. ISBN 978-0-87140-501-2.
- Meagher, Dermot (2010). Judge Sentences. ISBN 1-55553-715-4.
- Meagher, Dermot (2012). Lyons and Tigers and Bears. ISBN 0-615-55911-5.
- Meagher, Dermot (2013). Lyons at the Gate: Further Adventures of Judge Joe Lyons. ISBN 1-4819-5390-7.
- Meagher, Dermot (2014). A Moth to the Flame. ISBN 1-5027-0807-8.
- Meagher, Dermot (2015). Provincetown Drawings. ISBN 1-5086-3338-X.
- Meagher, Dermot (2016). Naked. ISBN 1-5232-0170-3.

== See also ==
- List of LGBT jurists in the United States
