= Holiday heart syndrome =

Alcohol-associated arrhythmia condition

- Electrocardiographic image depicting atrial fibrillation (top, red arrow) and normal heart rhythm (bottom)
- Specialty: Cardiology
- Symptoms: Arrhythmia
- Complications: Mitochondrial dysfunction, valvular heart disease, oxidative damage, cell death, dilated cardiomyopathy, electrical vulnerability of the atrium, thrombosis, pneumonia, Cirrhosis, heart failure, and potentially death
- Usual onset: Usually following heavy amounts of Alcohol consumption
- Duration: Usually 24 hours
- Causes: High amounts of ethanol consumption
- Risk factors: Drinking large quantities of alcohol, dehydration, high levels of stress
- Diagnostic method: Blood tests and Medical imaging
- Differential diagnosis: Alcohol use disorder, Dilated cardiomyopathy, Cirrhosis, Arrhythmia, Psychiatric disorders
- Treatment: Cardioversion
- Prognosis: If left untreated can have severe complications, and is possibly fatal
- Frequency: Unclear

Holiday heart syndrome, also known as alcohol-induced atrial arrhythmias, is a syndrome defined by an irregular heartbeat and palpitations associated with high levels of ethanol consumption. Holiday heart syndrome was discovered in 1978 when Philip Ettinger discovered the connection between arrhythmia and alcohol consumption. It received its common name as it is associated with the binge drinking common during the holidays. It is unclear how common this syndrome is. 5-10% of cases of atrial fibrillation may be related to this condition, but it could be as high as 63%.

== Etiology ==
Cardiologists are unsure exactly what causes holiday heart syndrome. The ingestion of alcohol may slow down the cardiac conduction system, which is an important system for managing the circulatory system. It may also shorten the refractory period of the atrium. Another possibility is that alcohol consumption increases the level of catecholamines, which increased the level of P-waves, and therefore the risk of arrhythmia. Alcohol intake can also lead to a rise in plasma free fatty acids and an increase in the activity of the sympathetic nervous system. An ATP2A2 enhancer known as JNK2 may play a role. Alcohol may activate it, which can affect other proteins therefore increasing the risk of arrhythmia. Heavy consumption of alcohol may lead to an increased level of ethanol and metabolites such as acetaldehyde inside of the body. All of these factors can contribute to arrhythmia.

Drinking large quantities of alcohol or caffeine, eating fatty foods with salt, heightened levels of stress, and dehydration are all risk factors for the development of this syndrome. HHS can appear in people who do not usually drink. Often these people who rarely drink may engage in an episode of heavy alcohol consumption and develop it as soon as they drink, others contract it 12–36 hours following the time of intoxication. Usually patients with this disorder lack any family history or previous clinical evidence of cardiological problems. Studies suggest moderate drinking (5-7 drinks per week) may not increase the risk of atrial fibrillation compared to abstinence; however, consumption beyond this range is associated with a substantial increase in the risk of HHS, further supporting the greater risk that binge drinking poses to the development of this condition.

== Symptoms and complications ==
The most common symptoms people with HHS have are heart palpitations and arrhythmia. People usually present with atrial fibrillation; however, other forms of arrhythmia may be developed, such as atrial tachycardia, premature ventricular contraction, and atrial flutter. Patients with HHS also frequently report precordial pain, sweating, anxiety, shortness of breath, and syncope. Strokes and cardiac arrest can also occur in people with this syndrome. People with holiday heart syndrome have a heightened risk of dilated cardiomyopathy, rhabdomyolysis, and acute kidney injury and increased atrial vulnerability to external electrical stimulus under the influence.

The heightened level of acetaldehyde this syndrome causes can result in mitochondrial dysfunction, valvular disease, oxidative damage, cell death, lowered effects of cardioprotective molecules, and an altered calcium transport and protein synthesis system. If left untreated, it can result in thrombosis, pneumonia, cirrhosis, and heart failure. For most patients with HHS the syndrome only lasts 24 hours. However for 26% of people with this syndrome, they reexperience an episode of it within the next year. To treat patients with this condition cardioversion or other treatments for arrhythmia are used.

== Diagnosis ==
Evaluation of suspected holiday heart syndrome involves a history of recent alcohol consumption and the timing of symptoms. A temporal relationship between heavy drinking and the onset of an arrhythmia can suggest alcohol as a trigger. An electrocardiogram (ECG) records the heart's electrical activity and identifies the arrhythmia, which is most commonly atrial fibrillation. To confirm the diagnosis, a clinician reviews the ECG tracing.

== Treatment ==
Treatment varies depending on the person’s clinical condition and specific heart rhythm. Monitoring heart rhythm, correcting electrolyte imbalances, and treating alcohol intoxication or withdrawal are all measures that may be used when needed. In clinically stable patients with atrial fibrillation, treatment may involve controlling the heart rate or restoring a normal heart rhythm. When atrial fibrillation causes hemodynamic instability, such as severe hypotension or shock, immediate synchronized electrical cardioversion is recommended.

== See also ==
- Alcoholic cardiomyopathy
