= Same-sex marriage in Massachusetts =

Same-sex marriage has been legally recognized in Massachusetts since May 17, 2004, as a result of the Massachusetts Supreme Judicial Court (SJC) ruling in Goodridge v. Department of Public Health that it was unconstitutional under the Constitution of Massachusetts to allow only opposite-sex couples to marry. Massachusetts was the sixth jurisdiction in the world to legalize same-sex marriage after the Netherlands, Belgium, Ontario, British Columbia, and Quebec. It was the first U.S. state to open marriage to same-sex couples.

== Legal history ==
=== Background ===
In 1989, passing legislation first proposed in 1973, Massachusetts prohibited discrimination based on sexual orientation in credit, public and private employment, union practices, housing, and public accommodation. In the decade that followed, political debate addressed same-sex relationships through two proxy issues: spousal benefits and parenting rights. The Boston City Council debated health insurance for the same-sex partners of city employees in May 1991, and Cambridge began providing health benefits to the same-sex partners of its employees the following year. In 1992, Governor Bill Weld issued an executive order providing limited benefits to the same-sex partners of approximately 3,000 management-level state employees, covering only leave for family sickness and bereavement, far short of the health benefits LGBT activists were seeking, but probably the first state-level recognition of same-sex relationships. The Roman Catholic bishops of Massachusetts, replying in The Pilot, the newspaper of the Boston Archdiocese, said that Weld's "domestic partners" decision harms the common good "by making a special interest group equal to the family" and confuses "civil rights and family benefits". They asked: "Why should special recognition and assistance be given to friends who happen to share the same house?" Legislation to establish domestic partnerships that would carry spousal benefits was introduced annually in the Massachusetts General Court without success. Its supporters focused on equal benefits and fairness rather than same-sex relationships themselves. In 1998, when the General Court passed a home rule petition allowing Boston to create such a status, Governor Paul Cellucci vetoed it because it applied to different-sex couples, which he thought undermined marriage, while he offered to sign legislation that applied to same-sex couples only. Mayor Thomas Menino's attempt to extend health care benefits to Boston city employees' domestic partners by executive order was successfully challenged by the Catholic Action League in court.

The state had no explicit regulations with respect to foster care and parenting by gays and lesbians, either singly or in relationships, until, on May 24, 1985, the state Department of Social Services, with the approval of Governor Michael Dukakis, created a rule that foster children be placed in "traditional family settings". In December 1986, a commission that reviewed the foster care system recommended that sexual orientation could not be used to disqualify foster parents. As Dukakis delayed accepting that recommendation, advocates for gay and lesbian rights threatened protests against his presidential campaign. The ban on gay foster parents was enacted into law in the 1989 budget. After a lawsuit challenging the ban was settled out of court, the Dukakis administration withdrew the policy in April 1990. In the 1990s, court decisions further expanded the parenting rights of gays and lesbians. In September 1993, the state's highest court ruled that state law allowed for second-parent adoption by a parent of the same sex as a biological parent. In July 1999, the same court awarded visitation rights to each of two mothers after their separation.

Same-sex marriage itself was rarely mentioned or addressed directly during these years. The Coalition for Lesbian and Gay Civil Rights launched a campaign on behalf of marriage rights for same-sex couples in Massachusetts in 1991. Governor Bill Weld said he would be willing to meet with the group and said he was undecided on the question. When asked about "gay marriage" while running to represent Massachusetts in the U.S. Senate in 1994, Mitt Romney said: "it is not appropriate at this time". In December 1996, considering the possibility of Hawaii legalizing same-sex marriage, Weld said that Massachusetts would recognize the validity of same-sex marriages licensed there. He called the Defense of Marriage Act (DOMA) unconstitutional.

=== Protection of Marriage Amendment ===
In December 1998, Representative John H. Rogers, a Democrat, proposed legislation to prevent Massachusetts from granting legal recognition to same-sex marriages established elsewhere: "a purported marriage contracted between persons of the same sex shall be neither valid nor recognized in the Commonwealth." In 1999, the Lesbian and Gay Political Alliance of Massachusetts called it a "hate bill" and a coalition of more than 150 religious leaders formed the Religious Coalition for the Freedom to Marry to oppose it. Other religious leaders organized in support of the measure. Rogers revised his proposal to define marriage as "the union of a man and a woman" when he offered it again in 2001, with the additional provision that "Any other relationship shall not be recognized as a marriage, or its legal equivalent, or receive the benefits exclusive to marriage in the Commonwealth." The chair of the Lesbian and Gay Political Alliance of Massachusetts said its prospects for passage were slim but it could serve as a countervailing proposal to efforts at establishing civil unions or providing benefits to same-sex partners of state and local government employees. Alongside these legislative maneuvers, the Gay & Lesbian Advocates & Defenders (GLAD) filed a lawsuit in state court challenging the denial of marriage rights to same-sex couples in April 2001.

In July 2001, Massachusetts Citizens for Marriage announced a campaign to amend the Constitution of Massachusetts with language similar to Rogers' legislation, called the "Protection of Marriage Amendment". Some signature gatherers complained that opponents of the amendment were harassing them and their opponents charged in turn that some signature gatherers were misrepresenting the petition's content. A sufficient number of signatures were certified in December.

The President of the Massachusetts Senate controls the calling of a constitutional convention and its agenda. Senate President Tom Birmingham, an opponent of the amendment, called a joint meeting of the General Court as a constitutional convention for June 19, 2002, and immediately adjourned it for a month saying legislators needed for time to consider the agenda items. When the constitutional convention met again on July 17, the amendment's opponents knew that proponents had the 50 votes needed for passage. Birmingham, who was presiding, moved for adjournment without considering the amendment, and his motion passed 137 to 53. He called the amendment "wrong-hearted and wrong-headed" and defended the procedure: "Everybody recognizes a vote to adjourn was a vote up or down" on the amendment. "I did gavel the last constitutional convention to a recess because I felt the members needed more time to assess... Today we saw democracy in action. They may not like it, but they lost two to one." A representative of the Catholic Action League, which supported the amendment, said: "Everything that is wrong with Massachusetts state government was apparent today for all the world to see". One legislator who voted to adjourn said: "For those of us who believe in an open democratic process, this was not a comfortable vote". State Senator Cheryl A. Jacques, an opponent of the amendment and a lesbian, said: "I'm proud to have done anything possible to defeat this hate-filled, discriminatory measure. I'll take a victory on this any way I can get it." Arlene Isaacson of the Massachusetts Gay and Lesbian Political Caucus later explained it was a critical moment because same-sex marriage had no chance of winning a popular vote at the time: "Not that we would lose by a little, because that wasn't an issue. Rather, it was that we were going to get massacred".

In April 2003, a committee of the General Court held a hearing on the constitutional amendment, but took no action. The four Roman Catholic bishops of Massachusetts, long distracted by the revelations of the sexual abuse of minors by priests, did not address the issue until late May, when they ordered pastors to read and publish a statement to mobilize their parishioners to contact their legislators to urge then to support the constitutional amendment.

=== Goodridge v. Department of Public Health ===
Seven same-sex couples represented by Gay & Lesbian Advocates & Defenders (GLAD) initiated a lawsuit in state court, Goodridge v. Department of Public Health, on April 11, 2001. GLAD attorney, Jennifer Levi, argued the case in Superior Court on behalf of the plaintiffs. Levi argued that denying same-sex couples equal marriage rights was unconstitutional under the State Constitution. On May 7, 2002, Suffolk County Superior Court Judge Thomas E. Connolly ruled that the state marriage statute was not gender-neutral, no fundamental right to same-sex marriage existed, and that limiting marriage to male-female couples was rational because "procreation is marriage's central purpose". He concluded his legal analysis by saying that the issue should be handled by the General Court.

The plaintiffs appealed directly to the Supreme Judicial Court (SJC), which heard arguments on March 4, 2003. Mary Bonauto of GLAD argued the case for the plaintiffs. Assistant Attorney General Judith Yogman represented the Massachusetts Department of Public Health. On November 18, 2003, the SJC ruled 4 to 3 that the state's ban on same-sex marriage was unconstitutional. The court said: "We declare that barring an individual from the protections, benefits, and obligations of civil marriage solely because that person would marry a person of the same sex violates the Massachusetts Constitution." It provided a definition of marriage that would meet the State Constitution's requirements: "We construe civil marriage to mean the voluntary union of two persons as spouses, to the exclusion of all others." The court stayed its ruling for 180 days (i.e. until May 17, 2004) to allow the General Court to "take such action as it may deem appropriate in light of this opinion." In a widely quoted passage from the majority ruling, Chief Justice Margaret Marshall wrote:

Civil marriage is at once a deeply personal commitment to another human being and a highly public celebration of the ideals of mutuality, companionship, intimacy, fidelity, and family. [...] Because it fulfils yearnings for security, safe haven, and connection that express our common humanity, civil marriage is an esteemed institution, and the decision whether and whom to marry is among life's momentous acts of self-definition.

Governor Mitt Romney said he disagreed with the SJC's decision, but "We obviously have to follow the law as provided by the Supreme Judicial Court, even if we don't agree with it". He said he would work with the General Court to draft a law "consistent" with the ruling. He also backed an amendment to the State Constitution to define marriage as "the union of a man and a woman" while also providing by statute "basic civil rights and appropriate benefits to same-sex couples and other nontraditional relationships." Romney quickly joined legislators in attempting to satisfy the Goodridge decision by creating civil unions for same-sex couples. His views were recognized as an attempt to establish his record on a controversial issue while planning to run for the Republican nomination for president. Former Governor Weld took credit for laying the groundwork for the decision: "A lot of the stuff we did foreshadowed the opinion." He said: "It is a thunderbolt, but a thunderbolt correctly heard."

Opponents of gay and lesbian rights opposed any compromise with the SJC. Brian Camenker, head of the Parents Rights Coalition, said: "As Martin Luther King Jr. pointed out in his letter from the Birmingham jail, there are some laws that are so unnatural that you have an obligation to openly defy them. The concept of stable, healthy gay relationships is largely a manufacturing of the gay propaganda machine." He called the decision "complete lunacy" and said: "It's beyond shocking. It's madness. It's four judges basically turning society inside out with no input from anybody else."

=== Interpreting Goodridge ===
On December 11, 2003, the Massachusetts Senate put forward legislative language creating civil unions for same-sex couples to the SJC, asking if it satisfied the court's requirements. On February 4, 2004, the court replied that it was unacceptable to allow different-sex couples marriages but same-sex couples only civil unions, that the distinction between marriage and civil unions constituted unconstitutional discrimination, even if the rights and obligations attached to each were identical. It called the difference between the terms marriage and civil union "a considered choice of language that reflects a demonstrable assigning of same-sex, largely homosexual, couples to second-class status." As for the argument that the federal government's refusal to recognize same-sex marriages as marriages justified the use of a different term, the court said: "Courts define what is constitutionally permissible, and the Massachusetts Constitution does not permit this kind of labeling... We do not abrogate the fullest measure of protection to which residents of the Commonwealth are entitled under the Massachusetts Constitution ... because those rights might not be acknowledged elsewhere." The court also reiterated the need for the General Court to modify the state's marital laws. "The purpose of the stay was to afford the Legislature an opportunity to conform the existing statutes to the provisions of the Goodridge decision." It ended: "The answer to the question is 'No.'" Religious leaders responded with strong statements on both sides of the issue. Archbishop Seán Patrick O'Malley said in a statement: "The tone and tenor of this answer clearly demonstrates the overly activist stance of the four-judge majority... Clearly, the justices who issued this opinion seem determined to blur the constitutional separation of powers and to usurp the rightful role of the Legislature." He called for the General Court to act during its scheduled joint session to put a constitutional amendment banning same-sex marriage to a popular vote. Governor Mitt Romney authored an op-ed in The Wall Street Journal that called the latest SJC ruling "wrongly decided and deeply mistaken", backed a state constitutional amendment and urged other states to take similar action, but did not endorse the idea of a federal constitutional amendment.

Without coming to agreement on how to proceed, legislative leaders considered several legal options, including passing statutes to delay the implementation of Goodridge, a strategy outlined by Mary Ann Glendon of Harvard Law School, until a referendum on a constitutional amendment could be held in November 2006. Amending the Massachusetts Constitution is a multi-year process that could not be accomplished before the date set by the SJC for the issuance of marriage licenses to same-sex couples. In order to amend the State Constitution, it is necessary for an amendment first to receive sufficient support at two state constitutional conventions, which is a joint meeting of the two houses of the General Court (the House of Representatives and the Senate), held during two successive two-year sessions, before going before the voters in a referendum during a normally scheduled November election. An amendment put forward by legislators needs a majority (101 out of 200) at two constitutional conventions and an amendment put forward by petition needs a 25% vote (50 out of 200) at two constitutional conventions.

=== Constitutional convention 2004 ===
Advocates of same-sex marriage, who had been far outnumbered as demonstrators two years earlier, were a large and constant presence in the House of Representatives throughout the 2004 convention, coordinated by MassEquality, an umbrella organization formed to respond to the public backlash against Goodridge. They had mobilized constituent telephone calls with increasing success in the weeks before the convention and emphasized the impact on children being raised by gay parents. The amendment's proponents drew support from Massachusetts Citizens for Life and larger donations than they had previously received, along with personal lobbying in localities.

The General Court met in joint session as a constitutional convention on February 11, and after six hours of debate rejected two amendments, one proposed by House Speaker Thomas M. Finneran and the other by Senate President Robert Travaglini. Both would have banned same-sex marriage, one would have made civil unions possible in the future and the other would have established civil unions. Finneran commented: "We are as divided as the nation on this. We are doing the best we can. We are human beings. We struggle. Sometimes we come up short." The convention met again the next day and defeated an amendment that defined marriage as "the union of a man and a woman" and disavowed any position on civil unions on a 103–94 vote that showed divisions in each party and Catholic legislators evenly divided. Ronald Crews of the Massachusetts Family Institute blamed Finneran's misreading of his own caucus for the failure of his own proposed language, a defeat in the convention's opening moments from which Crews found it impossible to recover.

At the end of March, after extended debate, and some tactical voting in which some legislators backed measures they would not ultimately support in order to prevent the adoption of an even stronger measure, the convention passed by a vote of 105–92 an amendment to ban same-sex marriage but allow civil unions. It also specified that civil unions should not be treated as marriages for federal purposes. The language adopted had Romney's support. One report described the process: "Tenuous and shifting coalitions held together in the final vote, despite a series of parliamentary moves by liberal lawmakers to stop anything from moving forward. In the end, an amendment that was disliked by the political right and the political left was approved because it was the only measure that could draw the support of a majority of lawmakers." The proposed amendment, if approved by a second constitutional convention in 2005, would have been placed before the voters as a referendum in November 2006. Romney believed the vote justified asking the SJC to stay its ruling requiring the issuance of marriage licenses to same-sex couples on May 17, but Attorney General Thomas Reilly said there was no legal basis for making that request.

As the constitutional convention concluded its work on the amendment, some politicians announced plans to make the November 2004 elections a referendum on same-sex marriage. In Vermont, following the enactment of civil unions legislation in 2000, a large group of its supporters had been defeated. One political action committee announced plans to target legislative candidates who supported same-sex marriage, eight Republicans and two independents. Ronald Crews of the Massachusetts Family Institute estimated a possible shift of 10 to 15 seats against same-sex marriage. The elections resulted in shifts that consistently favored supporters of same-sex marriage rights. Carl Sciortino, a gay activist and first-time candidate, drew support from supporters of same-sex marriage, but ran largely on traditional issues like education, taxation, and health care, and narrowly defeated a 16-year veteran and same-sex marriage opponent in the Democratic primary on September 14. Later that month, Speaker of the House Finneran resigned from the General Court to be replaced by Salvatore DiMasi, who backed same-sex marriage. Some candidates who backed a constitutional amendment did not make same-sex marriage a campaign issue as anticipated, but it proved critical in a few races. All 50 incumbents who opposed a constitutional amendment and faced challengers won re-election. Four supporters of Goodridge retired and successors with similar views replaced them. Five opponents of Goodridge retired and three of their successors were supporters of same-sex marriage. In special elections in the spring of 2005, three incumbents who supported a constitutional amendment lost to supporters of same-sex marriage.

=== Attempts to delay implementation ===
Despite Romney's urging, Attorney General Reilly refused to ask the SJC to stay its decision, saying that implementation was not problematic and that a popular vote on a constitutional amendment was the only way to resolve the issue. On April 16, 2004, Romney asked the General Court to pass legislation giving him authority to request a stay. He said the implementation of the SJC ruling presented legal complications, citing both a 1913 law that invalidated the marriage of non-residents if the marriage was invalid in their home state and the possibility that a popular referendum on same-sex marriage might retroactively invalidate same-sex marriages. Conservative groups like the Coalition for Marriage praised Romney for continuing to search for a way to block same-sex marriages.

In April, the Catholic Action League of Massachusetts and several conservative advocacy organizations tried to block the implementation of Goodridge in state court until the attempt to amend the State Constitution was allowed to run its course. A single justice of the SJC dismissed the complaint on May 3. A few days later, shortly before the Goodridge decision was to take effect, four conservative public interest law firms, Liberty Counsel, the Thomas More Law Center, Citizens for the Preservation of Constitutional Rights, and the American Family Association Center for Law and Policy, brought suit in federal court on behalf of the Vice President of the Catholic Action League, Robert Largess, and eleven members of the General Court to stop the May 17 marriages. It argued that the SJC's decision deprived the people of Massachusetts of their right to a republican government. On May 13, 2004, U.S. District Court Judge Joseph Tauro denied their request for an injunction delaying implementation of the decision, as did the First Circuit Court of Appeals on June 29. In November, the Supreme Court declined to hear the case without comment.

On May 14, Democratic Representative Philip Travis filed legislation to impeach Chief Justice Margaret Marshall, the author of the Goodridge decision. Another bill targeted all four justices who signed the majority decision in that case.

=== Implementation ===
With respect to implementation, the principal dispute concerned the 1913 statute that denied a marriage license to a couple if their marriage would not be valid in their state of residence. The Massachusetts Town Clerks' Association raised the issue for the first time on February 24, reporting that some of them were receiving inquiries from out-of-state couples. New York Attorney General Eliot Spitzer made the question more urgent when he issued a non-binding opinion on March 3 that "New York common law requires recognizing as valid a marriage... validly executed in another state". On March 31, Romney took the position that no other states recognized same-sex marriage and therefore residents of other states could not marry in Massachusetts. Reilly took the position that 38 states expressly denied recognition to same-sex marriages and that residents of other states could obtain licenses.

Localities that supported the right of same-sex couples to marry resisted both those interpretations. On April 11, Provincetown's Board of Selectmen decided their town clerk would approve marriage license applications from any couple that swore, as was customary, that their marriage was lawful. The town manager said: "We've never been the marriage police with heterosexual couples, and we're not about to start with same-sex couples". Worcester's clerk took a similar position on April 16. Before the end of the month, an investigation by The Boston Globe showed that since 1976 town clerks had been repeatedly instructed not to question applicants for marriage licenses about their eligibility. A spokesman for Governor Romney said that the Goodridge decision "changed the definition of marriage, it changed the way the new marriage forms look, and it changed the way city and town clerks will carry out the requirements of the law."

When Romney suggested confusion over the 1913 law justified postponing the implementation of Goodridge, Mary Bonauto, the lawyer who successfully argued Goodridge, suggested he get the law repealed: "If he's so concerned about problems, he can file an emergency bill to repeal that law. Massachusetts has basically said discriminating against people of the same sex is unconstitutional. So why would we try so hard to uphold another state's discriminatory law?" She asked: "Under the governor's logic, if some state again started banning marriages between Catholics and Protestants, then would Massachusetts enforce that?" In an interview on April 23, Romney said: "Massachusetts should not become the Las Vegas of same-sex marriage. We do not intend to export our marriage confusion to the entire nation." His spokesman announced he was sending letters to the governors and attorneys general of the other states to explain his view that same-sex marriage was not legal in their state and asking "if we're wrong" about that. Denying license to all out-of-state couples became known as "the Romney plan". It also allowed visitors from Ontario to marry, since same-sex marriage was legal there. The governor's legal counsel, Daniel Winslow, warned that a justice of the peace who could not in conscience officiate at a same-sex wedding should resign.

On May 4, when the Romney Administration began training clerks to handle applications from same-sex couples, a report from The Boston Globe called it "a major shift from the governor's earlier stance on enforcing limitations on licensing gay marriage." The new forms were gender-neutral, identifying the applicants as "Party A" and Party B" and asking each to check a box for either male or female. Clerks could require proof of residency if they asked that of all couples, but needed only to have applicants swear that there were no legal impediments to their marrying in Massachusetts. The administration said that earlier reports had been premature. Some towns and clerks announced plans to knowingly issue licenses to out-of-staters, including Provincetown, Worcester, and Somerville. Bonauto said that GLAD's position was that applicants should never be less than honest, "let alone on a form signed under oath".

=== First same-sex marriages ===
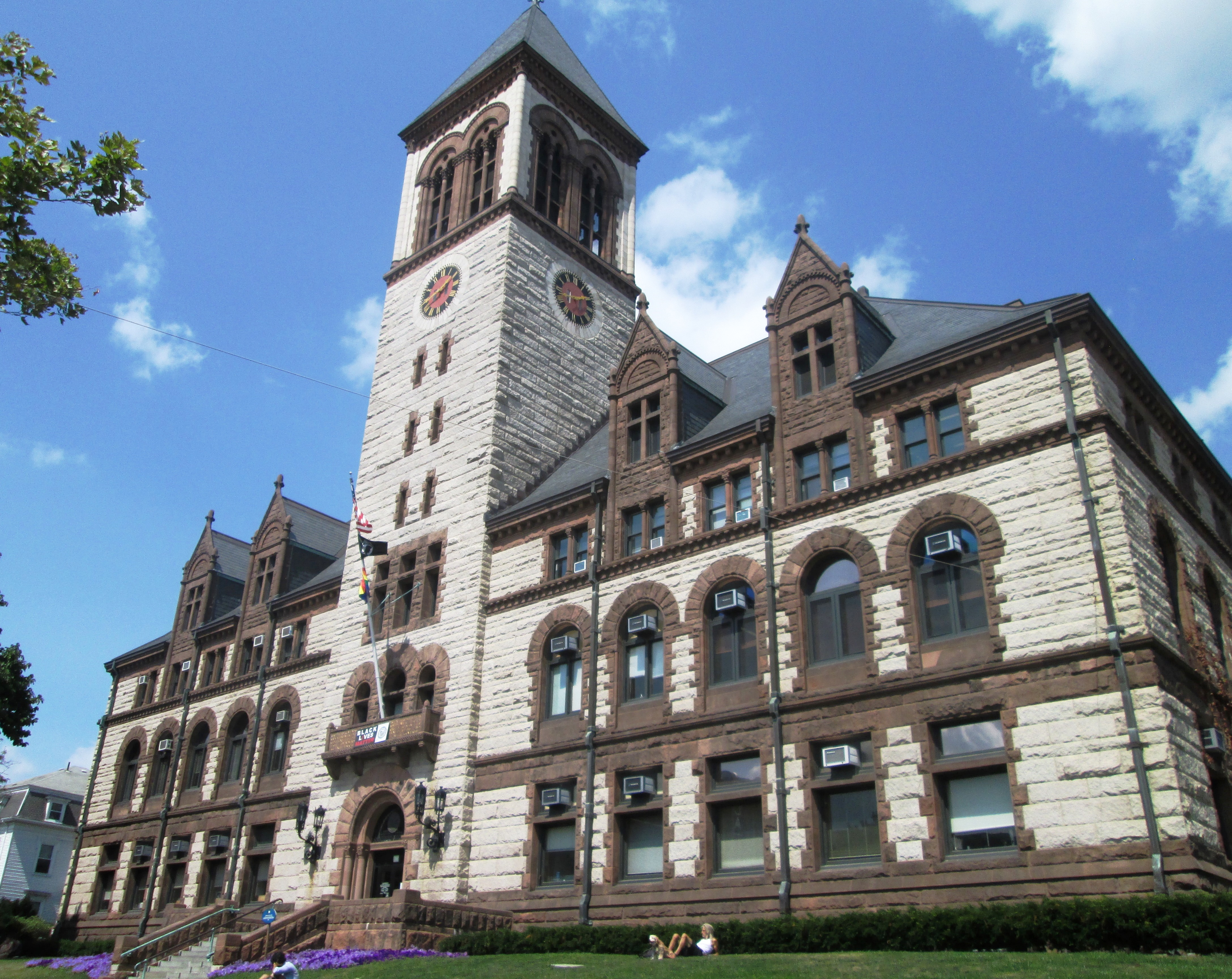
Cambridge City Hall, where the first legal same-sex marriages in Massachusetts, and in the United States, were performed on May 17, 2004

On May 16, 2004, Cambridge, which The New York Times described as having "a well-known taste for erudite rebelliousness", decorated the wooden staircases of City Hall with white organza. Hundreds of applicants and supporters in celebratory dress–"glittery party hats and boutonnieres"–gathered in the street. City officials opened the building at 12:01 a.m. May 17 "for a rousing party, with wedding cake, sparkling cider and the music of the Cambridge Community Chorus." Some 262 couples obtained licenses, starting with Marcia Hams and Susan Shepherd. The first to wed in Cambridge were Tanya McCloskey and Marcia Kadish at 9:15 a.m. Cambridge City Clerk Margaret Drury was the first city clerk in the U.S. to perform a legal same-sex marriage. Massachusetts has a three-day waiting period before issuing marriage licenses, but many couples obtained waivers of the waiting period in order to be wed as soon as possible.

Other cities and towns in Massachusetts began issuing applications during normal business hours. Boston Mayor Thomas Menino greeted three of the couples who were plaintiffs in Goodridge and said: "We've broken down the barrier. I am so proud of these people. I am very proud to be mayor of this city today." The first to marry in Boston City Hall were Tom Weikle and Joe Rogers, who lined up for their license application at 5:30 a.m. and were wed about 11 a.m. by Boston's city clerk. Rejecting the Romney's insistence that the 1913 statute be respected, Somerville Mayor Joseph Curtatone addressed a crowd of same-sex couples that included several from New York gathered in front of Town Hall at 8 am.: "No matter who you are or where you come from, if you fill out the application, you will be given a license to marry. Those of you from out of state, welcome to Somerville." The seven couples who were party to the Goodridge lawsuit were all wed on May 17, beginning with Robert Compton and David Wilson at Boston's Arlington Street Church. There were sizable celebrations in Northampton, Worcester, and Provincetown, while "explicit protests were scattered and few".

A survey from The Boston Globe found that half of the couples who applied for licenses on the first day had been partners for a decade or more. Two-thirds were women and 30% were raising children. Only the towns that had made an issue of issuing licenses to out-of-staters had appreciable numbers of them. In the first week, 2,468 same-sex couples applied for licenses, including at least 164 from 27 other states and the District of Columbia. News coverage of the day's events in Massachusetts was extensive, though limited outside the United States. The Today Show broadcast live coverage from outside Boston City Hall. The three major networks lead their evening news shows with wedding coverage. The Cincinnati Enquirer ran the tag "For better or for worse" above the headline "Same-sex weddings make history". It was the lead story in The Washington Post and The New York Times.

Governor Romney in a brief statement said: "All along, I have said an issue as fundamental to society as the definition of marriage should be decided by the people. Until then, I intend to follow the law and expect others to do the same." President George W. Bush took note of these events in Massachusetts with a statement calling for a federal constitutional amendment "defining and protecting marriage as a union of a man and a woman as husband and wife." It said: "The sacred institution of marriage should not be redefined by a few activist judges. All Americans have a right to be heard in this debate." On the same day, non-binding opinions by the attorneys general of two more neighboring states fueled debate about enforcing the 1913 law. On May 17, Richard Blumenthal wrote in a letter to Romney that the status of an out-of-state same-sex marriage in Connecticut was not "automatically void", and Patrick C. Lynch reported that Rhode Island only invalidated a marriage that violated public policy as in cases of "bigamy, incest or mental incompetence".

=== Constitutional convention 2005 ===
The constitutional convention took up the compromise amendment approved in 2004. It failed on a vote of 157–39 on September 14, after many moderate legislators who had initially supported it refused to and most legislators opposed to same-sex marriage abandoned its compromise language. State Senator Brian Lees, a Republican who co-sponsored the amendment in the previous convention, explained why he withdrew his support: "Gay marriage has begun, and life has not changed for the citizens of the commonwealth, with the exception of those who can now marry. This amendment which was an appropriate measure or compromise a year ago, is no longer, I feel, a compromise today." Opponents turned instead to an alternative method of amending the Constitution that they thought would allow them to present an uncompromising ban on same-sex marriage to the voters. This method would require the collection of thousands of signatures on petitions but would need the support of only a quarter of the legislators to become a referendum. The process of gathering signatures was already underway when the legislators voted to reject the 2004 compromise. Travis explained that the opponents' fervor came in reaction to the position taken by gay and lesbian activists:

We all want to give people the rights to have insurance and transfer property. No one is so rotten to the core that they wouldn't even consider that. That would be inappropriate. But we don't want to call it marriage. And remember, they held out for marriage. Civil unions weren't acceptable to the gay community in Massachusetts. They didn't want a second-sister relationship like they have in Vermont. They wanted the full-blown description with the title of marriage.

=== Initiative to amend the State Constitution ===
==== Petitions ====
An organization called VoteOnMarriage.org organized the petition drive. Its backers included Governor Romney, former Boston Mayor Raymond Flynn, former SJC Justice Joseph Nolan, and Gilbert Thompson, president of the board of the Black Ministerial Alliance of Greater Boston. The language of their amendment was:

When recognizing marriages entered into after the adoption of this amendment by the people, the Commonwealth and its political subdivisions shall define marriage only as the union of one man and one woman.

Unlike amendments in other states, the amendment did not explicitly forbid other forms of legal relationships for same-sex couples, such as civil unions or domestic partnerships. It did not attempt to invalidate same-sex marriages licensed since Goodridge.

Attorney General Reilly certified the language and format of the petitions as valid on September 7, 2005. Advocates of same-sex marriage objected that the proposed amendment was clearly designed to reverse the SJC decision, a violation of the State Constitution's rule that amendments could not be used for that purpose. Deval Patrick, Reilly's principal opponent for the Democratic nomination for governor, said "There was a strong argument that this should have gone a different way." Massachusetts Secretary of State William F. Galvin said: "I think this is one of those instances where the institution of gay marriage may be less divisive to society than the referendum campaign will be. The emotions that this kind of issue brings out can be very detrimental to society. It has been around for a year and any honest person can conclude that it has not been detrimental to society."

VoteOnMarriage.org collected 170,000 signatures before the December 7, 2005 deadline, almost three times the number required. Paid signature collectors from Arno Political Consultants subsequently revealed that an unknown but large number of these signatures had been collected through fraud. The collectors told voters that they were signing a petition about a different issue or that the petitions were in favor of same-sex marriage. In a case led by attorney Jennifer Levi, GLAD challenged Reilly's certification of the petitions in court, claiming the effort contradicted a provision of the Massachusetts Constitution (Article 48, Section 2), which prohibits the use of such petitions for "reversal of a judicial decision." In July, the SJC ruled unanimously that the amendment did not constitute "reversal" of a judicial decision, given that the proposed amendment sought to define only those marriages performed after its passage. If passed, the amendment would have restricted future marriages to different-sex couples but would not have invalidated the approximately 8,000 same-sex marriage licenses already issued.

==== Constitutional convention 2006 ====
On July 12, 2006, the General Court sitting as a constitutional convention voted 100 to 91 to postpone action on the initiative amendment until November 9, 2006, two days after the elections. Supporters of same-sex marriage sought the delay, which the amendment's backers denounced and Romney criticized it. As that date neared, Arline Isaacson, a lobbyist for the Gay and Lesbian Political Caucus, was not optimistic about her side's chances and Senate President Robert Travaglini was considering allowing a vote to adjourn without acting on the measure. Instead, on November 9, 2006, the legislators in convention voted 109 to 87 to recess until January 2, the last day of the legislative session.

On November 19, 2006, Governor Romney led a rally against the General Court's delaying tactics in front of the Massachusetts State House. Romney said: "The issue before us is not whether same-sex couples should marry. The issue before us today is whether 109 legislators will follow the constitution." He said he would ask a justice of the SJC to order the initiative placed on the ballot because the legislators were refusing to fulfill their constitutional obligations. The next day, he sent the 109 legislators a copy of the State Constitution with a letter underscoring the document's provision that the legislators sitting as a constitutional convention shall vote on initiatives: "Not 'may' vote ... not 'could' vote ... not 'perhaps' vote ... It's very clear." His reference was to the clause: "final legislative action in the joint session ... shall be taken only by call of the yeas and nays". He filed the lawsuit as one member of a group of private citizens on November 24, citing 5 occasions in 24 years in which the General Court failed to vote on valid initiatives. Other plaintiffs included Raymond Flynn and officials of VoteOnMarriage.org and the Catholic Action League of Massachusetts. Named as defendants were the Massachusetts Secretary of State, who oversees the preparation of election ballots, William F. Galvin, and the President of the Massachusetts Senate who chairs joint sessions of the General Court, Senator Travaglini. After a 20-minute hearing on November 30, Associate Justice Judith A. Cowin ordered an expedited hearing before the full SJC on December 20. At that hearing, both sides agreed that the SJC could not enforce an order against the General Court. An attorney for the plaintiffs said: "We're not asking you to tell the General Court how to do their business. We're only asking you to declare what their constitutional obligations are." The First Assistant Attorney General representing the General Court countered that the voters were free to replace the legislators at the next election.

On December 27, 2006, the SJC ruled unanimously that Article 48 of the State Constitution requires legislators to take recorded votes on initiative amendments. The SJC's opinion authored by Justice John M. Greaney said the legislators' duties were "beyond serious debate", and described their constitutional obligations:

The members of the joint session have a constitutional duty to vote, by the yeas and nays, on the merits of all pending initiative amendments before recessing on January 2, 2007. With respect to legislative action on proposals for constitutional amendments introduced ... by initiative petition, the language of art. 48 is not ambiguous. Today's discussion and holding on the meaning of the duty lays any doubt to rest... Those members who now seek to avoid their lawful obligations, by a vote to recess without a roll call vote by yeas and nays on the merits of the initiative amendment ... ultimately will have to answer to the people who elected them.

He explained that the court could take no action against the plaintiffs in the case: "[T]here is no presently articulated judicial remedy for the Legislature's indifference to, or defiance of, its constitutional duties. We have no statutory authority to issue a declaratory judgment concerning the constitutionality of the legislative action, or inaction, in this matter." VoteOnMarriage.org, which had gathered signatures on the proposal the legislators had failed to vote on, sued on December 13, asking a federal court to order them to vote or, in the absence of a vote, to order the amendment placed on the ballot. It also sought $500,000 from the 109 legislators who voted to adjourn, the cost of its signature-gathering campaign. Arline Isaacson, one of the leaders of the Massachusetts Gay and Lesbian Political Caucus, urged the General Court to adjourn without voting on the amendment. She said: "We know that if the Legislature votes on the amendment, we will lose this year and next year, and it will go to the ballot, where it will likely pass." Senator Brian Lees said he thought the General Court would not be swayed by the ruling and he stood by his opposition to taking a vote: "I will never vote to put a form of discrimination into the state constitution." Before the legislators met, Deval Patrick, who was due to succeed Romney as governor on January 4, 2007, said: "I hope by whatever means appropriate, the constitutional convention today ends this debate. I think a vote on adjournment is a vote on the merits." The joint session of the General Court, promptly after coming to order and without debate, voted on the amendment on January 2, 2007, the last day of its 2005–2006 session. There were 62 votes in favor and 132 opposed, a sufficient number to require the amendment's consideration at another constitutional convention. Isaacson said that the SJC ruling "really tipped the scales against us."

==== Constitutional convention 2007 ====
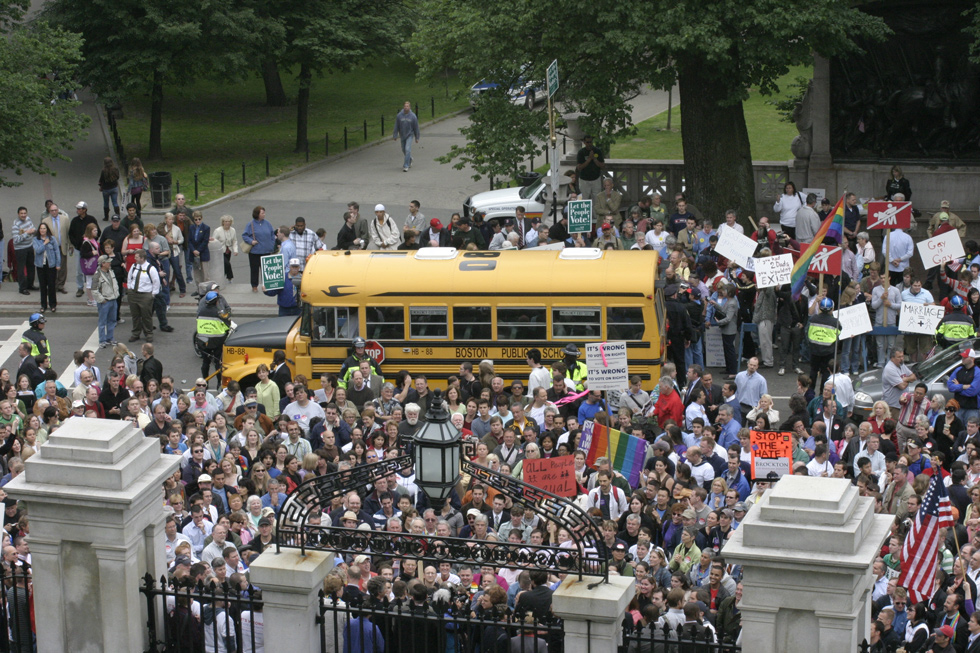
Supporters and opponents of same-sex marriage at the Massachusetts State House on June 14, 2007, when legislators met in a constitutional convention to vote on whether or not to endorse a ballot option to ban same-sex marriage

When the General Court met as a constitutional convention in June 2007, observers anticipated a closer vote than the previous January because of retirements and some announced changes in position. Advocates of the amendment charged that the political pressure on legislators on the part of Governor Deval Patrick and legislative leaders included job offers and trading votes on other issues. Opponents of the amendment cast the vote as one of conscience and personal rather than political lobbying. The day before the convention, the state's four Roman Catholic bishops in a letter to legislators endorsed putting the issue to a popular vote: "[T]he marriage debate should not be reserved only to lawyers and lawmakers. Every citizen has a stake in the outcome, because every citizen has a stake in the well-being of the family." Cardinal O'Malley called several legislators to lobby for their votes and Governor Patrick said he offered some help in their re-election campaigns. On June 14, 2007, the convention opened and proceeded immediately to a vote on the issue without debate. The measure failed to obtain the required 50 votes, as 45 voted in favor, 151 opposed the measure, and four were absent or abstained from the vote. Two new legislators who were thought to support the amendment voted against it, while nine who had supported it in January, seven Democrats and two Republicans, changed their votes to oppose it. VoteOnMarriage.Org announced it would attempt to unseat legislators who had switched sides to defeat the amendment.

=== Marriages of non-residents ===
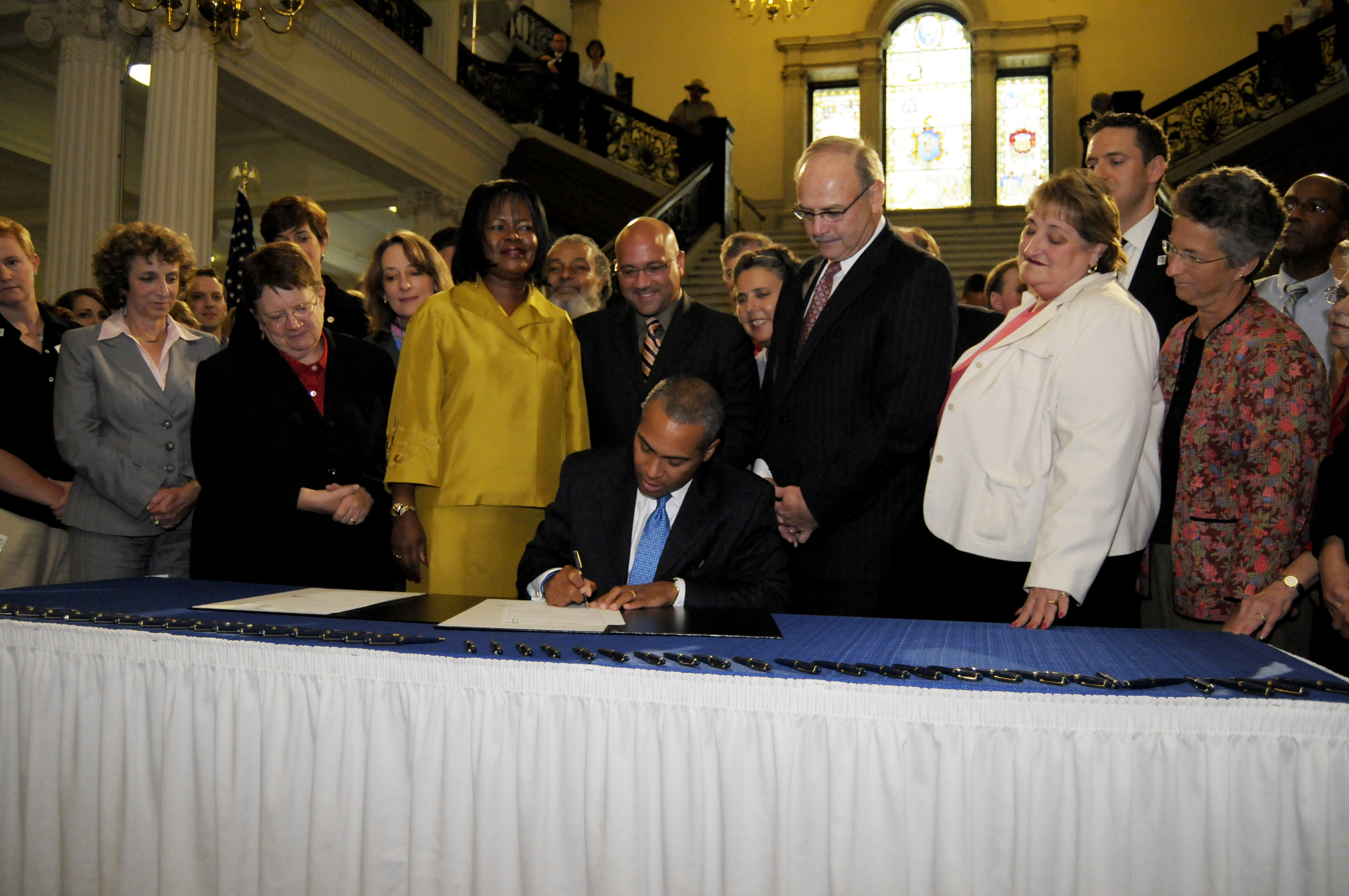
Governor Deval Patrick signing a bill repealing the 1913 statute that prevented out-of-state same-sex couples from marrying in Massachusetts, July 31, 2008

A Massachusetts law enacted in 1913 invalidated the marriage of non-residents if the marriage was invalid in the state where they lived. Historians and legal scholars believe it originated in an upsurge of anti-miscegenation sentiment associated with the notoriety of champion boxer Jack Johnson's marriages to white women. Though moribund for decades, it was used to prevent same-sex couples who were residents of other states from marrying in Massachusetts. As the date neared for the issuance of marriage licenses to same-sex couples, Governor Romney and some town clerks disputed how and whether that law should be enforced, and Romney had used the state's authority to block the same-sex marriages of non-residents from being properly recorded. He told a news conference: "We certainly won't record on our public health records marriages that are on the face of them not consistent with the law". The clerks soon relented under orders from Attorney General Reilly. In June 2004, GLAD brought a lawsuit, Cote-Whitacre v. Department of Public Health, on behalf of several out-of-state same-sex couples and several town clerks who objected to being forced to discriminate in denying licenses to such couples. The SJC upheld the law on March 30, 2006, though it allowed that residents of states like New York and Vermont, which did not explicitly exclude same-sex couples from marriage, might pursue the case further. On September 29, 2006, Superior Court Justice Thomas Connolly determined that same-sex couples who reside in Rhode Island can marry in Massachusetts after finding "that same-sex marriage is ... not prohibited in Rhode Island". In May 2007, Judge Connolly declared valid the marriages of several same-sex couples, residents of New York, who married in Massachusetts before July 6, 2006, when a New York court issued a ruling that same-sex marriage was not legal there, New York's first explicit prohibition on same-sex marriage. In July 2007, the Department of Public Health ruled that same-sex couples from New Mexico, where whether the law prohibited same-sex marriage was disputed, can obtain marriage licenses in Massachusetts.

On June 15, 2007, following the defeat of the initiative to amend the State Constitution, Kris Mineau of the Massachusetts Family Institute warned that gay and lesbian activists would try to repeal the 1913 law next so that "This radical social experiment will be exported to the other 49 states". He said its repeal would "open the floodgates for Massachusetts to become the Mecca for same-sex marriage. Their goal is to strike down the marriage restrictions in every state. Their launching pad will be Massachusetts." Isaacson said "no one is rushing" to take on that issue and that "In the short term, we want everyone to rest, breathe and appreciate the incredible victory that took place". Liberal columnist Ellen Goodman wrote: "Las Vegas? Mecca? So far, little Rhode Island is the only state that allows gay residents to wed in Massachusetts. We are the Las Vegas of Rhode Island."

On June 30, 2008, the Williams Institute at the University of California, Los Angeles, in reply to an inquiry from Daniel O'Connell, Massachusetts Secretary of Housing and Urban Development, reported that it calculated that allowing non-resident same-sex couples to marry would add $37 million to the Massachusetts economy in each of the next three years and add 330 jobs for the same period.

The Massachusetts General Court took up the repeal of the 1913 law the next month. On July 15, the Massachusetts Senate voted to repeal it on a unanimous voice vote. The House approved the legislation on July 29, 2008 on a 118 to 35 vote, and Governor Deval Patrick signed the bill into law on July 31. It took effect immediately. Patrick said: "I think other states will make their own judgments, and I expect them to–that's their own business. All we can do is tend our own garden, and make sure that it's weeded, and I think we've weeded out a discriminatory law that we should have." MassResistance mounted a petition drive for a referendum to reinstate the law in October 2008, but failed to collect enough signatures.

=== Recognition of legal relationships from other jurisdictions ===
On July 26, 2012, in a case involving a same-sex couple who established a civil union in Vermont in 2003, the SJC ruled unanimously in Elia-Warnken v. Elia that Massachusetts recognizes a same-sex civil union established in another jurisdiction as the legal equivalent of a marriage. Chief Justice Roderick L. Ireland wrote: "Refusing to recognize a legal spousal relationship that granted rights equal to those acquired through marriage, in a State that did not allow same-sex couples to marry at the time, would only perpetuate the discrimination against same-sex couples" that led the court to tell the Senate in 2004 that civil unions would not suffice as an alternative to marriage for same-sex couples. The SJC took a comparable position on September 12 with respect to domestic partnerships established in other jurisdictions in a case involving a California couple, Hunter v. Rose.

=== Subsequent developments ===
Boston Mayor Thomas Menino speaking at a same-sex marriage rally at City Hall Plaza on March 26, 2013

On July 10, 2008, the Supreme Judicial Court ruled unanimously in Charron v. Amaral that a surviving partner in a same-sex relationship, that was prevented from marrying before the same-sex marriage ban was declared unconstitutional, could not sue for loss of consortium. The court ruled that its decision in Goodridge could not be applied retroactively. Previously, a lower court had granted summary judgment to the defendants.

Eleven years after legalization in Massachusetts, the U.S. Supreme Court legalized same-sex marriage nationwide with its Obergefell v. Hodges ruling on June 26, 2015. Several state politicians from across the political spectrum welcomed the ruling. Governor Charlie Baker said, "For me, the issue of marriage equality is personal. I'm pleased the Commonwealth has already recognized same-sex marriages in our state, and with today's Supreme Court decision every American citizen across the nation will have equal protection under the law and the right to marry the person they choose." Senator Ed Markey said, "With this momentous ruling from the Supreme Court we end a chapter of discrimination in our country's history and start a new one that says all Americans have the right to pursue happiness by marrying the person they love. Today, we raise our voices for equality. We raise our voices for an end to all forms of discrimination. We raise our voices for justice. It's about basic freedoms for our friends, neighbors and families. Any effort to deny equal protections under the law is unfair, discriminatory, and unconstitutional – and that is just plain wrong. I am so proud to represent the state that has become a model across the country and the world on LGBT inclusion and acceptance."

In August 2023, Boston removed all mentions of sex on marriage licence forms "in the hopes of offering more dignified experiences for all".

Opponents of same-sex marriage argued in 2004 that legalizing same-sex marriages would open the door to other types of relationships being recognized as marriages, including polygamy and polyamory. Supporters called this line of reasoning "scare tactics". In 2020, the Somerville City Council passed an ordinance recognizing polyamorous domestic partnerships, allowing those in polyamorous relationships easier access to their partners' health insurance.

== Native American nations ==
The Mashpee Wampanoag Tribe and the Wampanoag Tribe of Gay Head have jurisdiction over marriages and divorces performed under tribal law. As a result, it is unclear if same-sex marriage is legal on their reservations. While there are no records of same-sex marriages as understood from a Western perspective being performed in Native American cultures, there is evidence for identities and behaviours that may be placed on the LGBT spectrum. Many of these cultures recognized two-spirit individuals who were born male but wore women's clothing and performed everyday household work and artistic handiwork which were regarded as belonging to the feminine sphere. This two-spirit status allowed for marriages between two biological males to be performed in some of these tribes. In the Massachusett language, the term for two-spirit is nees manut8ak.

== Marriage statistics ==
In the first year, more than 6,200 same-sex couples had married in Massachusetts. That number fell to only 1,900 marriages in the second year. Out of the total of more than 8,100 marriages, 64% involved lesbian couples. In comparison, more than 36,000 heterosexual couples are married each year in Massachusetts. The number of marriage licenses issued to same-sex couples in Massachusetts leveled off at about 1,500 a year in 2006 and 2007. They represented about 4% of all marriages in the state. A total of 22,406 same-sex marriages were performed in Massachusetts from 2004 to 2012, mostly in Barnstable, Middlesex and Suffolk counties. Subtracting the first year total, an average of 2,025 marriages were performed each subsequent year. Approximately 32,000 same-sex couples had married in Massachusetts by 2024.

The 2020 U.S. census showed that there were 20,913 married same-sex couple households (9,037 male couples and 11,876 female couples) and 12,539 unmarried same-sex couple households in Massachusetts.

Massachusetts marriage statistics (2004–2016)
Year	Heterosexual marriages	Male marriages	Female marriages	Total marriages	% same-sex marriages
2004 (Note: Since May)	27,196	2,176	3,945	33,317	18.37%
2005	37,447	736	1,324	39,507	5.21%
2006	36,550	543	899	37,993	3.80%
2007	36,373	591	933	37,897	4.02%
2008	34,734	865	1,303	36,923	5.87%
2009	33,582	1,083	1,731	36,407	7.73%
2010	34,094	852	1,483	36,429	6.41%
2011	34,115	800	1,412	36,327	6.09%
2012	35,142	722	1,191	37,055	5.16%
2013	33,168	1,502	1,694	36,820	8.68%
2014	33,592	1,182	1,475	36,284	7.32%
2015	35,446	903	1,094	37,450	5.33%
2016	37,582	911	1,119	39,652	5.12%
Total	449,471	12,866	19,603	482,061	6.74%

== Public opinion ==
Public opinion for same-sex marriage in Massachusetts
Poll source	Dates administered	Sample size	Margin of error	Support	Opposition	Do not know / refused
Public Religion Research Institute	March 9 – December 7, 2023	442 adults	?	81%	15%	4%
Public Religion Research Institute	March 11 – December 14, 2022	?	?	83%	12%	5%
Public Religion Research Institute	March 8 – November 9, 2021	?	?	85%	14%	1%
Public Religion Research Institute	January 7 – December 20, 2020	1,017 adults	?	77%	22%	1%
Public Religion Research Institute	April 5 – December 23, 2017	1,280 adults	?	80%	13%	7%
Public Religion Research Institute	May 18, 2016 – January 10, 2017	1,952 adults	?	74%	19%	7%
Public Religion Research Institute	April 29, 2015 – January 7, 2016	1,521 adults	?	76%	18%	6%
Public Religion Research Institute	April 2, 2014 – January 4, 2015	984 adults	?	73%	21%	6%
New York Times/CBS News/YouGov	September 20 – October 1, 2014	2,389 likely voters	± 2.2%	71%	19%	10%
Public Policy Polling	September 20–23, 2013	616 voters	± 4.0%	60%	28%	12%
Public Policy Polling	May 1–2, 2013	1,539 voters	± 2.5%	58%	32%	10%
Public Policy Polling	June 22–24, 2012	902 voters	± 3.3%	62%	30%	8%
Public Policy Polling	March 16–18, 2012	936 voters	± 3.2%	58%	31%	11%
Public Policy Polling	September 16–18, 2011	791 voters	± 3.5%	60%	30%	10%
Public Policy Polling	June 2–5, 2011	957 voters	± 3.2%	59%	33%	8%
Decision Research	May 2005	600 registered voters	± 4.0%	62%	35%	3%
University of New Hampshire's Survey Center	March 5–8, 2005	501 adults	± 4.4%	56%	37%	7%
KRC Communications Research	February 18–19, 2004	400 adults	± 5.0%	35%	53%	12%
KRC Communications Research	November 2003	?	?	48%	43%	9%
KRC Communications Research	April 2003	?	± 5.0%	50%	44%	6%

== See also ==
- LGBT rights in Massachusetts
- Same-sex marriage law in the United States by state
- Same-sex marriage legislation in the United States
- Same-sex marriage status in the United States by state
- Divorce of same-sex couples
