= MassEquality =

- The MassEquality logo

- U.S. Commonwealth of Massachusetts
- Founded: 2001
- Location: Boston, Massachusetts
- Region served: Massachusetts
- Key people: Tanya Neslusan, executive director
- Website: massequality.org

MassEquality is a Boston-based organization that seeks to promote LGBT rights in the U.S. Commonwealth of Massachusetts. It supported the implementation of Goodridge v. Department of Public Health, the Massachusetts Supreme Judicial Court's 2003 decision that legalized same-sex marriage, and opposed efforts to adopt an amendment to the Massachusetts Constitution seeking to limit the impact of or annul the ruling.

The coalition was formed in the late 1990s in response to the first attempts in the Massachusetts state legislature to pass a "defense of marriage act" that would have prohibited the recognition of same-sex marriage. MassEquality was formally incorporated in late 2001 as a 501(c)4 advocacy organization, though it operated without staff until after the Goodridge decision.

The organization is a member of the Equality Federation.

== Constitutional amendment advocacy ==
The Goodridge ruling reignited attempts to amend the Massachusetts Constitution to ban civil recognition of same-sex marriage. In late 2003, the coalition of organizations that formed the Steering Committee for MassEquality hired its first staffer, Campaign Coordinator Marty Rouse. Rouse, an experienced political operative who had helped members of the Vermont legislature recover from election losses they suffered as a consequence of supporting civil union legislation, quickly implemented a campaign to marshal the coalition's resources and build a field operation to bolster the LGBTQ movement's legislative lobbying.

In the wake of the Goodridge ruling, legislative debate on a "defense of marriage" amendment in Massachusetts was intense. The debate, conducted in a joint session of the Massachusetts House of Representatives and Senate, a Constitutional Convention that spanned four days over nearly two months, was carried live on C-SPAN. During that time, MassEquality identified and mobilized supporters of same-sex marriage in an attempt to defeat the proposed constitutional amendment.

On March 29, 2004, the Massachusetts legislature passed by a five-vote margin a proposed constitutional amendment that would ban same-sex marriage and provide civil unions for same-sex couples. This amendment, called the Travaglini-Lees amendment, needed to win a majority of the votes in a second constitutional convention before being put to a popular vote. It was defeated in a joint session of the legislature on September 29, 2005, by a vote of 39-157, due largely to increased public support for same-sex marriage in Massachusetts and to victories by several legislative candidates supportive of same-sex marriage backed by MassEquality.

Opponents of same-sex marriage then launched a new initiative to pass a constitutional amendment banning same-sex marriage. This new amendment sought to ban same-sex marriage without creating an alternative institution for same-sex couples. This amendment was brought as an initiative petition, requiring collection of a certain number of voters' signatures, followed by a vote of one-quarter of legislators meeting in joint session in both the 2005-2006 legislative session and the 2007-2008 session. The Massachusetts legislature adopted this amendment just before its 2005-2006 session ended, but defeated it during its 2007-2008 session.

== Other activities ==
Following the defeat of the amendment, MassEquality expanded its mission to work for equal rights and opportunities for all LGBT people from cradle to grave—in schools, in marriage and family life, at work and in retirement. Since that expansion, it helped pass a statewide anti-bullying law and secured an executive order from Governor Deval Patrick prohibiting discrimination against transgender people in state agencies and state contracts. Kara Suffredini, an attorney with over a decade of LGBT policy and movement experience, was appointed executive director in 2010.

In 2021, MassEquality moved to Worcester, to better support its shift in focus to prioritize local organizing and education, in pursuit of lived equality, statewide, in addition to its traditional lobbying and electoral activities.

== Parade invitation ==
On February 28, 2014, following pressure on the part of Boston Mayor Martin J. Walsh, the organizers of South Boston's St. Patrick's Day Parade, which had banned open participation by gay organizations for 20 years and in 1995 won a Supreme Court case that supported their stance, announced that MassEquality would be welcome to participate in the parade. It set conditions that MassEquality's marchers not wear shirts or carry signs that display the word gay or refer to sexual orientation. One organizer said: "They can march under the MassEquality banner. We'd be happy to have them here. And we’d be proud to have them here. Everybody knows who MassEquality is." MassEquality leaders welcomed the opportunity to discuss the question with parade organizers directly and said: "MassEquality has not accepted any invitation to march, and will only consider accepting an invitation that allows LGBT people to march openly.... LGBT people should not have to silence who they are to celebrate other parts of their identities."

== See also ==
- MassResistance
- LGBT rights in Massachusetts
- Same-sex marriage in Massachusetts
- List of LGBT rights organizations
