= LGBTQ rights in Massachusetts =

- Massachusetts (US)
- Legal status: Legal since 1974 (Commonwealth v. Balthazar)
- Gender identity: Transgender people may change gender
- Discrimination protections: Yes, both sexual orientation and gender identity

Family rights
- Recognition of relationships: Same-sex marriage since 2004
- Adoption: Yes

Lesbian, gay, bisexual, transgender, and queer (LGBTQ) people in the U.S. state of Massachusetts enjoy the same rights as non-LGBTQ people. The state is widely regarded as one of the most LGBTQ-supportive states in the country. In 2004, it became the first U.S. state to grant marriage licenses to same-sex couples after the decision in Goodridge v. Department of Public Health, and the sixth jurisdiction worldwide, after the Netherlands, Belgium, Ontario, British Columbia, and Quebec.

Same-sex sexual activity has been legal since 1974, in accordance with a landmark decision affirming the right to sexual privacy from the Massachusetts Supreme Judicial Court. State law bans discrimination on the basis of sexual orientation and gender identity in employment, housing, public accommodations, credit and union practices. In November 2018, it became the first state in the country to support transgender protections through popular vote. In addition, same-sex couples are allowed to adopt, and transgender people may change their legal gender without undergoing sex reassignment surgery. In April 2019, Massachusetts became the 16th U.S. state to ban conversion therapy on LGBT minors.

Boston, the state capital, has been ranked one of the most LGBTQ-friendly cities in the United States, noted for its LGBT dating scene, events, nightlife, clubs and bars. Provincetown, located at the tip of Cape Cod, is famous internationally for high LGBT acceptance and visibility. Northampton is often ranked as the town with the most lesbian couples per capita in the entire United States.

Massachusetts has still not legislatively repealed its defunct sodomy ban, and the common-law gay panic defense usage within the state courts, as of December 2024; despite being regarded as a Democratic Party stronghold. July 2025 saw increased efforts to pass legislation repealing the state's aforementioned sodomy law in the Massachusetts legislature.

== Legality of same-sex sexual activity ==
In 1641, Nathaniel Ward's legal code was enacted in the state, which prohibited sodomy.

In Commonwealth v. Balthazar, in 1974, the Massachusetts Supreme Judicial Court ruled that the statute which prohibited "any unnatural and lascivious act with another person" was inapplicable to "private, consensual conduct of adults".

Massachusetts has not repealed its sodomy law and it remains on the books. The Massachusetts General Court has voted down bills in committee for years, to repeal and abolish sodomy laws within sections of both §34 and §35. During the 2018 session of the Massachusetts General Court, outdated laws on abortion, adultery and fornication were repealed, but not the laws on sodomy, anal sex, and oral sex still listed within sections 34 and 35. Presently, Massachusetts does not restrict private sexual behavior between consenting adults, as these laws are permanently enjoined by Commonwealth v. Balthazar and Lawrence v. Texas. It has two statutes that criminalize homosexual activity: §34 prohibits the "abominable and detestable crime against nature" and §35 prohibits "any unnatural and lascivious act with another person."

In January 2024, a bill unanimously passed the Massachusetts Senate to repeal the state's archaic 400-year-old laws criminalizing same-sex sexual activity. In June 2025, the Massachusetts House of Representatives advanced the bill, and on July 17, 2025, a Senate committee scheduled it for floor consideration on July 24, 2025. Massachusetts is the only state in New England which has not legislatively repealed its sodomy laws. Michigan and Massachusetts are the only northern U.S. states where same-sex sexual activity is still legislatively criminalized.

== Recognition of same-sex relationships ==
=== Marriage ===
Massachusetts authorized same-sex marriages within the state following the Supreme Judicial Court (SJC) ruling on November 18, 2003 in Goodridge v. Department of Public Health that it was unconstitutional under the state Constitution for state agencies to restrict marriage to heterosexual couples only. The Court gave the state Legislature 180 days to enact laws pursuant to the judgment. In the absence of legislative action, Governor Mitt Romney ordered town clerks to begin issuing marriage certificates to same-sex couples beginning May 17, 2004. Attempts to enact an amendment to the state Constitution to prohibit same-sex marriage, the last in 2007, were all unsuccessful.

A 1913 state law that forbade non-residents from marrying in Massachusetts if their marriage would be void in their home state was repealed on July 31, 2008.

On July 26, 2012, the SJC ruled in Elia-Warnken v. Elia that the state recognizes a civil union established in a different jurisdiction as the equivalent of marriage. It termed a Massachusetts marriage entered into by a man who was already a party to a Vermont civil union with a third party "polygamy" and therefore void. On September 28, 2012, the SJC ruled in that "Because the parties to California [registered domestic partnerships] have rights and responsibilities identical to those of marriage", it is proper to treat such relationships "as equivalent to marriage" in Massachusetts.

=== Adoption and parenting ===
In May 1985, in response to a public controversy about same-sex couple Don Babets and David Jean, who were acting as foster parents, Massachusetts issued regulations designed to prevent such couples from serving as foster parents. The state rescinded those regulations in April 1990 as part of an out-of-court settlement of a suit brought by Gay & Lesbian Advocates & Defenders (GLAD) and the American Civil Liberties Union (ACLU), following a five-year campaign by an ad hoc group formed around the issue, Foster Equality. The state has allowed second-parent adoption by a parent of the same sex as the existing parent since a court decision, In re Adoption of Tammy, in 1993. In July 1999, the same court awarded visitation rights to each of two mothers after their separation.

In 2004, following the legalization of same-sex marriage in Massachusetts, Governor Mitt Romney prevented the state's Registry of Vital Records from revising its birth certificate forms to allow for options other than one mother and one father, instead requiring hand-written changes to the documents only after receiving approval from the Governor's legal counsel. The forms were changed when Governor Deval Patrick took office in 2007.

In March 2006, Catholic Charities of Boston announced it would no longer provide adoption services because it could not comply with Massachusetts law prohibiting discrimination against homosexuals.

In February 2011, Massachusetts Health Commissioner John Auerbach announced plans by the end of March to standardize birth certificates, formerly designed by each city or town, by providing hospitals with electronic forms with fields labeled "mother/parent" and "father/parent". He called the system "more sensitive to the circumstances of the family and to the children."

On August 1, 2024, the Massachusetts General Court unanimously passed a bill to recognise and implement legal parentage from both IVF and surrogacy - regardless of marital status. The governor signed it into law on August 8, 2024 and its goes into effect on January 1, 2025.

=== City of Boston ===
In August 2023, the City of Boston removed all gender and sex on marriage licence forms and documents.

== Discrimination protections ==
Since 1989, Massachusetts has prohibited discrimination based on sexual orientation in credit, public and private employment, union practices, housing, and public accommodation. It was the second state to add sexual orientation to its anti-discrimination statute, following Wisconsin in 1982.

On February 17, 2011, Governor Deval Patrick issued an executive order banning discrimination on the part of the state or its contractors against transgender employees of the state Government. He reiterated his support for legislation to extend similar protection to all transgender persons in the state. Massachusetts enacted such legislation prohibiting discrimination based on gender identity in credit, public and private employment, union practices and housing—but not public accommodations—on November 23, 2011, effective on July 1, 2012. By the end of 2015, a bill was pending to prohibit discrimination based on gender identity in public accommodations, but its future was still uncertain. Finally, on May 12, 2016, the state Senate voted 33–4 to approve the bill. The Massachusetts House of Representatives on July 7, 2016 passed a bill by a vote of 117–36 to include gender identity to the public accommodations law. The bill was signed into law the next day, by Massachusetts Republican Governor Charlie Baker, and scheduled to take effect on October 1, 2016. In October 2016, however, anti-transgender activists submitted the minimum number of signatures necessary, to the Secretary of the Commonwealth, to put the law up for repeal on a statewide ballot measure. Voters decided on November 6, 2018 to retain the law, with 67.8% in favor of upholding law, and 32.2% opposed. The Massachusetts Gender Identity Anti-Discrimination Initiative was the first-ever statewide ballot question of its kind in the United States.

In June 2012, on instructions from Worcester's Roman Catholic Bishop Robert McManus, diocesan officials declined to sell a property owned by the diocese to a same-sex couple and in July lied about what happened when questioned about the sale. In September, the couple filed suit against the bishop and other parties to the negotiations.

On January 29, 2014, Matthew Barrett represented by GLAD filed a complaint with the Massachusetts Commission Against Discrimination against Fontbonne Academy, a Catholic secondary school, because in July 2013 the school had withdrawn an offer of employment as food service manager when officials learned he was in a same-sex marriage. The case moved to Massachusetts Superior Court, and on December 16, 2015, Judge Douglas H. Wilkins ruled in Barrett v. Fontbonne Academy that the Academy had violated the state's laws against discrimination on the basis of sexual orientation and gender.

Anti-bullying legislation was enacted in May 2010. It "requires schools to adopt clear procedures for reporting and investigating cases of bullying, as well as methods for preventing retaliation against those who report problems."

Since August 2021, the Massachusetts Supreme Judicial Court made a ruling that sexual orientation is a protective class - for picking a system of LGBTQ juries within Massachusetts.

In August 2024, a bill officially passed the Massachusetts General Court (the state Legislature) to prevent discrimination of LGBTI individuals within nursing homes. The Governor signed the bill on September 6, 2024.

== Hate crime law ==
Massachusetts added sexual orientation to the categories protected by its 1983 hate crime legislation in June 1996. The state defines a hate crime as "any criminal act coupled with overt actions motivated by bigotry and bias, including, but not limited to, a threatened, attempted or completed overt act motivated at least in part by racial, religious, ethnic, handicap, gender or sexual orientation prejudice, or which otherwise deprives another person of his constitutional rights by threats, intimidation or coercion, or which seek to interfere with or disrupt a person's exercise of constitutional rights through harassment or intimidation."

Massachusetts adopted the Hate Crimes Reporting Act in 1990. The legislation created a Crime Reporting Unit to collect hate crime incident reports from law enforcement and required the unit to summarize and report on the information. Regulations establish criteria for determining whether a crime is a hate crime, provide a means for advocacy organizations to report hate incidents, specify the content of crime and incident reports, and specify the content of the annual report. The crime report unit of the State Police must also collect, summarize and report hate crime data to the state Attorney General and to several legislative committees. The reports are available on public record.

In 1991, the Governor created the Task Force on Hate Crimes. The task force's principal tasks are (1) developing regulations to implement the Hate Crimes Reporting Act, (2) coordinating training efforts, (3) increasing submission of hate crime data, and (4) working with community organizations and victims' groups. Initiatives for 2000 include pilot programs in high schools, youth diversion programs, a new correctional diversity awareness program, outreach coordination, a victimization survey in schools, public awareness, creating civil rights investigative teams, encouragement of reporting by law enforcement, and continued training.

The term "gender identity" was added to the state's hate crime statute, effective July 1, 2012.

== Gender identity and expression ==
Massachusetts allows transgender individuals to amend their birth certificate to reflect their gender identity. Sex reassignment surgery is not a requirement.

=== Name changes ===
On November 25, 2025, Governor Maura Healey signed into law "An Act Protecting Personal Security." It keeps name changes confidential and removes the longstanding requirement for giving public notice (except when the court has a reason to order it).

=== Non-binary driver licences ===
In November 2019, it was announced that both Massachusetts I.D.s and driver licences had upgraded software by the Massachusetts RMV - to include the non-binary option of "gender X" (alongside male and female on forms and applications) effective immediately. For years bills on gender X drivers licences never passed the Massachusetts General Court - to implement these policies, so it was done by internal regulation and policy instead.

=== Non-binary birth certificates ===
In September 2021, the Massachusetts Senate passed a bill to allow gender X (alongside male and female) on an individual's birth certificate. The bill was signed into law as part of the FY25 budget on July 29, 2024. It allows for an individual to be identified with a non-binary 'X' sex designation on their birth certificate for the first time in Massachusetts history. It enshrines into law the current practice of allowing an individual to select a non-binary 'X' gender designation on their driver's license. It empowers individuals to amend the gender designation on their marriage certificate to conform with their gender identity.

=== Reaffirmed gender healthcare law ===
In July 2022, an extensive bill passed both houses of the Massachusetts General Court - that codifies "reaffirmed gender healthcare protections" embedded within Massachusetts legislation. The Governor of Massachusetts signed the bill into law. The law went into effect immediately, due to an "emergency clause" within the bill - bypassing the usual 90-day period Massachusetts laws go into effect after enactment from the Governor.

=== Intersex rights ===
In October 2020, Boston Children's Hospital announced they would stop performing clitoroplasties and vaginoplasties in intersex infants without meaningful conversation and consent from the child. This broke from decades old medical protocol which included medical and surgical intervention to alter the physical appearance of the infant's genitals but carried risks of loss of sensation, fertility issues, pain during intercourse and incontinence.

== Conversion therapy ==
In June 2018, the Massachusetts House of Representatives passed a bill by a vote of 137–14 to legally ban conversion therapy practices on minors. The bill, however, failed to pass the Massachusetts Senate before it adjourned sine die.

On March 13, 2019, the Massachusetts House of Representatives passed H140, which would ban conversion therapy on minors, by a vote of 147–8. The bill was approved by the state Senate with amendments by a vote of 34–0 on March 28, 2019. An engrossed bill was enacted on April 4, 2019, and awaited consideration by Massachusetts Governor Charlie Baker, who indicated he was "inclined to support" such legislation. The Governor signed the bill into law on April 8, 2019 and it went into effect immediately.

== Flying flag protections ==
Several Massachusetts cities, towns and localities overwhelmingly passed local ordinances and resolutions to explicitly “protect flying flags” - especially the rainbow symbol LGBTIQ+ community progress pride flag. In 2004 Massachusetts was the first US state to legalize same-sex marriage by a court.

== Public opinion and attitudes ==
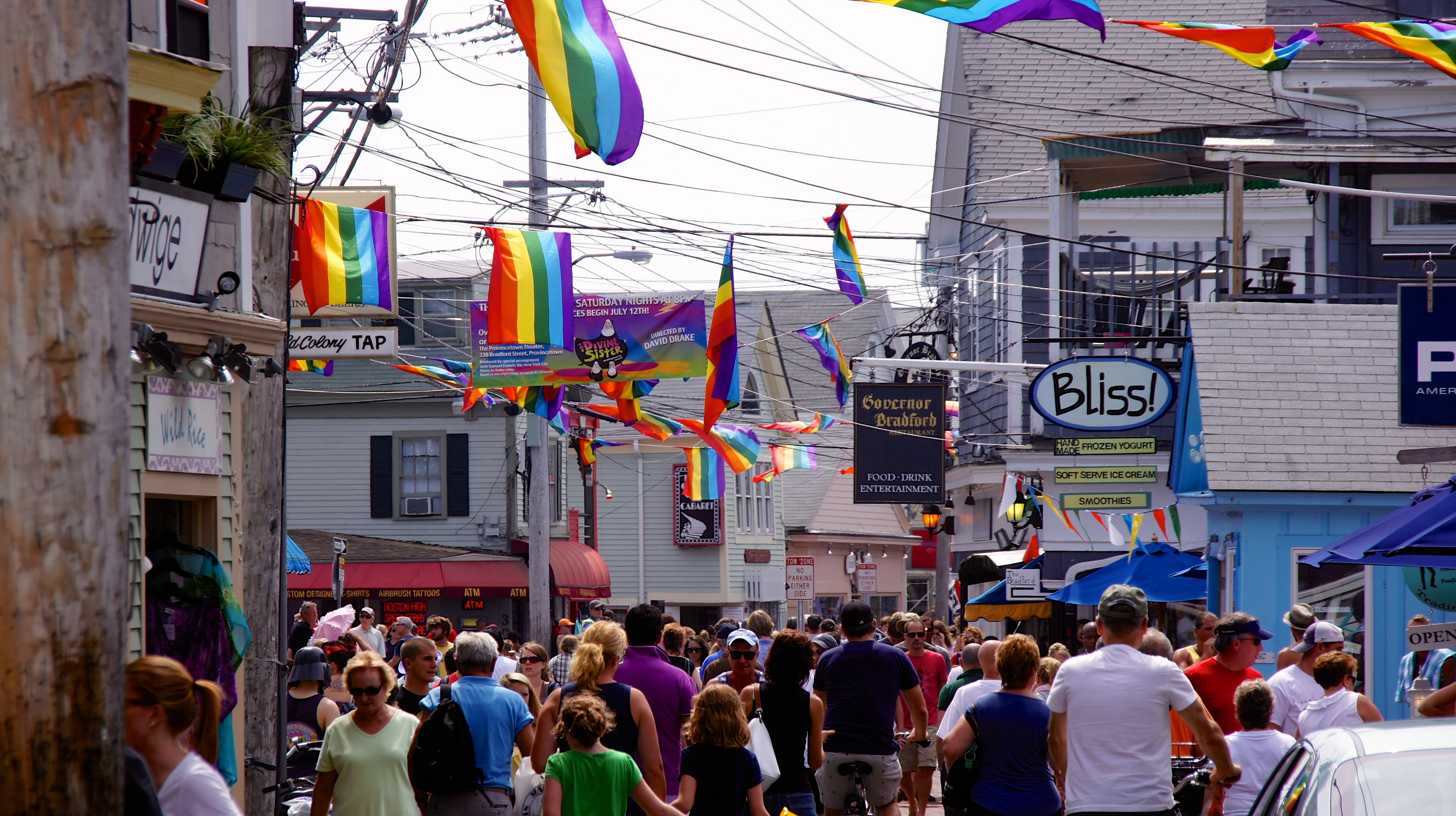
Provincetown LGBT Carnival in 2012

From the mid-2000s, opinion polls have consistently found majority support for same-sex marriage in Massachusetts.

From the mid-2010s, there has been three-quarters support. As one example, a 2017 Public Religion Research Institute (PRRI) poll found that 80% of Massachusetts residents supported same-sex marriage, 13% were opposed and 7% were undecided. At the time, this was the highest support recorded in the United States, tied with Vermont. Similarly, 80% supported anti-discrimination laws covering sexual orientation and gender identity, while 70% opposed religious-based refusals to serve LGBTQ people.

== Summary table ==
Same-sex sexual activity legal	Yes (Since 1974; statutory repeal pending)
Equal age of consent (16)	Yes
Anti-discrimination laws in all areas	Yes (Sexual orientation since 1989 and gender identity since 2016)
Same-sex marriages	Yes (Since 2004; the first in the United States)
Recognition of same-sex couples	Yes
Stepchild adoption by same-sex couples	Yes (Since 1993)
Joint adoption by same-sex couples	Yes
Lesbians, gays and bisexuals allowed to serve openly in the military	Yes (Since 2011)
Transgender people allowed to serve openly in the military	Yes / No (Most transgender personnel allowed to serve openly since 2021)
Intersex people allowed to serve openly in the military	/ Yes (Current DoD policy bans "Hermaphrodites" from serving or enlisting in the military)
Both hate crime and anti-discrimination legislation explicitly covers sexual orientation, gender identity and expression	Yes / No (Unknown if hate crime and anti-discrimination laws covers gender expression)
Right to change legal gender without surgery	Yes
Access to IVF for lesbians	Yes
Third gender option	Yes (Birth certificates starting July 1, 2024)
Legal access to single gender-neutral bathrooms	No
Gender self-identification	Yes
Abolition of the Gay and trans panic defense	No (Massachusetts Supreme Court does not recognize panic defense)
Conversion therapy banned on minors	Yes
Intersex minors protected from invasive surgical procedures	No
LGBT anti-bullying law in schools and colleges	Yes
LGBTQIA2S+ pride flag protections	No / Yes (Some cities, towns and localities since 2024)
LGBT community training required for Massachusetts law enforcement and police	No
LGBTQ-friendly curriculums within state-based schools and classrooms	No
Banning the outing of LGBT students within public schools	No
Homosexuality no longer considered a mental illness	Yes (Since 1973)
Conjugal visits for same-sex couples	No
Surrogacy access for gay male couples	Yes
MSMs allowed to donate blood	Yes (Since 2023, with conditions - such as being monogamous)

== See also ==
- Hurley v. Irish-American Gay, Lesbian, and Bisexual Group of Boston
- Politics of Massachusetts
- Law of Massachusetts
- LGBT culture in Boston
