= Joseph Tauro =

Joseph Tauro may refer to:

- G. Joseph Tauro (1906–1994), American state judge, Chief Justice of the Massachusetts Supreme Judicial Court
- Joseph L. Tauro (1931–2018), American federal judge, and G. Joseph Tauro's son
