= Paul J. Liacos =

American judge

Paul Julian Liacos

Chief Justice of the Massachusetts Supreme Judicial Court
- In office June 20, 1989 – September 30, 1996
- Preceded by: Edward F. Hennessey
- Succeeded by: Herbert P. Wilkins

Associate Justice of the Massachusetts Supreme Judicial Court
- In office 1976 – June 20, 1989
- Preceded by: Edward F. Hennessey
- Succeeded by: John Greaney

Personal details
- Born: November 20, 1929 Peabody, Massachusetts, USA
- Died: May 6, 1999 (aged 69) Boston, Massachusetts, USA
- Spouse: Maureen G. McKean (m. 1954)
- Children: 4
- Education: Boston University; Harvard University
- Military career
- Allegiance: United States
- Branch: US Air Force
- Unit: US Air Force Judge Advocate General Corps

Paul Julian Liacos (November 20, 1929 – May 6, 1999) was the chief justice of the Massachusetts Supreme Judicial Court from 1989 to 1996.

== Biography ==
He was born in Peabody, Massachusetts to James and Pitsa Liacos, Greek immigrants. His father started out in the mills of New Hampshire and the leather factories of Peabody, but eventually became the first Greek-born lawyer in Massachusetts after working his way through law school in a leather factory. Liacos had a sister, Katherine Liacos Izzo, herself a lawyer whom Governor Michael Dukakis appointed to the state Superior Court.

Liacos graduated from high school at 16, earned his undergraduate degree from Boston University in 1950, and was admitted to the bar in 1952. By the following year, he had earned a master's degree in law from Harvard University. He taught for over two decades at Boston University. For three years in the mid-1950s, he served in the US Air Force Judge Advocate General Corps. He then returned to the BU law faculty in 1957 and the family practice, Liacos & Liacos, where he spent some 25 years. In 1954, he married Maureen G. McKean, and they had three sons (James, Mark, and Gregory) and a daughter, Diana.

Liacos was still a professor when Governor Michael Dukakis named him to the Supreme Judicial Court (SJC) in 1976. He wrote a number of scholarly works, mainly in the area of criminal law, among them the definitive Handbook of Massachusetts Evidence. His written court decisions (of which there were 800) reflected a concern for individual rights – he was the court's liberal anchor and defender of civil liberties. Dukakis named him Chief Justice in 1989. During his seven years as Chief Justice, the court found that the death penalty violated the Massachusetts Constitution and broadened protections for women seeking abortions and for defendants' rights against search and seizure.

Liacos retired three years before the mandatory retirement age of 70. At the time, he said he wanted to spend more time with his family; he also wanted to give his successor, Justice Herbert P. Wilkins, an easier transition in the face of three retirements scheduled before 2000. In 1998, he was sworn in as a member of the State Ethics Commission. He died at Massachusetts General Hospital.

Legal offices
Preceded by Edward F. Hennessey	Associate Justice of the Massachusetts Supreme Judicial Court; 1976 – June 20, 1989	Succeeded by John Greaney
Preceded by Edward F. Hennessey	Chief Justice of the Massachusetts Supreme Judicial Court; June 20, 1989 – September 30, 1996	Succeeded by Herbert P. Wilkins
