= Herbert P. Wilkins =

American judge (1930–2025)

Chief Justice of the Massachusetts Supreme Judicial Court
- In office 1996 – October 13, 1999
- Nominated by: William Weld
- Preceded by: Paul J. Liacos
- Succeeded by: Margaret H. Marshall

Associate Justice of the Massachusetts Supreme Judicial Court
- In office 1972 – September 30, 1996
- Nominated by: John A. Volpe
- Preceded by: Jacob Spiegel

Personal details
- Born: January 10, 1930 Cambridge, Massachusetts, U.S.
- Died: May 27, 2025 (aged 95)
- Relations: Raymond Sanger Wilkins (father)

Herbert Putnam Wilkins (January 10, 1930 – May 27, 2025) was an American jurist who served as chief justice of the Massachusetts Supreme Judicial Court from 1996 to 1999, a position his father, Raymond Sanger Wilkins, held from 1956 to 1970.

== Life and career ==
Wilkins was born on January 10, 1930. He received his B.A. from Harvard College and his law degree from Harvard Law School. He joined the law firm of Palmer and Dodge.

He had the longest tenure of any Associate Justice of the Court (from 1972) when he was nominated Chief Judge by Governor William Weld on July 16, 1996. He retired from the Court on August 31, 1999.

After retiring from the court, Justice Wilkins taught at Boston College Law School. He died on May 27, 2025, at the age of 95.

== Notes ==
Legal offices
Preceded by Jacob Spiegel	Associate Justice of the Massachusetts Supreme Judicial Court; 1972 – 1996	Succeeded by Margaret H. Marshall
Preceded by Paul J. Liacos	Chief Justice of the Massachusetts Supreme Judicial Court; 1996 – August 31, 1999	Succeeded by Margaret H. Marshall
