= Jacob Spiegel =

American judge (1902–1984)

Jacob J. Spiegel (September 1902 – April 9, 1984) was a justice of the Massachusetts Supreme Judicial Court from 1960 to 1972. He was appointed by Governor Foster Furcolo.

== Early life, education, and career ==
Born in Boston, Massachusetts, Spiegel attended The English High School, and received his law degree from Boston University School of Law in 1922. In 1936, Spiegel worked for the Senate campaign of Henry Cabot Lodge Jr. and later became Lodge's legislative secretary.

== Judicial service ==
In 1939, Spiegel became a Special Justice of the Boston Municipal Court, appointed to that office by Governor Leverett Saltonstall.

Prior to his appointment to the state Supreme Judicial Court, Spiegel was a personal attorney to Governor Furcolo. Spiegel was the first Jewish justice to serve on the Massachusetts Supreme Judicial Court, and became known as a champion for civil rights on the court, writing decisions that "led the way against racial discrimination in housing". In one decision, he opined that "discrimination based on the hope of monetary gain and not upon a personal prejudice is ever more reprehensible". Spiegel resigned from the court upon reaching the statutory age limit.

== Personal life and death ==
In August 1941, Spiegel married Peggy Schwarz of Beverly Hills, California, whom Spiegel had met while travelling aboard the SS America the previous year. They had one child, a daughter, named Lynne Spiegel born February 28, 1949, now living in San Clemente, CA. Spiegel died in Brookline, Massachusetts, at the age of 83.

Political offices
Preceded by James Ronan	Justice of the Massachusetts Supreme Judicial Court; 1960–1972	Succeeded by Herbert P. Wilkins
