= John Spalding (Massachusetts judge) =

American judge (–1979)

John Varnum Spalding (1897 – July 16, 1979) was a justice of the Massachusetts Supreme Judicial Court from 1944 to 1971. He was appointed by Governor Leverett Saltonstall.

== Education, military service, and career ==
Born in Newton, Massachusetts, Spalding attended the public schools there, and served in the United States Army during World War I, achieving the rank of second lieutenant in the infantry. He received an undergraduate degree from Harvard University in 1920, and a J.D. from Harvard Law School in 1923. He worked in private practice until 1926, when he became Assistant United States Attorney until 1929. He then returned to private practice, and was also a lecturer at the Northeastern University School of Law, and a member of the Massachusetts judicial council.

On February 17, 1942, Governor Saltonstall appointed Spalding to a seat on the Massachusetts Superior Court, vacated by the retirement of Justice Charles Donahue. Spalding served for 27 years, until his retirement.

== Personal life and death ==
In 1930, Spalding married Jacqueline Veen of Bordeaux, France, with whom he had two children. She became "a prominent member of Boston's French community" and died in 1977.

Spalding died in Newton at the age of 81, following a lengthy illness.

Political offices
Preceded by Charles Donahue	Justice of the Massachusetts Supreme Judicial Court; 1944–1971	Succeeded by Edward F. Hennessey
