= Goodridge v. Department of Public Health =

2003 US state court case which legalized gay marriage in Massachusetts

Goodridge v. Dept. of Public Health
- Court: Massachusetts Supreme Judicial Court
- Full case name: Hillary Goodridge, Julie Goodridge, David Wilson, Robert Compton, Michael Horgan, Edward Balmelli, Maureen Brodoff, Ellen Wade, Gary Chalmers, Richard Linnell, Heidi Norton, Gina Smith, Gloria Bailey, and Linda Davies v. Massachusetts Department of Public Health and Commissioner of Public Health
- Argued: March 4, 2003
- Decided: November 18, 2003
- Citations: 440 Mass. 309, 798 N.E.2d 941 (Mass. 2003)

Case history
- Prior actions: Summary judgment granted to defendants, 14 Mass. L. Rep. 591 (Mass. Super. Ct. 2002)
- Subsequent action: none

Holding
- The denial of marriage licenses to same-sex couples violated provisions of the state constitution guaranteeing individual liberty and equality, and was not rationally related to a legitimate state interest. Superior Court of Massachusetts at Suffolk vacated and remanded.

Court membership
- Judges sitting: Margaret H. Marshall, John M. Greaney, Roderick L. Ireland, Francis X. Spina, Judith A. Cowin, Martha B. Sosman, Robert J. Cordy

Case opinions
- Majority: Marshall, joined by Greaney, Ireland, Cowin
- Concurrence: Greaney
- Dissent: Spina, joined by Sosman, Cordy
- Dissent: Sosman, joined by Spina, Cordy
- Dissent: Cordy, joined by Spina, Sosman

Laws applied
- Mass. Const. arts. 1, 6, 7, and 10, and Part II, c. 1, § 1, art. 4; Mass. Gen. Laws ch. 207

Goodridge v. Dept. of Public Health, 798 N.E.2d 941 (Mass. 2003), is a landmark Massachusetts Supreme Judicial Court case in which the Court held that the Massachusetts Constitution requires the state to legally recognize same-sex marriage. The November 18, 2003, decision was the first by a U.S. state's highest court to find that same-sex couples had the right to marry. Despite numerous attempts to delay the ruling, and to reverse it, the first marriage licenses were issued to same-sex couples on May 17, 2004, and the ruling has been in full effect since that date.

== Case ==
On April 11, 2001, Gay and Lesbian Advocates and Defenders (GLAD) sued the Massachusetts Department of Health in Superior Court on behalf of seven same-sex couples, all residents of Massachusetts, who had been denied marriage licenses in March and April 2001. All the plaintiffs had been in long-term relationships with their partners and four of the couples were raising a total of five children. The department's responsibilities included setting policies under which city and town clerks issue marriage licenses.

After holding a hearing in March 2002 at which GLAD attorney Jennifer Levi argued on behalf of the plaintiff couples, Superior Court Judge Thomas Connolly ruled in favor of the Department of Health on May 7, 2002. He wrote: "While this court understands the reasons for the plaintiffs' request to reverse the Commonwealth's centuries-old legal tradition of restricting marriage to opposite-sex couples, their request should be directed to the Legislature, not the courts.” He noted that the legislature had recently defeated same-sex marriage legislation and defended that as a rational decision rooted in the historical definition of marriage and its association with child rearing:

Recognizing that procreation is marriage's central purpose, it is rational for the legislature to limit marriage to opposite-sex couples who, theoretically, are capable of procreation. Moreover, because same-sex couples are unable to procreate on their own and therefore must rely on inherently more cumbersome means of having children, it is also rational to assume that same-sex couples are less likely to have children or, at least, to have as many children as opposite-sex couples.

The plaintiffs appealed directly to the Supreme Judicial Court (SJC), which heard arguments on March 4, 2003. Mary Bonauto of GLAD argued the case for the plaintiffs. Assistant Attorney General Judith Yogman represented the DPH.

Massachusetts Attorney General Tom Reilly argued in his brief that the Court should defer to the legislature's judgment of "the broader public interest" and recognize that "same-sex couples cannot procreate on their own and therefore cannot accomplish the 'main object' ... of marriage as historically understood."

Amicus briefs were submitted on behalf of the Boston Bar Association, the Massachusetts Bar Association, the Urban League of Eastern Massachusetts, the Massachusetts Family Institute, the National Association for Research and Therapy of Homosexuality, The Common Good Foundation, the Massachusetts Citizens Alliance, the Catholic Action League of Massachusetts, The National Legal Foundation, the Marriage Law Project, the Religious Coalition for the Freedom to Marry, the Ethics & Religious Liberty Commission, Coalition gaie et lesbienne du Québec, the Free Market Foundation, the Massachusetts Psychiatric Society, Agudath Israel of America, several Attorneys General (including those of Nebraska, Utah, and South Dakota), and a variety of individuals.

== Decision ==
On November 18, 2003, the Court decided, by a vote of 4–3, that excluding same-sex couples from marriage is unconstitutional. The Massachusetts Supreme Judicial Court said it was asked to determine whether Massachusetts "may deny the protections, benefits and obligations conferred by civil marriage to two individuals of the same sex who wish to marry." The court continued "We conclude that it may not. The Massachusetts Constitution affirms the dignity and equality of all individuals. It forbids the creation of second-class citizens." The plaintiffs had asked the Court to say that denying marriage licenses to same-sex couples violated Massachusetts law. Instead the opinion said: "We declare that barring an individual from the protections, benefits, and obligations of civil marriage solely because that person would marry a person of the same sex violates the Massachusetts Constitution."

The court stayed the implementation of its ruling for 180 days to allow the state legislature to "take such action as it may deem appropriate in light of this opinion." Reactions included speculation that the legislature could follow Vermont's example and enact civil unions in that time period, but state Senate President Robert Travaglini said he thought that "the strength of the language and the depth of the decision" showed that marriage and no substitute "is the wish of the court." Arthur Miller, a Harvard law professor, said he thought the legislature might exploit the Court's 4–3 division to get it to accept a status much like marriage under another name.

=== Majority opinion ===
Chief Justice Margaret Marshall wrote the majority opinion, in which justices Roderick L. Ireland, Judith A. Cowin, and John M. Greaney joined. Although the arguments and the decision turned entirely on questions of state law, she cited in her discussion of the Court's duty the U.S. Supreme Court's decision the previous June in Lawrence v. Texas that invalidated sodomy laws: "Our concern is with the Massachusetts Constitution as a charter of governance for every person properly within its reach. 'Our obligation is to define the liberty of all, not to mandate our own moral code.'" She rejected the plaintiffs' contention that the state's marriage licensing law, which mentions marriage but never the gender of the parties, could be interpreted to permit same-sex marriages. The lack of a definition, she wrote, shows the legislature meant marriage in "the term's common-law and quotidian meaning".

Turning to whether the state's denial of marriage rights to same-sex couples violated the state constitution's guarantee of equal protection and due process, she noted that "The Massachusetts Constitution protects matters of personal liberty against government incursion as zealously, and often more so, than does the Federal Constitution, even where both Constitutions employ essentially the same language." Discussing the proper standard for review, she found that the Court did not need to consider whether the plaintiffs' claims merited strict scrutiny, a more thorough than usual standard of review, because the state's marriage policy did not meet the most basic standard of review, rational basis.

She then considered and dismissed the three rationales the DPH offered for its marriage licensing policy: "(1) providing a 'favorable setting for procreation'; (2) ensuring the optimal setting for child rearing, which the department defines as 'a two-parent family with one parent of each sex'; and (3) preserving scarce State and private financial resources." The first, she wrote, incorrectly posits that the state privileges "procreative heterosexual intercourse between married people". Rather "Fertility is not a condition of marriage, nor is it grounds for divorce. People who have never consummated their marriage, and never plan to, may be and stay married." The misconception that "'marriage is procreation'", she wrote, "confers an official stamp of approval on the destructive stereotype that same-sex relationships are inherently unstable and inferior to opposite-sex relationships and are not worthy of respect." The second, the marriage of a man and a woman as the "optimal setting for child rearing", a claim she said many Massachusetts statutes and the notion of "the best interests of the child" refuted, she found irrelevant, in that denying marriage licenses to one class of persons does not affect the marriage patterns of the other class. She turned the argument against the DPH: "the task of child rearing for same-sex couples is made infinitely harder by their status as outliers to the marriage laws." She concluded that "It cannot be rational under our laws, and indeed it is not permitted, to penalize children by depriving them of State benefits because the State disapproves of their parents' sexual orientation." She dismissed the third rationale as an unjustified generalization about the economic interdependence of same-sex partners. Later in the opinion she summarized this analysis, saying the DPH's arguments were "starkly at odds with the comprehensive network of vigorous, gender-neutral laws promoting stable families and the best interests of children."

Addressing the concerns expressed in various amicus briefs about the potential harm same-sex marriage might cause to the institution of marriage, she wrote:

Here, the plaintiffs seek only to be married, not to undermine the institution of civil marriage. They do not want marriage abolished. They do not attack the binary nature of marriage, the consanguinity provisions, or any of the other gate-keeping provisions of the marriage licensing law. Recognizing the right of an individual to marry a person of the same sex will not diminish the validity or dignity of opposite-sex marriage, any more than recognizing the right of an individual to marry a person of a different race devalues the marriage of a person who marries someone of her own race. If anything, extending civil marriage to same-sex couples reinforces the importance of marriage to individuals and communities. That same-sex couples are willing to embrace marriage's solemn obligations of exclusivity, mutual support, and commitment to one another is a testament to the enduring place of marriage in our laws and in the human spirit.

She then reviewed the history of constitutional law as one of "'the story of the extension of constitutional rights and protections to people once ignored or excluded'", quoting the U.S. Supreme Court once more, United States v. Virginia. She reviewed several examples related to marriage, including married women acquiring legal status apart from their husbands, the invalidation of anti-miscegenation laws, and no-fault divorce. As for creating conflict with the laws of other states, she wrote:

We would not presume to dictate how another State should respond to today's decision. But neither should considerations of comity prevent us from according Massachusetts residents the full measure of protection available under the Massachusetts Constitution. The genius of our Federal system is that each State's Constitution has vitality specific to its own traditions, and that, subject to the minimum requirements of the Fourteenth Amendment, each State is free to address difficult issues of individual liberty in the manner its own Constitution demands.

She summarized the Court's decision:

The marriage ban works a deep and scarring hardship on a very real segment of the community for no rational reason. The absence of any reasonable relationship between, on the one hand, an absolute disqualification of same-sex couples who wish to enter into civil marriage and, on the other, protection of public health, safety, or general welfare, suggests that the marriage restriction is rooted in persistent prejudices against persons who are (or who are believed to be) homosexual ... Limiting the protections, benefits, and obligations of civil marriage to opposite-sex couples violates the basic premises of individual liberty and equality under law protected by the Massachusetts Constitution.

Considering what relief to grant the plaintiffs, she noted that the Court of Appeal for Ontario had "refined common-law meaning of marriage" and then provided the Court's meaning: "We construe civil marriage to mean the voluntary union of two persons as spouses, to the exclusion of all others." The legislature retained its "broad discretion to regulate marriage".

=== Concurrence ===
Justice John M. Greaney authored a concurring opinion in which he said he shared much of Marshall's analysis, but viewed the denial of marriage licenses to same-sex couples as sex discrimination: "The marriage statutes prohibit some applicants, such as the plaintiffs, from obtaining a marriage license, and that prohibition is based solely on the applicants' gender." Since, in his view, "constitutional protections extend to individuals and not to categories of people", Massachusetts is not discriminating on the basis of sexual orientation but restricting a person's choice of spouse on the basis of gender, a classification he found the state had not justified.

=== Dissenting opinions ===
Justices Robert J. Cordy, Francis X. Spina, and Martha Sosman filed separate dissents from the Court's ruling.

Justice Cordy stated that "the Legislature could rationally conclude that it furthers the legitimate State purpose of ensuring, promoting, and supporting an optimal social structure for the bearing and raising of children." He continued that "this case is not about government intrusions into matters of personal liberty," but "about whether the State must endorse and support [the choices of same-sex couples] by changing the institution of civil marriage to make its benefits, obligations, and responsibilities applicable to them."

Justice Spina wrote that "[W]hat is at stake in this case is not the unequal treatment of individuals or whether individuals rights have been impermissibly burdened, but the power of the Legislature to effectuate social change without interference from the courts, pursuant to art. 30 of the Massachusetts Declaration of Rights." He wrote that the "power to regulate marriage lies with the Legislature, not with the judiciary."

Justice Sosman noted that "[p]eople are of course at liberty to raise their children in various family structures, so long as they are not literally harming their children by doing so. But that does not mean that the State is required to provide identical forms of encouragement, endorsement, and support to all of the infinite variety of household structures that a free society permits." She went on to argue that "[a]bsent consensus on the issue, or unanimity amongst scientists studying the issue, or a more prolonged period of observation of this new family structure, it is rational for the Legislature to postpone any redefinition of marriage that would include same-sex couples until such time as it is certain that redefinition will not have unintended and undesirable social consequences." She concluded that "[a]s a matter of social history, [the majority] opinion may represent a great turning point that many will hail as a tremendous step toward a more just society. As a matter of constitutional jurisprudence, however, the case stands as an aberration."

== Reaction and first same-sex weddings ==
Alan Wolfe, professor of political science at Boston College reacted to the decision with a prediction: "This comes pretty close to an earthquake politically. I think it's exactly the right kind of material for a backlash." Justice Roderick L. Ireland, who voted with the majority, reported receiving threats against his life following the decision. In his January 20 State of the Union address, President George W. Bush alluded to events in Massachusetts: "Activist judges ... have begun redefining marriage by court order, without regard for the will of the people and their elected representatives. On an issue of such great consequence, the people's voice must be heard. If judges insist on forcing their arbitrary will upon the people, the only alternative left to the people would be the constitutional process. Our Nation must defend the sanctity of marriage."

A poll of Massachusetts residents taken on November 19–20 found that 50 percent supported the decision, 38 percent opposed it, and 11 percent had no opinion; 53 percent opposed the proposed constitutional amendment and 36 percent supported it; 53 percent thought the legislature should do nothing more than modify state law to conform with the SJC opinion, while 16 percent wanted the governor and legislators to resist the ruling's implementation and 23 percent wanted them to provide benefits to same-sex couples while reserving marriage to different-sex couples.

The SJC had stayed implementation of its ruling for 180 days in order to allow the legislature to respond as it found necessary. On December 11, 2003, the State Senate asked the SJC whether establishing civil unions for same-sex couples would meet the ruling's requirements. The SJC replied on February 4, 2004, that civil unions would not suffice to satisfy its finding in Goodridge. The 4 justices who formed the majority in the Goodridge decision wrote: "The dissimilitude between the terms 'civil marriage' and 'civil union' is not innocuous; it is a considered choice of language that reflects a demonstrable assigning of same-sex, largely homosexual, couples to second-class status." They continued: "For no rational reason the marriage laws of the Commonwealth discriminate against a defined class; no amount of tinkering with language will eradicate that stain."

Republican Governor Mitt Romney responded to the SJC's February 2004 statement that civil unions were an insufficient response to its ruling in Goodridge with a statement supporting an amendment to the Massachusetts state constitution to overrule the court's decision. His statement said, "the people of Massachusetts should not be excluded from a decision as fundamental to our society as the definition of marriage." On February 24, President Bush for the first time endorsed a Federal Marriage Amendment to the U.S. Constitution that would define marriage as the union of a man and a woman but allow the states the option of creating other legal arrangements for same-sex couples. Same-sex marriage took on national importance as public officials in several jurisdictions allowed more than 7,000 same-sex couples to wed, including San Francisco (February 12 – March 11); Sandoval County, New Mexico (February 20); New Paltz, New York (February 27); Multnomah County, Oregon (March 3); and Asbury Park, New Jersey (March 8).

The legislature took no action either to implement Goodridge or block its implementation before the state began issuing marriage licenses to same-sex couples on May 17, 2004. News coverage of that day's events in Massachusetts was extensive, though limited outside the United States. The three major networks led their evening news shows with wedding coverage and it was lead story in the Washington Post and the New York Times.

However, despite being acknowledged as the first U.S. state supreme court ruling to officially legalize gay marriage, Goodridge would not be the first time a U.S. state supreme court made such a ruling which found that excluding same-sex couples from marriage was discriminatory, with the Hawaii Supreme Court also previously making a similar ruling in 1993.

== Lawsuits and proposed constitutional amendments ==
Opponents of the decision asked federal courts to overrule the decision. A suit filed by a conservative nonprofit organization, Liberty Counsel, on behalf of the Catholic Action League and eleven members of the legislature argued that the Supreme Judicial Court had deprived the people of Massachusetts of their right to a "Republican Form of Government" as guaranteed by Article IV of the U.S. Constitution when it refused to stay its decision to allow for a referendum to amend the state constitution. In May 2004, U.S. District Court Judge Joseph Tauro denied their request for an injunction delaying implementation of the decision, as did the First Circuit Court of Appeals in June. The Supreme Court declined to hear the case without comment in November. Other opponents of same-sex marriage formed VoteOnMarriage.org to promote the adoption of an amendment to the state constitution banning same-sex marriage.

On June 17, 2004, GLAAD filed another suit on behalf of eight same-sex couples with ties to Massachusetts, but not residents of the state. It challenged a 1913 law that denied marriage licenses to anyone whose marriage would not be valid in their state of residence. On March 30, 2006, the Supreme Judicial Court upheld the law's application to marriages of same-sex couples in Cote-Whitacre v. Department of Public Health, though the decision was complicated by uncertainty about the recognition of same-sex marriages in New York and Rhode Island. The law was repealed on July 31, 2008.

Opponents of same-sex marriage sought to reverse the Goodridge decision by amending the state constitution, an extended process in Massachusetts requiring repeated approval by the legislature before being put to a popular vote. They used each of the two methods the Massachusetts Constitution provides. First, legislators devised their own compromise language that banned same-sex marriage and permitted civil unions with the proviso that same-sex civil unions would not qualify as marriages for federal purposes. That proposed amendment needed to be approved by a majority vote in two successive joint sessions of the legislature, but after passing the first time it failed the second time on September 14, 2005, when the compromise collapsed. Second, opponents of same-sex marriage proposed language defining marriage as the union of a man and a woman, making no reference to civil unions. By gathering enough signatures on petitions, their amendment required a vote of just 25% of the legislators in two successive joint sessions of the legislature. This amendment received the necessary votes the first time, but failed the second time when 45 legislators voted for the amendment and 151 against it on June 14, 2007.

== Impact ==
More than 10,000 same-sex couples married in Massachusetts in the first four years after such marriages became legal on May 17, 2004. Approximately 6,100 marriages took place in the first six months, and they continued at a rate of about 1,000 per year.

On the fifth anniversary of the Goodridge decision, Mary Bonauto, who argued the case for GLAD, said that state agencies were cooperating fully with its requirements, noting that exceptions occurred in programs that received federal funding and were therefore subject to the restrictions of the U.S. Defense of Marriage Act (DOMA).

As of June 2015, same-sex marriages were made federally legal across the U.S. when the Supreme Court ruled in Obergefell v. Hodges that state bans of same-sex marriage were unconstitutional.

In the years following the Goodridge decision, some wedding celebrations have used passages from it. For example:

Civil marriage is at once a deeply personal commitment to another human being and a highly public celebration of the ideals of mutuality, companionship, intimacy, fidelity, and family. Because it fulfills yearnings for security, safe haven, and connection that express our common humanity, civil marriage is an esteemed institution, and the decision whether and whom to marry is among life's momentous acts of self-definition.

== Plaintiffs ==
The plaintiffs were Gloria Bailey and Linda Davies; Maureen Brodoff and Ellen Wade; Hillary Goodridge and Julie Goodridge; Gary Chalmers and Richard Linnell; Heidi Norton and Gina Smith; Michael Horgan and Edward Balmelli; and David Wilson and Robert Compton. Julie and Hillary Goodridge married on May 17, 2004, the first day the state issued marriage licenses to same-sex couples, as did the other six plaintiff couples. The Goodridges separated amicably in July 2006 and divorced in July 2009.

== See also ==
- Same-sex marriage in Massachusetts
- LGBT rights in Massachusetts

State court decisions

- Baker v. Vermont, 744 A.2d 864 (Vt. 1999)
- Lewis v. Harris, 188 N.J. 415 (2006)
- Kerrigan v. Commissioner of Public Health, 289 Conn. 135 (2008)
- In re Marriage Cases, 43 Cal.4th 757 (2008)
- Varnum v. Brien, 763 N.W.2d 862 (Iowa 2009)
