= Massachusetts 1913 law =

Massachusetts General Laws Chapter 207, Section 11, more commonly known as the 1913 law, is a Massachusetts law enacted in 1913 and repealed in 2008 that invalidated the marriage of non-residents if the marriage was invalid in the state where they lived. It originated during a period of heightened antipathy to interracial marriage and went largely unenforced until used between 2004 and 2008 to deny marriage licenses to out-of-state same-sex couples.

== Enactment ==
State Senator Harry Ney Stearns introduced Senate Bill 234 on March 7, 1913. The bill was signed into law three weeks later by Governor Eugene N. Foss. The statute provided that in the Commonwealth of Massachusetts:

Section 11. No marriage shall be contracted in this commonwealth by a party residing and intending to continue to reside in another jurisdiction if such marriage would be void if contracted in such other jurisdiction, and every marriage contracted in this commonwealth in violation hereof shall be null and void. Mass. Gen. L. ch. 207, § 11 (2005).

No record of the state Senate debate has been found. Historians and legal scholars have said that the original purpose of the legislation was an anti-miscegenation measure. The law did not ban interracial marriage, which had been legal in Massachusetts since 1843, but blocked interracial couples from states that banned interracial marriages from marrying in Massachusetts. The law was enacted at the height of a public scandal over black heavyweight boxer Jack Johnson's interracial marriages. A 1912 conference on uniform state laws recommended the language adopted by Massachusetts because, among other things, it would enforce state prohibitions against the marriage of "a white person and a colored person." At a conference of governors in 1912 during the height of the publicity surrounding Johnson's marriages, Governor Foss of Massachusetts was one of several northern governors who endorsed the enactment of an anti-miscegenation statute. Vermont passed a similar statute about the same time as Massachusetts.

In 1912, prompted by the notoriety of Johnson's marriages, a Congressman from Georgia, Seaborn Roddenbery, proposed an anti-miscegenation amendment to the U.S. Constitution in the U.S. House of Representatives. It provided that "Intermarriage between negros or persons of color and Caucasians ... within the United States ... is forever prohibited." That amendment failed to pass, but the U.S. House did pass legislation making interracial marriage a crime in the District of Columbia. As of 1910, 60 percent of states – 28 of the 46 – had anti-miscegenation laws. Anti-miscegenation measures were introduced in 9 states in 1913 and enacted in one of them, Wyoming.

== Legal challenges ==
Following the Supreme Judicial Court's (SJC) decision in Goodridge v. Department of Public Health (2003) as the May 17, 2004, date set for the legalization of same-sex marriage in Massachusetts approached, the state Department of Public Health (DPH) altered its marriage license form, Notice of Intention of Marriage, to ask applicants where they intended to reside once married, citing the 1913 law in the form's instructions to clerks. Even before the first same-sex marriages occurred, the 1913 was a focus of debate and national press coverage. Governor Romney took the position that "Massachusetts should not become the Las Vegas of same-sex marriage".

Clerks in some localities, including Somerville, Worcester and Provincetown, ignored the DPH instructions and granted marriage licenses to same-sex couples that the 1913 law excluded, prompting Governor Romney to call for stricter enforcement and for those marriages not to be registered on the state's public health records. His position was that same-sex couples were only entitled to licenses if they intended to reside in Massachusetts. He said: "What next, is Provincetown going to start marrying 10-year-olds in violation of the law. ... Are they going to refuse to enforce the drug laws? Will they ignore the gun laws, too?" Attorney General Tom Reilly ordered the clerks to follow the guidelines issued by the Department of Public Health.

GLAD, an LGBT advocacy group, initiated a lawsuit on June 17, 2004, Cote-Whitacre v. Department of Public Health, on behalf of eight same-sex couples from other states—Connecticut, Maine, New Hampshire, New York, Rhode Island, and Vermont—and by several Massachusetts city and town clerks who argued that they were being turned into "agents of selective enforcement." The challengers argued that the 1913 law violates the equal protection provisions of the state constitution and the United States Constitution, and that the state's enforcement of the statute for the first time in decades demonstrated its animus against same-sex couples. Reilly's brief for the state said the 1913 law was "an important tool in avoiding a national backlash" against same-sex marriage and help forestall the adoption of a federal constitutional amendment banning same-sex marriage, a measure Romney supported and which the U.S. Senate was scheduled to debate the week the case was heard. He disputed the importance of race in the enactment of the 1913 law as well. Massachusetts Superior Court Justice Carol Ball ruled on August 18 that the law was not unconstitutional, since it was applied equally to all couples without respect to sexual orientation.

On March 30, 2006, the Supreme Judicial Court upheld the law as it applies to marriages of same-sex couples who plan to reside in states that expressly prohibit same-sex marriage. Three justices thought all the plaintiffs' claims failed, no matter their intended state of residence; three thought they failed in the cases of states that expressly prohibited same-sex marriage, but not in all states; Justice Roderick L. Ireland would have found for the plaintiffs. The decision denied the claims of the clerks and all the couples except those living in New York and Rhode Island. It sent those cases back to the superior court so it could consider whether those states might recognize the validity of a same-sex marriage established elsewhere, since their constitutions and statutes had no express prohibition of same-sex marriage. Justice Francis X. Spina, writing for the majority, said that "The laws of this commonwealth have not endowed nonresidents with an unfettered right to marry. To the contrary, the rights of nonresidents to marry in Massachusetts have been specifically restricted." He recognized that application of the 1913 law "has inevitably fallen disproportionately on nonresident same-sex couples rather than on nonresident opposite-sex couples" but said that Goodridge "does not now compel a conclusion that nonresident same-sex couples, who have no intention of living in Massachusetts, have an identical right to secure a marriage license that they could not otherwise obtain in their home states." Romney commented: "This is an important victory for traditional marriage and for the right to each state to be sovereign as it defines marriage. It would have been wrong for this court to impose its same sex ruling on the other 49 states of America."

On September 29, 2006, Superior Court Justice Thomas E. Connolly determined that same-sex couples who reside in Rhode Island can marry in Massachusetts after finding "that same-sex marriage is ... not prohibited in Rhode Island".

== Repeal ==
In April 2004, as the dispute over using the law to prevent out-of-state same-sex couples from marrying was developing, a state representative filed a bill to repeal it. Two state senators, hoping to speed the legislative process, proposed adding a repeal amendment to the annual budget measure under consideration in May. The state Senate first backed the repeal of the 1913 law on May 19 as part of that budget measure, voting 28 to 3 just two days after same-sex marriage became legal in the state. The provision was dropped from the legislation when considered by the House, where Speaker Thomas Finneran, an opponent of same-sex marriage, controlled the legislative agenda.

Following the 2006 SJC decision upholding the law, State Senator Jarrett Barrios introduced a measure to repeal the 1913 statute in 2007, but the legislature's consideration of the statute's repeal was set aside during the battle over a referendum. Then activity in other states provided an additional impetus for repeal. On May 14 New York Governor David Paterson ordered state agencies to recognize same-sex marriages from other jurisdictions. On May 15 the California Supreme Court invalidated the state's ban on same-sex marriage, and the state began issuing marriage licenses to same-sex couples on June 17, including nonresidents. The Massachusetts legislature took up Barrios' legislation in July, and the prospects for repeal were initially uncertain, though Governor Deval Patrick and the leaders of both houses of the legislature expressed support for repeal.

The state's four Roman Catholic bishops asked the legislators not to change the law, as did the Massachusetts Family Institute (MFI). Advocates of repeal made a variety of arguments. Referencing the statute's origins, one senator said: "This is a very simple law, contrived in shame, and it exists in shame, and we ought to wipe it off the books". Another said that "People have become resigned to the fact that all the chaos that was predicted in 2004—the sky was going to fall, it would be catastrophic—it never happened." Others cited the economic advantages of hosting out-of-state weddings, especially those of New Yorkers whose marriages would likely be recognized by that state. On July 15, 2008, the Massachusetts State Senate voted to repeal the 1913 law on a unanimous voice vote.

The house debated the measure on July 29. One representative predicted chaos in other states if the law was repealed and another warned that repeal might allow non-residents too young to marry in their state of residence to exploit the fact that Massachusetts allows minors with parental consent and court approval to marry. Other legislators noted that same-sex couples who married in Massachusetts and moved to other states were already forcing those states to confront their legal status. The House voted the same day to repeal the 1913 law on a vote of 118 to 35. Advocates of same-sex marriage rights in New York praised the vote. "Now New Yorkers can drive across the border to a neighboring state and get a marriage license that will be recognized as legal and valid here at home," said a spokesman for the Empire State Pride Agenda, an LGBT advocacy organization. Governor Patrick signed the bill into law on July 31, 2008. The repeal took effect immediately. The statute's repeal made the state the second to allow gay and lesbian couples to marry regardless of their place of residence, as California had begun doing in June. Mathew Staver, dean of the Liberty University School of Law, said: "The door has been opened to export same-sex marriage to other parts of the country. This takes the dam away from the border holding back same-sex marriage in Massachusetts and releases it across the country." A staff attorney at GLAD predicted few lawsuits and said: "States are going to have to sort this out over time, but there's nothing about same-sex couples that creates a new paradigm." Governor Patrick said: "I think other states will make their own judgments, and I expect them to–that's their own business. All we can do is tend our own garden, and make sure that it's weeded, and I think we've weeded out a discriminatory law that we should have."

== Proposed referendum ==
In October 2008, MassResistance, an organization opposed to gay and lesbian rights, attempted to reinstate the law by referendum, but failed to collect sufficient signatures on petitions to qualify for the November 2010 ballot. The organization submitted approximately 10,500 of the required 33,297 signatures by the October 29, 2008 deadline. The Massachusetts Family Institute and the Catholic Church, both prominent opponents of same-sex marriage and the repeal of the 1913 law, did not support the petition drive. In an email message to its supporters, MassResistance wrote that "Many people were afraid that if they signed, their names would end up on homosexual web sites and they would be harassed." It also said that Catholic churches had been ordered not to allow signatures to be collected, that "priests spoke from the pulpit against it," and that the MFI was "afraid that if we forced a statewide election, it would be too difficult a fight and they wanted to avoid that."

== See also ==
- 134th Massachusetts General Court (1913)
