= Raymond Sanger Wilkins =

American judge (c. 1891–1971)

Chief Justice of the Massachusetts Supreme Judicial Court
- In office September 13, 1956 – September 1, 1970

Personal details
- Born: May 24, 1891
- Died: May 12, 1971 (aged 79)
- Relations: Herbert P. Wilkins (son)
- Education: Harvard College (BA); Harvard Law School (LLB)
- Occupation: jurist

Raymond Sanger Wilkins (May 24, 1891 – May 12, 1971) was a justice of the Massachusetts Supreme Judicial Court from 1944 to 1970, serving as chief justice after 1956. He was appointed by Governor Christian Herter. He graduated from Harvard College in 1912, and Harvard Law School in 1915.

Wilkins served as an officer in the United States Army during World War I, in the 76th Infantry Division in France. There, he achieved the rank of captain.

== Personal life and death ==
Wilkins was married three times, first to Mary Louisa Aldrich of Fall River, Massachusetts, in 1923, with whom he had two sons. Mary died in 1954, and in 1956 Wilkins married Katharine Schuyler Crosby, who died in 1959. Wilkins finally married Georgie Hebbard, who was the "widow of a close friend", in 1965. One of his sons, Herbert P. Wilkins, was also a future Chief Justice of the Massachusetts Supreme Judicial Court.

Wilkins died in Winchester, Massachusetts, at the age of 79.

Political offices
Preceded by Louis Cox	Justice of the Massachusetts Supreme Judicial Court; 1944–1970	Succeeded by G. Joseph Tauro
