= Edward F. Hennessey =

American judge (1919–2007)

Chief Justice of the Massachusetts Supreme Judicial Court
- In office 1976 – April 19, 1989
- Preceded by: G. Joseph Tauro
- Succeeded by: Paul J. Liacos

Associate Justice of the Massachusetts Supreme Judicial Court
- In office 1971–1976
- Preceded by: John Spalding
- Succeeded by: Paul J. Liacos

Personal details
- Born: Edward Francis Hennessey; April 20, 1919 Boston, Massachusetts, U.S.
- Died: March 8, 2007 (aged 87) Needham, Massachusetts, U.S.
- Party: Republican
- Spouse: Elizabeth A. O'Toole (m. 1945)
- Children: 1
- Education: Northeastern University
- Occupation: Judge

Military service
- Allegiance: United States
- Branch/service: United States Army
- Rank: Captain
- Battles/wars: World War II
- Awards: Bronze Star Medal; Purple Heart

Edward Francis Hennessey (April 20, 1919 – March 8, 2007) was the chief justice of the Massachusetts Supreme Judicial Court from 1976 to 1989.

== Biography ==
Born in South Boston, he moved with his family to Newton at age 6. His mother worked in a factory, his father stoked boilers. He was the first in his family to attend college, working his way through Northeastern University, from which he graduated in 1941.

== Military service ==
He served in the United States Army during World War II (in the Mediterranean theater) and was a captain, receiving a Bronze Star and a Purple Heart. A shortage of lawyers prompted the Army to assign some who had not attended law school to prosecute and defend soldiers during court martial proceedings. Hennessey was among the appointed attorneys and he was fascinated by the work. His first case was to defend a man charged with rape; the man was found guilty of a lesser crime. After the war, he went to Boston University School of Law, graduating with honors in 1949.

== Marriage and family ==
Meanwhile, he married Elizabeth A. O'Toole, whom he had met in the sixth grade. They were engaged before he left for the war and married in October 1945, the month he returned. The couple had one daughter, Beth A. Hennessey, a professor at Wellesley College as of 2007.

== Law career ==
He made his mark as a civil litigator, a trial lawyer in civil cases, many of them as a defense lawyer in personal injury cases. He also gained recognition as a law school lecturer and legal scholar, writing law review articles, editing the Massachusetts Law Quarterly and co-authoring a text on the practice of automobile law.

During the 1950s and early 1960s, he practiced civil and criminal law and was an assistant Middlesex district attorney. In 1967, Governor John A. Volpe appointed him to the state Superior Court. Four years later, Governor Francis W. Sargent elevated Hennessey to the Supreme Judicial Court, where he served as an associate justice until Governor Michael Dukakis chose him to be chief justice in 1975.

A centrist Republican, he once observed, "When justice requires, I'm a liberal. When justice requires, I'm a conservative."

== Writing ==
He wrote prolifically; one of his more notable opinions came with the court's 1980 ruling that the state's death penalty, signed into law less than a year earlier, was unconstitutional because it was "unacceptable under contemporary standards in its unique and inherent capacity to inflict pain" and that it discriminated against minorities, "particularly blacks." He wrote, "We reject any suggestion that racial discrimination is confined to the South or to any other geographical area." He was generally anti-abortion as well.

== Retirement and death ==
He retired at the mandatory age of 70. His health declined sharply during his last year and he died in a nursing home in Needham, where he had lived for many years.

Legal offices
Preceded by John Spalding	Associate Justice of the Massachusetts Supreme Judicial Court; 1971–1976	Succeeded by Paul J. Liacos
Preceded by G. Joseph Tauro	Chief Justice of the Massachusetts Supreme Judicial Court; 1976 – April 19, 1989	Succeeded by Paul J. Liacos
