= Knowthyneighbor.org =

KnowThyNeighbor.com
- Website type: Nonprofit
- Owner: KnowThyNeighbor.org
- Website: www.KnowThyNeighbor.org
- Commercial: No
- Registration: No
- Launched: 2005

KnowThyNeighbor.org is a non-profit grass roots coalition co-founded in September 2005 by Tom Lang and Aaron Toleos for the purpose of publishing a fully searchable list of the names of people who signed the petition to end same sex marriage in Massachusetts that was sponsored by VoteOnMarriage.org. Knowthyneighbor.org was the first lesbian, gay, bisexual, transgender (LGBT) group to pioneer this type of activism.

== Activities ==
Petition fraud was accused when petition signature gatherer Angela McElroy came forward and testified that she and others engaged in deliberate voter fraud at the direction of her employer. After its inception in Massachusetts KTN listed on its website the petitions to take away GLBT rights in other states such as Oregon, Arkansas, and Florida, posting the Florida and Arkansas petitions but not the signatures in Oregon where the signature collection effort failed. KnowThyNeighbor.org's efforts in Arkansas led to exposing the signature of Walmart CEO Mike Duke as one of the people who signed the petition to put an anti-gay adoption ban on the ballot in Arkansas.

KnowThyNeighbor.org has also been active at rallies in and around the Boston area as early as the Liberty Sunday protest rally on October 17, 2006. KnowThyNeighbor.org continues to be active advocating for LGBT rights by lobbying legislators and through the website's blog.

== Controversy ==
According to The Boston Globe in 2006, the campaign has attracted controversy and opponents are reported as saying that "its real purpose is to intimidate". Similarly, in 2009 in The Seattle Times, Larry Stickney of the group Protect Marriage Washington reportedly accused the homosexual lobby of adopting "hostile, undemocratic, intimidating tactics". Also in 2009 Associated Press reported via abc40 news that the Arkansas Family Council may ask lawmakers to block the release of this information on the grounds that it violated the rights to privacy of those who signed the petitions.

Group's efforts combined with Washington state based group resulted in the United States Supreme Court ruling Doe v. Reed 8-1 in their favor, effectively defeating their adversary's argument that the group's activities of posting the identity of petition signatures constitutes intimidation against those who would sign.
