= Barrett v. Fontbonne Academy =

Barrett v. Fontbonne Academy is a Massachusetts Superior Court decision of December 16, 2015, that found that a Roman Catholic secondary school violated the state's laws against discrimination on the basis of both sexual orientation and gender when it withdrew an offer of employment from a candidate when officials learned he was in a civil same-sex marriage. It was the first decision in the United States since the nationwide legalization of same-sex marriage accomplished by the U.S. Supreme Court decision in Obergefell v. Hodges the previous June to consider the competing claims of discrimination in employment and the protections afforded religious institutions.

== Background ==
On January 29, 2014, Matthew Barrett represented by GLAD filed a complaint with the Massachusetts Commission Against Discrimination against Fontbonne Academy, a Catholic secondary school in Milton, Massachusetts, because in July 2013 the school withdrew an offer of employment as food service manager when officials learned he was in a same-sex marriage. After accepting the job offer, Barrett completed paperwork and provided as his emergency contact the name Ed Suplee, whom he identified as his husband. A few days later the school withdrew its offer of employment and explained that his status as a spouse in a same-sex marriage was inconsistent with the teaching of the Roman Catholic Church.

The facts of the case were not in dispute. A spokesperson for the school said it "does not discriminate based on sexual orientation, but that church doctrine against same-sex marriage drives policy at Fontbonne, and other Catholic schools." The Academy is an all-girls college preparatory school sponsored by the Sisters of St. Joseph of Boston.

Some negative reaction from alumnae of Fontbonne Academy, on social media and in comments on news articles, was directed at the school, though some blamed the Church rather than the school.

In September 2014, Boston Cardinal Sean O'Malley was asked how to reconcile the Church's outreach to gays and lesbians with the number of LGBT-related employment disputes in the news. He replied that the situation "needs to be rectified".

== Decision ==
The case moved to Massachusetts Superior Court in May 2014. On December 16, 2015, Judge Douglas H. Wilkins ruled in Barrett v. Fontbonne Academy that the Academy had violated the state's laws against discrimination on the basis of sexual orientation and gender.

The court identified two types of discrimination. It held that Barrett suffered discriminated on the basis of sexual orientation because basing the school's action on his marriage is not distinct from basing it on his sexual orientation. It also found gender-based discrimination, because "he was denied employment for marrying a person whom a female could have married without suffering the same consequences".

The court then weighed the Academy's claims that it qualified for exemption under the statutes, first examining certain contradictory language in the relevant statutes. It said that the legislature allowed only a very narrow exemption for religious institutions as employers and that because the Academy admits non-Catholic students–"including Muslims, Jews, Baptists, Buddhists, Hindus and Episcopalians"–it failed to meet the law's strict test for exemption as an enterprise that "limits membership, enrollment, admission, or participation to members of that religion". The school requires only administrators and the theology faculty to be Catholics. The Academy had argued that requiring it to employ Barrett violated its federal Constitutional right to "expressive association", but the court found that Barrett's employment as food service manager would not significantly burden the school's ability to communicate its message or "dilute that message, given Barrett's only assertion in conflict with the school's message had occurred when completing a form and that in the position he sought to fill he would not be engaged in the school's mission of "presenting the gospel values or the ... teachings of the Catholic Church". The court also pointed to public awareness of the issue:

The widespread public awareness of the civil laws allowing same-sex marriage and prohibiting employment discrimination, coupled with Fontbonne's ability to explain its position without interference in the form of advocacy from Barrett, leaves little risk that Fontbonne's involuntary compliance with civil law will be mistaken for endorsement of same-sex marriage.

Finally, the court considered the Academy's claim that it merited an exception from the anti-discrimination statutes based on the "ministerial exception" established under both the federal and state constitutions that prevents government interference in the free exercise of religion, specifically interference in a religious group's selection of its ministers, teachers and those who exercise religious functions. The Academy asserted that each of its employees is a "minister of the mission". The court found under U.S. Supreme Court precedent that more was required to meet the "ministerial exception" than such an assertion alone.

== Reaction ==
The decision received national news coverage, and much of the response broke down along the lines established in the debate over same-sex marriage.

Andrew Beckwith, president of the Massachusetts Family Institute, commented: "This court decision makes it impossible for faith-based institutions to survive....If this decision stands, it will either force faith-based schools to close their doors to anyone who is not of the same religion or they will have to give up their beliefs and hire without any regard to faith which will ultimately cease to make them faith-based institutions". Gregory S. Baylor, senior counsel at the Alliance Defending Freedom, said: "You are on a slippery slope if you allow the government to determine which jobs it deems 'religious. The government should not be allowed to interfere with a religious school's hiring practices and what it believes is important to remain true to its mission and identity. Religious schools should be able to have representatives that behave in a manner that is consistent with their beliefs so that there is no misunderstanding where the school stands on controversial issues."

Denise Donohue, deputy director of K-12 education programs for the Cardinal Newman Society, said students need a consistent message: "Hiring individuals who are not on mission, whether they are a classroom teacher, librarian or grounds keeper, weakens Catholic identity and undermines the mission of the school."

Barrett's attorney, Bennett Klein of GLAD, said: "Marriage equality has been the law of Massachusetts for over a decade, and it is now the law of the land. But you can't have equality if you can get married on Saturday and fired on Monday." He noted that the decision meant that the school is liable for damages for lost wages as well as compensatory damages for discrimination. He wrote in a press release: "Religiously affiliated organizations do not get a free pass to discriminate against gay and lesbian people. When Fontbonne fired Matt from a job that has nothing to do with religion, and simply because he is married, they came down on the wrong side of the law."

Dwight G. Duncan, professor of law at the University of Massachusetts School of Law, called the decision "pretty solid, from a strictly legal point of view." He noted the impact of the case was uncertain given the differences in the exemptions afforded religious institutions as employers under Massachusetts law and under federal a law.

== Settlement ==
Barrett's attorneys announced on May 9, 2016, that he had reached a confidential settlement with the school, which would not pursue an appeal. It included a financial payment, but details were not disclosed. The school issued a statement that said: "Fontbonne Academy expresses deep gratitude to Mr. Barrett for his willingness to come together with us in a spirit of conciliation, and wishes him well as the school moves ahead in its mission to foster educational excellence and social justice in an open and inclusive community".
