= VoteOnMarriage.org =

Political organization opposed to same-sex marriage

VoteOnMarriage.org was a U.S. political organization in the state of Massachusetts dedicated to the passage of a constitutional amendment to the Massachusetts Constitution to ban same-sex marriage. Its goal was to have the amendment voted on by the people of Massachusetts in the 2008 general election, but the amendment failed when it was defeated by a joint session of the Massachusetts Legislature.

== Overview ==
Led by evangelical preacher Roberto S. Miranda and Kris Mineau, the group was successful in getting the Massachusetts Legislature to vote on a proposed ban on future same sex marriages. The Massachusetts Constitution requires 50 affirmative votes (25%) at two consecutive Constitutional Conventions of the legislature, and the initial vote for the ban was 62 in favor. The second vote was defeated with 45 members voting in favor, so the issue was not included on 2008 ballot and same-sex marriage remained legal in Massachusetts.

== Mission ==
VoteOnMarriage.org stated that its Massachusetts Protection of Marriage Amendment would permit Massachusetts citizens to vote on the definition of marriage and that "Marriage as the union of a man and a woman is the universal model and predates all nations, religions and laws. The heterosexual marital relationship reflects the fundamental essence of laws of nature and anatomy, and ensures procreation and the nurturing of children." The organization supported a Benefits Fairness Act that would allow some benefits for two adults in a dependent relationship who were ineligible for marriage.

== Controversy ==
VoteOnMarriage.org was accused of employing forgery and bait-and-switch techniques to obtain fraudulent signatures for their petition drive, and the Massachusetts Attorney General initiated a criminal investigation regarding the forgery allegations. The group Knowthyneighbor.org published a searchable online database listing names and addresses of the petition signers, allowing signatures to be checked for fraud and complaints to be reported.

On January 9, 2006, shortly after a news report of a paid signature gatherer alleging to the media she defrauded citizens, VoteOnMarriage.org sent a letter to the Secretary of State of Massachusetts asking his office to investigate the matter. The letter stated that VoteOnMarriage.org sought to comply fully with all applicable laws during the signature gathering process and had been found in full compliance by the Attorney General. The letter also raised concerns about the legitimacy of the petition complaint reporting processes established by Knowthyneighbor.org.

The deadline period for filing complaints with the Election’s Division of the Secretary of the Commonwealth’s office related to the petition process was January 6, 2006. No formal challenges to the VoteOnMarriage.org signature-gathering effort were filed.

== Prospects ==
According to a March, 2005 poll conducted by The Boston Globe, 56% of voters in Massachusetts supported the State's Supreme Judicial Court and its ruling in Goodridge v. Dept. of Public Health, while only 37% opposed the ruling.

VoteOnMarriage.org cited a poll conducted by the State House News Service in Massachusetts finding that 75% of registered voters believed that the people, not the courts, should decide the definition of marriage in Massachusetts.

On June 14, 2007, the most recent effort to enable a constitutional amendment banning same-sex marriage failed, and no active effort to do so continues.
