= G. Joseph Tauro =

American judge (1906–1994)

Chief Justice of the Massachusetts Supreme Judicial Court
- In office 1970–1976
- Preceded by: Raymond Sanger Wilkins
- Succeeded by: Edward F. Hennessey

Associate Justice of the Massachusetts Supreme Judicial Court
- In office 1961–1970

Personal details
- Born: January 10, 1906 Lynn, Massachusetts, U.S.
- Died: October 6, 1994 (aged 88) Salem Hospital, Salem, Massachusetts, U.S.
- Spouse: Helen M. Petrossi
- Children: Joseph L. Tauro
- Education: Boston University; Boston University School of Law
- Profession: Attorney, judge

G. Joseph Tauro (January 10, 1906 – October 6, 1994) was the chief justice of the Massachusetts Supreme Judicial Court from 1970 to 1976.

== Biography ==
Tauro was born in Lynn, Massachusetts to an Italian immigrant cobbler and his wife. He graduated from Lynn public schools and attended Boston University's College of Business Administration for a year before switching to its law school. He received his law degree in 1927. Admitted to the bar that year, he practiced in Lynn until 1961, when he became an associate Superior Court justice.

Tauro's 1961 appointment was made by his longtime friend and business associate, Governor John A. Volpe. A practicing attorney in Lynn, Tauro had for many years been general counsel and a director for Volpe Construction Co. At the time of his appointment to a judgeship, he was the newly elected governor's legal counsel at the State House. The next year, Judge Tauro became chief justice of the Superior Court.

A short, compact man with dark brown eyes, a brush mustache, and wavy, snow white hair, he was noted during his years on the bench for his competence, courtesy, diligence, and preparation.

Aware of the caseloads crushing Supreme Judicial Court (SJC) justices, he had advocated establishment of an intermediate appellate court to permit the high court to concentrate on cases of broad social impact. Within two years of his 1970 appointment by Governor Francis W. Sargent to the position of Chief Justice, Judge Tauro brought the project to fruition and the Appeals Court was established. He also worked to modernize state civil law and he wrote many decisions now considered landmarks in a variety of fields - contracts, torts, real property, corporations, governmental regulations and environmental protection.

Tauro was the first Italian American and Roman Catholic to hold the position of Chief Justice of the SJC.

During his fourteen years on the bench, he made more than one landmark decision, including one that effectively abolished the death penalty in Massachusetts. "The state should not be in the business of taking lives," he said.

The only person to serve as chief justice of both the Supreme Judicial Court and the Superior Court, he also became, upon his retirement in 1976, the first Chief Justice in the Supreme Judicial Court's long history to retire at age 70 in accordance with the 98th Amendment to the Massachusetts Constitution, adopted in 1972.

A resident of Swampscott, he died at Salem Hospital. He was survived by his wife of 64 years, Helen M. (née Petrossi); a son, Judge Joseph Louis Tauro; two brothers, Arthur L. and Raymond; and a sister, Celia Tricca. He is predeceased by his brother Dr. Antonio Tauro and his sister Carol A. Gioacchini.

Legal offices
Preceded by Raymond Sanger Wilkins	Chief Justice of the Massachusetts Supreme Judicial Court; 1970 – 1976	Succeeded by Edward F. Hennessey
