= John Greaney =

American judge (born 1939)

John M. Greaney

Associate Justice Massachusetts Supreme Judicial Court
- In office 1989–2008
- Preceded by: Paul J. Liacos
- Succeeded by: Ralph Gants

Chief Justice of the Massachusetts Appeals Court
- In office 1984–1989

Personal details
- Born: April 8, 1939 (age 87) Westfield, Massachusetts, U.S.
- Education: College of the Holy Cross (BA); New York University (LLB)

John Michael Greaney (born April 8, 1939) is an American jurist who served as an associate justice of the Massachusetts Supreme Judicial Court from 1989 to 2008. He was previously the chief justice of the Massachusetts Appeals Court from 1984 to 1989.

== Early life and education ==
Greaney was born on April 8, 1939, in Westfield, Massachusetts. He graduated from St. Mary's High School in Westfield.

Greaney graduated from the College of the Holy Cross in Worcester, Massachusetts, with a Bachelor of Arts, summa cum laude, as valedictorian in 1960. As an undergraduate at Holy Cross, he was awarded the John E. Wickham Gold Medal, given to the highest-ranking student in the graduating class. He then earned his Juris Doctor (J.D.) from the New York University School of Law as a Root-Tilden scholar in 1963. As a law student, he served as the chairman of the journal Annual Survey of American Law.

== Career ==
After briefly serving in the military, Chief Justice Greaney joined the Springfield law firm of Ely and King until his appointment to the Hampden County Housing Court in 1974.

Greaney served as presiding judge in the Housing Court until Governor Michael Dukakis appointed him to the Superior Court in 1975, then to the Appeals Court in 1978. He served as an associate justice until 1984, when he became the Appeals Court's chief justice. In 1989, Greaney was appointed to the Supreme Judicial Court, where he served until his retirement in 2008. In his time on the bench, he wrote a well-known concurrence in Goodridge v. Department of Public Health. In 2008, Justice Greaney retired from the court and was appointed director of the Macaronis Institute for Trial and Appellate Advocacy at Suffolk University Law School in Boston.

Legal offices
Preceded by Paul J. Liacos	Associate Justice of the Massachusetts Supreme Judicial Court; 1998-2008	Succeeded by Ralph Gants
