= Roderick L. Ireland =

American judge (born 1944)

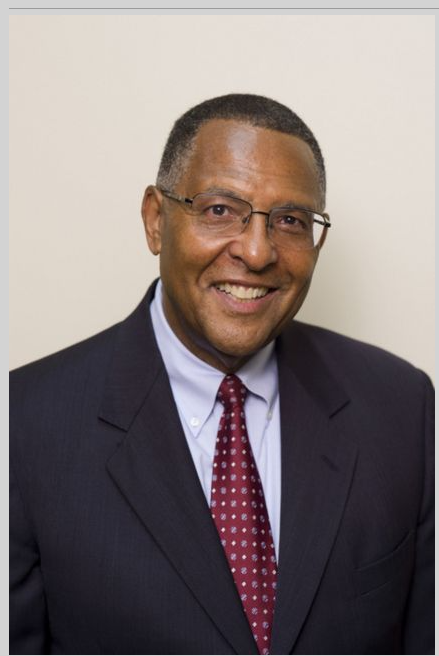

Roderick L. Ireland (born December 3, 1944) served as the 36th Chief Justice of the Supreme Judicial Court of Massachusetts, and was the first African American to serve that position. He was nominated for Chief Justice by Governor Deval Patrick on November 4, 2010, and sworn in on December 20. He retired from service on the court on July 25, 2014.

== Early life and education ==
Ireland was born on December 3, 1944, in Springfield, Massachusetts to Helen Garner Ireland, an elementary school teacher from Spartanburg, South Carolina, and George Lovelace Ireland, a house painter from Springfield. He grew up on Terrence Street in the Old Hill neighborhood, and attended Springfield public schools – The William N. DeBerry Elementary School, Buckingham Junior High School, and Classical High School. He received his B.A. from Lincoln University, the first degree-granting HBCU in the nation (1966); J.D. from Columbia Law School (1969); LL.M. from Harvard Law School (1975); and Ph.D. in Law, Policy and Society from Northeastern University (1998).

== Roxbury Defenders Committee ==
In 1971, alongside Wallace Sherwood, Ireland formed the Roxbury Defenders Committee (also known as the Roxbury Defenders).

== Judicial career ==
In 1977, Ireland was nominated to the Boston Juvenile Court, and in 1990, to the Massachusetts Court of Appeals. He was appointed to both courts by governor Michael Dukakis.

In 1997, he was appointed Associate Justice of the Massachusetts Supreme Judicial Court by Governor William Weld. He is the first African-American associate justice and also the first African-American chief justice of the Massachusetts Supreme Court. He resigned from the high court in 2014, and was replaced by Associate Justice Ralph Gants.

Ireland has served on the faculty of both Northeastern University School of Law and Northeastern University's College of Criminal Justice. He is currently Distinguished Professor of Criminology and Criminal Justice in the College of Social Sciences and Humanities at Northeastern University.

== Personal life ==
Ireland is married to Alice Alexander. The now adult children from their previous marriages are Elizabeth and Michael (Ireland's daughter and son), and Melanee (Alexander's daughter). Ireland is a member of the Elliot Congregational Church in Roxbury, Massachusetts.

== Honors ==
=== Renamings ===
In 2015, the city of Springfield, Massachusetts renamed the street Ireland grew up on, Terence Street, to Chief Justice Roderick L. Ireland Way in honor of Ireland.

In 2017, the Hampden County Hall of Justice was renamed the Roderick L. Ireland Courthouse in honor of Ireland.

=== Honorary Degrees ===
Ireland has received honorary degrees from Excelsior College, University of Massachusetts Boston

== Books ==
He is the author of Massachusetts Juvenile Law, a volume of the Massachusetts Practice Series.

== See also ==
- List of African-American jurists
