= Government of Massachusetts =

State government of the United States

- Great Seal of the Commonwealth of Massachusetts
- Polity type: Presidential republic Federated state
- Constitution: Constitution of Massachusetts

Legislative branch
- Name: General Court
- Type: Bicameral
- Meeting place: Massachusetts State House
- Upper house
- Name: Senate
- Presiding officer: Karen Spilka, President
- Lower house
- Name: House of Representatives
- Presiding officer: Ronald Mariano, Speaker

Executive branch
- Head of state and government
- Title: Governor
- Currently: Maura Healey
- Appointer: Election
- Cabinet
- Name: 9 Executive Agencies
- Leader: Governor
- Deputy leader: Lieutenant Governor
- Headquarters: State House

Judicial branch
- Name: Judiciary of Massachusetts
- Courts: Courts of Massachusetts
- Massachusetts Supreme Judicial Court
- Chief judge: Kimberly S. Budd
- Seat: Suffolk County Courthouse, Boston

The Commonwealth of Massachusetts is governed by a set of political tenets laid down in its state constitution. Legislative power is held by the bicameral General Court, which is composed of the Senate and House of Representatives. The governor exercises executive power with other independently elected officers: the Attorney General, Secretary of the Commonwealth, and Auditor. The state's judicial power rests in the Supreme Judicial Court, which manages its court system. Cities and towns act through local governmental bodies to the extent that they are authorized by the Commonwealth on local issues, including limited home-rule authority. Although most county governments were abolished during the 1990s and 2000s, a handful remain.

Massachusetts' capital city is Boston. The seat of power is in Beacon Hill, home of the legislative and executive branches. The Supreme Judicial Court is in nearby Pemberton Hill.

== Federal government ==
=== Congressional delegation ===
For Congressional representation outlined in the United States Constitution, Massachusetts elects two senators to the Senate, as well as a number of Representatives to the House of Representatives proportional to the state's population in the US Census. From the 2010 Census, Massachusetts has nine representatives. As of the 2020 election, all these officials have been from the Democratic Party. This makes the Massachusetts federal delegation the largest single-party federal delegation in the United States.

Congressional delegation of Massachusetts
Chamber	District	Official	Party	Term began	Term expires
Senate	At-Large	Elizabeth Warren	Democratic	2013	2031
Senate	At-Large	Ed Markey	Democratic	2013	2027
House of Representatives	1st	Richard Neal (Dean)	Democratic	1989	2027
House of Representatives	2nd	Jim McGovern	Democratic	1997	2027
House of Representatives	3rd	Lori Trahan	Democratic	2019	2027
House of Representatives	4th	Jake Auchincloss	Democratic	2021	2027
House of Representatives	5th	Katherine Clark	Democratic	2013	2027
House of Representatives	6th	Seth Moulton	Democratic	2015	2027
House of Representatives	7th	Ayanna Pressley	Democratic	2019	2027
House of Representatives	8th	Stephen Lynch	Democratic	2001	2027
House of Representatives	9th	Bill Keating	Democratic	2011	2027

=== Federal courts ===
For federal court cases the State falls within the United States District Court for the District of Massachusetts and appeals to the United States Court of Appeals for the First Circuit.

=== Electoral College ===
Massachusetts has 11 votes in the electoral college for election of the President, which are given on a winner-take-all basis. The state joined the National Popular Vote Interstate Compact in 2009, though the Compact has not yet achieved sufficient national support to be activated.

== Executive ==
Massachusetts has 151 departments or agencies and over 700 independent boards and commissions. The head of the state's Executive Branch is by law the Governor, but it also has two types of executive officials that do not fall in the Governor's control. Constitutional officers are the elected officials specified by the state constitution, while independent agencies are created by statute and the governor exercises only indirect control through appointments.

=== Constitutional officers ===
Constitutional officers
Incumbent	Office	Status	Ex officio	Departments	Took office
Officers
Her Excellency; Maura Healey (born 1971)	Governor	Head of state Head of government	Cabinet; Governor's Council; Commander-in-chief of the National Guard	Office of Constituent Services; Office of Federal-State Relations	5 January 2023 (3 years ago)
Her Honor; Kim Driscoll (born 1966)	Lieutenant Governor	Deputy officer	Cabinet; Chair of the Governor's Council	Office of Constituent Services; Office of Federal-State Relations	5 January 2023 (3 years ago)
His Honor; William F. Galvin (born 1950)	Secretary of the Commonwealth	Chief administrator Keeper of the Seal; Registrar of deeds Records officer Chief Elections Officer	Head of the Massachusetts Archives; Chair of the Massachusetts Historical Commission	Registry of Deeds; Office of Campaign and Political Finance; Division of Elections; Public Records Division	1 January 1995 (31 years ago)
The Honorable; Andrea Campbell (born 1982)	Attorney General	Chief legal officer	—	The Energy and Environment Bureau; The Government Bureau; The Health Care and Fair Competition Bureau; The Public Protection and Advocacy Bureau	18 January 2023 (3 years ago)
The Honorable; Deb Goldberg (born 1954)	Treasurer and Receiver-General	Treasurer	Chair of the Massachusetts School Building Authority; Chair of the Massachusetts Lottery; Chair of the State Board of Retirement	Alcoholic Beverages Control Commission; Unclaimed Property Division; Veterans' Bonus Division; Massachusetts Clean Water Trust	21 January 2015 (11 years ago)
The Honorable; Diana DiZoglio (born 1983)	State Auditor	Auditor general	—	Bureau of Special Investigations; Division of Audit Operations; Division of Local Mandates; Municipal Finance Oversight Board	18 January 2023 (3 years ago)

==== Governor's Council ====
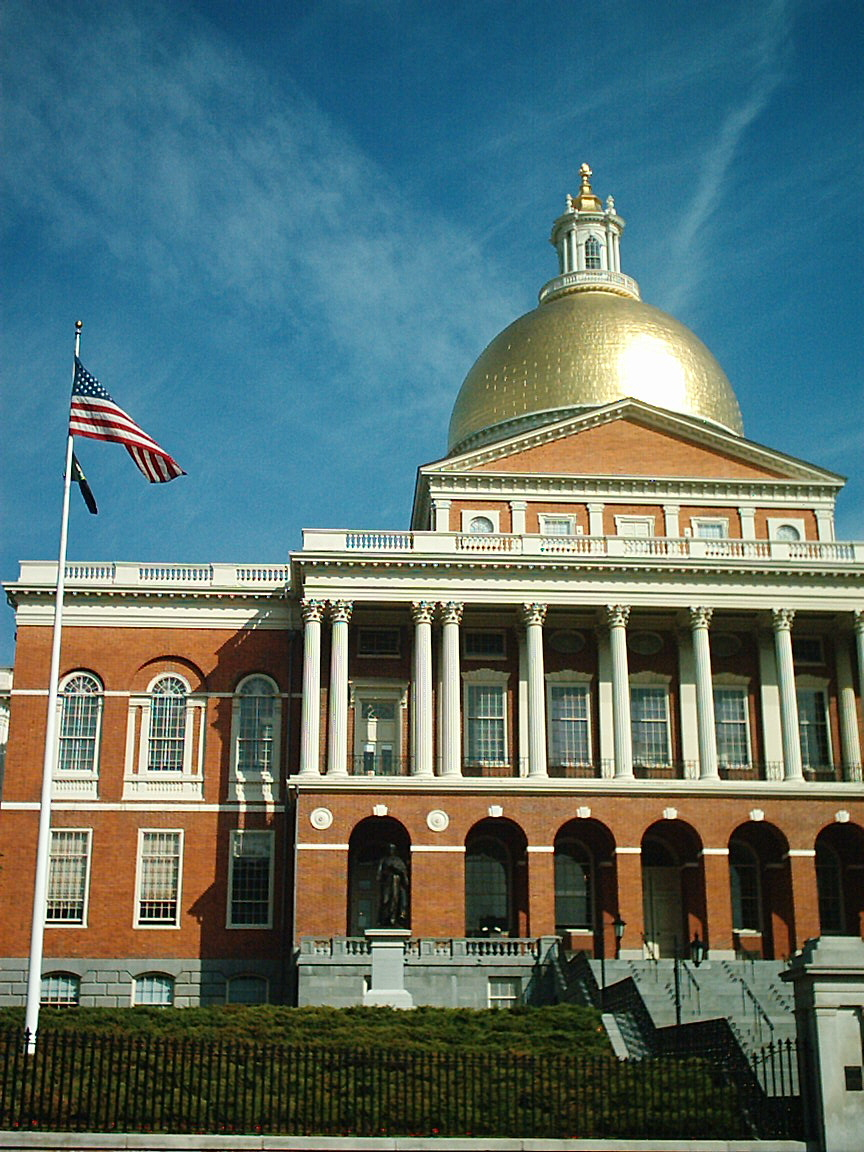
Massachusetts State House in Boston

The Governor's Council consists of eight councilors elected from districts every two years, as well as the lieutenant governor. The council provides for advice and consent for judicial appointments, appointment of certain public officials including notaries public and justices of the peace, pardons and commutations, and certain payments from the state treasury. The governor is the nonvoting president of the council, but is chaired by the Lieutenant Governor in their absence.

Massachusetts Governor's Council
District	Councilor	Party
Chairperson, at-large	Kim Driscoll	Democrat
District 1	Joseph Ferreira	Democrat
District 2	Vacant	--
District 3	Marilyn M. Petitto Devaney	Democrat
District 4	Christopher A. Iannella	Democrat
District 5	Eileen R. Duff	Democrat
District 6	Terrence W. Kennedy	Democrat
District 7	Paul DePalo	Democrat
District 8	Tara J. Jacobs	Democrat

- District attorneys and Sheriffs - Independently elected by district

Some executive agencies are tasked by the legislature with formulating regulations by following a prescribed procedure. Most of these are collected in the Code of Massachusetts Regulations.

=== Cabinet and government agencies ===
The governor has a cabinet of eleven secretaries. They supervise the state agencies, which are under the direct control of the governor. Nine of the secretaries preside over the executive office of their respective areas.

Executive departments of Massachusetts
Office	Secretary	Departments	Website
Executive Office of Administration and Finance	Matthew Gorzkowicz	Appellate Tax Board	https://www.mass.gov/orgs/executive-office-for-administration-and-finance
Executive Office of Administration and Finance	Matthew Gorzkowicz	Bureau of the State House	https://www.mass.gov/orgs/executive-office-for-administration-and-finance
Executive Office of Administration and Finance	Matthew Gorzkowicz	Civil Service Commission	https://www.mass.gov/orgs/executive-office-for-administration-and-finance
Executive Office of Administration and Finance	Matthew Gorzkowicz	Department of Revenue	https://www.mass.gov/orgs/executive-office-for-administration-and-finance
Executive Office of Administration and Finance	Matthew Gorzkowicz	Developmental Disabilities Council	https://www.mass.gov/orgs/executive-office-for-administration-and-finance
Executive Office of Administration and Finance	Matthew Gorzkowicz	Division of Administrative Law Appeals	https://www.mass.gov/orgs/executive-office-for-administration-and-finance
Executive Office of Administration and Finance	Matthew Gorzkowicz	Division of Capital Asset Management	https://www.mass.gov/orgs/executive-office-for-administration-and-finance
Executive Office of Administration and Finance	Matthew Gorzkowicz	State Library	https://www.mass.gov/orgs/executive-office-for-administration-and-finance
Executive Office of Administration and Finance	Matthew Gorzkowicz	Group Insurance Commission	https://www.mass.gov/orgs/executive-office-for-administration-and-finance
Executive Office of Administration and Finance	Matthew Gorzkowicz	Healthy Policy Commission	https://www.mass.gov/orgs/executive-office-for-administration-and-finance
Executive Office of Administration and Finance	Matthew Gorzkowicz	Health Resources Division	https://www.mass.gov/orgs/executive-office-for-administration-and-finance
Executive Office of Administration and Finance	Matthew Gorzkowicz	Office on Disability	https://www.mass.gov/orgs/executive-office-for-administration-and-finance
Executive Office of Administration and Finance	Matthew Gorzkowicz	Operational Services Division	https://www.mass.gov/orgs/executive-office-for-administration-and-finance
Executive Office of Administration and Finance	Matthew Gorzkowicz	Public Employee Retirement Administration Commission	https://www.mass.gov/orgs/executive-office-for-administration-and-finance
Executive Office of Administration and Finance	Matthew Gorzkowicz	Teacher's Retirement Board	https://www.mass.gov/orgs/executive-office-for-administration-and-finance
Executive Office of Energy and Environmental Affairs	Rebecca Tepper	Department of Agricultural Resources	https://www.mass.gov/orgs/executive-office-of-energy-and-environmental-affairs
Executive Office of Energy and Environmental Affairs	Rebecca Tepper	Department of Conservation and Recreation	https://www.mass.gov/orgs/executive-office-of-energy-and-environmental-affairs
Executive Office of Energy and Environmental Affairs	Rebecca Tepper	Department of Energy Resources	https://www.mass.gov/orgs/executive-office-of-energy-and-environmental-affairs
Executive Office of Energy and Environmental Affairs	Rebecca Tepper	Department of Environmental Protection	https://www.mass.gov/orgs/executive-office-of-energy-and-environmental-affairs
Executive Office of Energy and Environmental Affairs	Rebecca Tepper	Department of Fish and Game	https://www.mass.gov/orgs/executive-office-of-energy-and-environmental-affairs
Executive Office of Energy and Environmental Affairs	Rebecca Tepper	Department of Public Utilities	https://www.mass.gov/orgs/executive-office-of-energy-and-environmental-affairs
Executive Office of Energy and Environmental Affairs	Rebecca Tepper	State Reclamation Board	https://www.mass.gov/orgs/executive-office-of-energy-and-environmental-affairs
Executive Office of Energy and Environmental Affairs	Rebecca Tepper	Environmental Police	https://www.mass.gov/orgs/executive-office-of-energy-and-environmental-affairs
Executive Office of Energy and Environmental Affairs	Rebecca Tepper	Massachusetts Office of Technical Assistance	https://www.mass.gov/orgs/executive-office-of-energy-and-environmental-affairs
Executive Office of Health and Human Services	Kiame Mahaniah	Massachusetts Department of Children and Families	https://www.mass.gov/orgs/executive-office-of-health-and-human-services
Executive Office of Health and Human Services	Kiame Mahaniah	Department of Developmental Services	https://www.mass.gov/orgs/executive-office-of-health-and-human-services
Executive Office of Health and Human Services	Kiame Mahaniah	Department of Elder Affairs	https://www.mass.gov/orgs/executive-office-of-health-and-human-services
Executive Office of Health and Human Services	Kiame Mahaniah	Department of Mental Health	https://www.mass.gov/orgs/executive-office-of-health-and-human-services
Executive Office of Health and Human Services	Kiame Mahaniah	Department of Public Health	https://www.mass.gov/orgs/executive-office-of-health-and-human-services
Executive Office of Health and Human Services	Kiame Mahaniah	Department of Transitional Assistance	https://www.mass.gov/orgs/executive-office-of-health-and-human-services
Executive Office of Health and Human Services	Kiame Mahaniah	Department of Veterans' Services	https://www.mass.gov/orgs/executive-office-of-health-and-human-services
Executive Office of Health and Human Services	Kiame Mahaniah	Department of Youth Services	https://www.mass.gov/orgs/executive-office-of-health-and-human-services
Executive Office of Health and Human Services	Kiame Mahaniah	Department of Public Health	https://www.mass.gov/orgs/executive-office-of-health-and-human-services
Executive Office of Health and Human Services	Kiame Mahaniah	Office of Refugees and Immigrants	https://www.mass.gov/orgs/executive-office-of-health-and-human-services
Executive Office of Health and Human Services	Kiame Mahaniah	Commission for the Blind	https://www.mass.gov/orgs/executive-office-of-health-and-human-services
Executive Office of Health and Human Services	Kiame Mahaniah	Commission for the Deaf and Hard of Hearing	https://www.mass.gov/orgs/executive-office-of-health-and-human-services
Executive Office of Health and Human Services	Kiame Mahaniah	Rehabilitation Commission	https://www.mass.gov/orgs/executive-office-of-health-and-human-services
Executive Office of Health and Human Services	Kiame Mahaniah	MassHealth	https://www.mass.gov/orgs/executive-office-of-health-and-human-services
Executive Office of Health and Human Services	Kiame Mahaniah	Soldiers Homes in Chelsea and Holyoke	https://www.mass.gov/orgs/executive-office-of-health-and-human-services
Executive Office of Economic Development	Eric Paley	Consumers Affairs and Business Regulation	https://www.mass.gov/orgs/executive-office-of-economic-development
Executive Office of Economic Development	Eric Paley	Department of Business Development	https://www.mass.gov/orgs/executive-office-of-economic-development
Executive Office of Economic Development	Eric Paley	Department of Telecommunications and Cable	https://www.mass.gov/orgs/executive-office-of-economic-development
Executive Office of Economic Development	Eric Paley	Division of Banks	https://www.mass.gov/orgs/executive-office-of-economic-development
Executive Office of Economic Development	Eric Paley	Division of Insurance	https://www.mass.gov/orgs/executive-office-of-economic-development
Executive Office of Economic Development	Eric Paley	Division of Professional Licensure	https://www.mass.gov/orgs/executive-office-of-economic-development
Executive Office of Economic Development	Eric Paley	Division of Standards	https://www.mass.gov/orgs/executive-office-of-economic-development
Executive Office of Economic Development	Eric Paley	Massachusetts Marketing Partnership	https://www.mass.gov/orgs/executive-office-of-economic-development
Executive Office of Labor and Workforce Development	Lauren Jones	Department of Career Services	https://www.mass.gov/orgs/executive-office-of-labor-and-workforce-development
Executive Office of Labor and Workforce Development	Lauren Jones	Department of Industrial Accidents	https://www.mass.gov/orgs/executive-office-of-labor-and-workforce-development
Executive Office of Labor and Workforce Development	Lauren Jones	Department of Labor Relations	https://www.mass.gov/orgs/executive-office-of-labor-and-workforce-development
Executive Office of Labor and Workforce Development	Lauren Jones	Department of Labor Standards	https://www.mass.gov/orgs/executive-office-of-labor-and-workforce-development
Executive Office of Labor and Workforce Development	Lauren Jones	Department of Unemployment Assistance	https://www.mass.gov/orgs/executive-office-of-labor-and-workforce-development
Executive Office of Public Safety and Security	Gina Kwon	Department of Criminal Justice Information Systems	https://www.mass.gov/orgs/executive-office-of-public-safety-and-security
Executive Office of Public Safety and Security	Gina Kwon	Department of Correction	https://www.mass.gov/orgs/executive-office-of-public-safety-and-security
Executive Office of Public Safety and Security	Gina Kwon	Department of Fire Services	https://www.mass.gov/orgs/executive-office-of-public-safety-and-security
Executive Office of Public Safety and Security	Gina Kwon	Department of Public Safety	https://www.mass.gov/orgs/executive-office-of-public-safety-and-security
Executive Office of Public Safety and Security	Gina Kwon	Department of State Police	https://www.mass.gov/orgs/executive-office-of-public-safety-and-security
Executive Office of Public Safety and Security	Gina Kwon	Emergency Management Agency	https://www.mass.gov/orgs/executive-office-of-public-safety-and-security
Executive Office of Public Safety and Security	Gina Kwon	Merit Rating Board	https://www.mass.gov/orgs/executive-office-of-public-safety-and-security
Executive Office of Public Safety and Security	Gina Kwon	Massachusetts Organized Militia	https://www.mass.gov/orgs/executive-office-of-public-safety-and-security
Executive Office of Public Safety and Security	Gina Kwon	Municipal Police Training Committee	https://www.mass.gov/orgs/executive-office-of-public-safety-and-security
Executive Office of Public Safety and Security	Gina Kwon	Office of the Chief Medical Examiner	https://www.mass.gov/orgs/executive-office-of-public-safety-and-security
Executive Office of Public Safety and Security	Gina Kwon	Parole Board	https://www.mass.gov/orgs/executive-office-of-public-safety-and-security
Executive Office of Public Safety and Security	Gina Kwon	Sex Offender Registry Board	https://www.mass.gov/orgs/executive-office-of-public-safety-and-security
Executive Office of Technology Services and Security	Jason Snyder		https://www.mass.gov/orgs/executive-office-of-technology-services-and-security
Executive Office of Education	Stephen Zrike	Department of Early Education and Care	https://www.mass.gov/orgs/executive-office-of-education
Executive Office of Education	Stephen Zrike	Department of Elementary and Secondary Education	https://www.mass.gov/orgs/executive-office-of-education
Executive Office of Education	Stephen Zrike	Department of Higher Education	https://www.mass.gov/orgs/executive-office-of-education
Executive Office of Education	Stephen Zrike	Public Colleges and Universities	https://www.mass.gov/orgs/executive-office-of-education
Executive Office of Transportation	Phillip Eng		https://www.mass.gov/orgs/massachusetts-department-of-transportation
Executive Office of Housing and Livable Communities	Jennifer Maddox	Department of Housing and Community Development	https://www.mass.gov/orgs/executive-office-of-housing-and-livable-communities

== Legislature ==
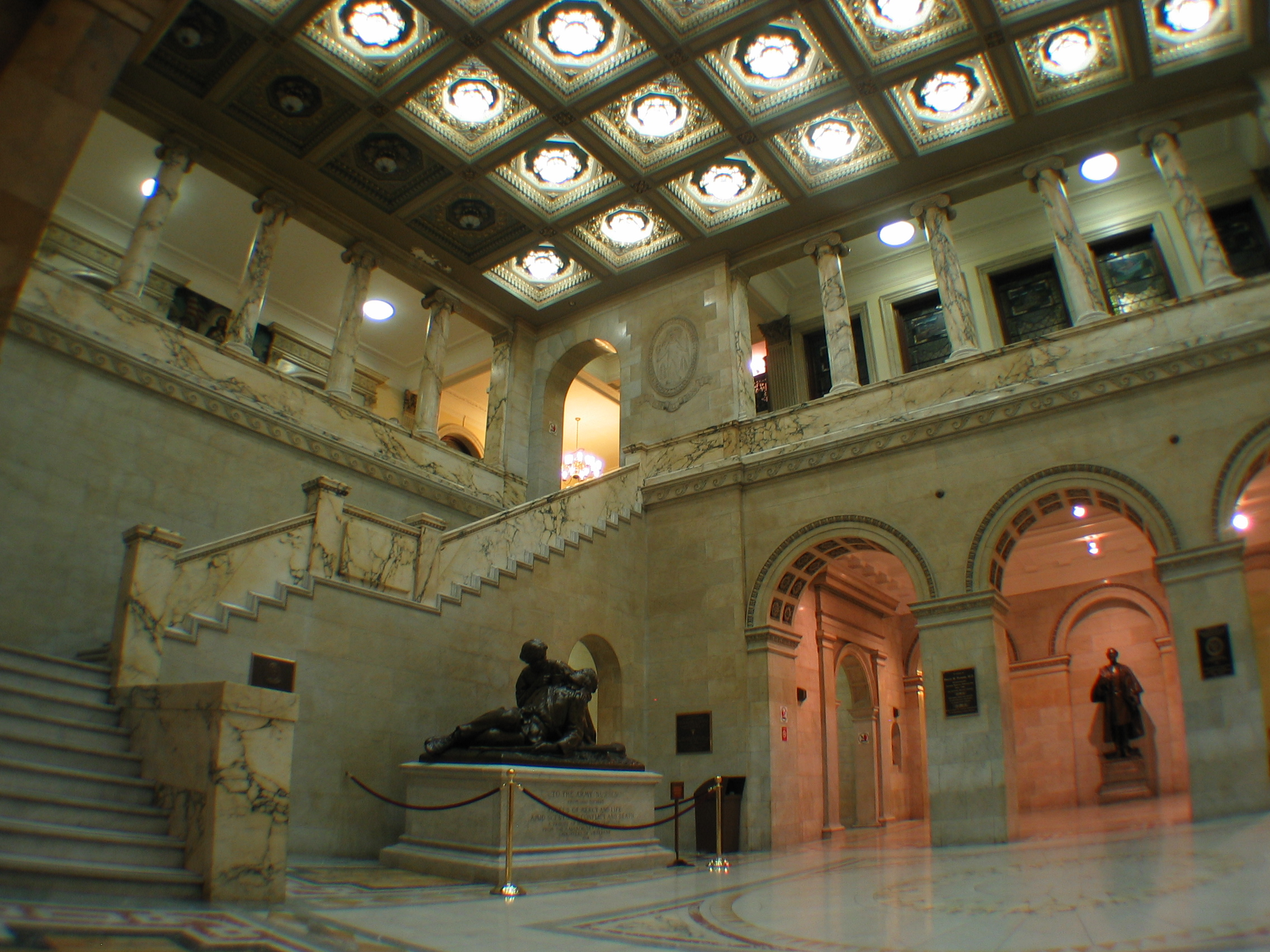
State House interior

The state legislature is formally known as the Massachusetts General Court, reflecting its colonial-era judicial duties. It has two houses: the 40-member Senate and the 160-member House of Representatives. Members of both houses have two-year terms. The Speaker of the House presides over the House of Representatives and controls the flow of legislation. The President is the presiding officer of the Senate.

The General Court is responsible for enacting the state's laws. A bill signed by the governor, or passed by two-thirds of both houses over his or her veto, becomes law. Its session laws are published in the Acts and Resolves of Massachusetts, which are codified as the General Laws of Massachusetts. On June 9, 2017, S&P Global Ratings downgraded Massachusetts' bond rating to AA (the third-highest tier) due to the legislature's inability to replenish the state's rainy day fund in the face of above-average economic growth.

Senate leadership	House leadership
President ▌Karen Spilka (D - Massachusetts Senate's 2nd Middlesex and Norfolk district)	Speaker of the House ▌Ronald Mariano (D - 3rd Norfolk)
President pro tempore ▌Will Brownsberger (D - 2nd Suffolk and Middlesex)	Speaker pro tempore ▌Kate Hogan (D - 3rd Middlesex)
Majority Leader ▌Cynthia Stone Creem (D - 1st Middlesex and Norfolk)	Majority Leader; Michael Moran (D - 18th Suffolk)
Minority Leader ▌Bruce Tarr (R - 1st Essex and Middlesex)	Minority Leader ▌Bradley Jones Jr. (R - 20th Middlesex)

== Judiciary ==
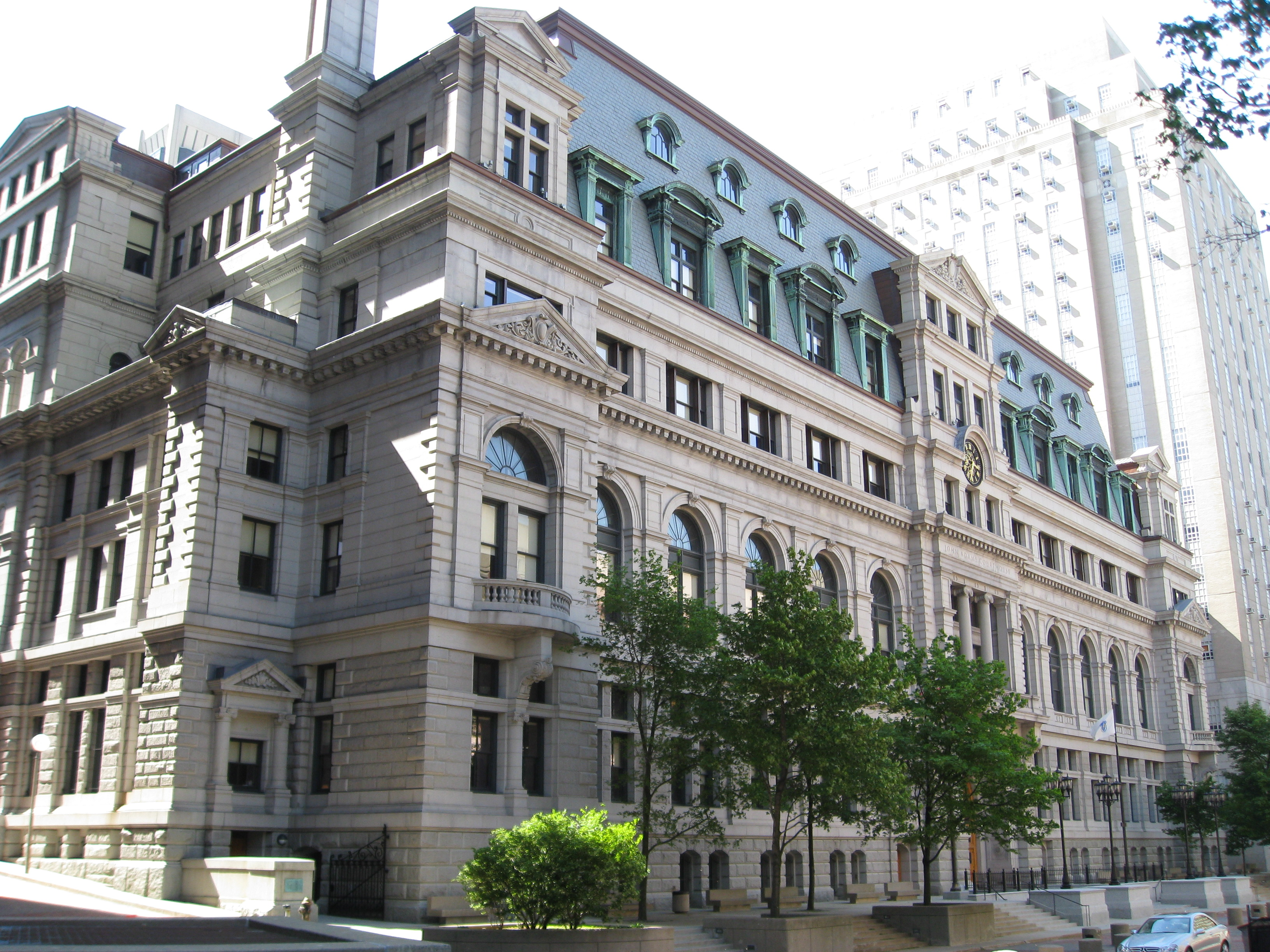
The John Adams Courthouse, home of the Supreme Judicial Court

The judiciary is the branch of the government that interprets and applies state law, ensures equal justice under law, and provides a mechanism for dispute resolution. The Massachusetts court system consists of the Supreme Judicial Court, the Appeals Court, and seven trial-court departments.

=== Supreme Judicial Court ===
Judicial power is centered in the Supreme Judicial Court, which oversees the court system. In addition to its appellate functions, the Supreme Judicial Court is responsible for the governance of the judiciary and the bar, makes (or approves) rules for the operation of the courts and, on request, provides advisory opinions to the governor and legislature on legal issues. The Supreme Judicial Court also oversees affiliated judicial agencies, including the Board of Bar Overseers, the Board of Bar Examiners, the Clients' Security Board, the Massachusetts Mental Health Legal Advisors Committee, and Massachusetts Correctional Legal Services.

Position	Name	Born	Began service	Mandatory retirement	Appointed by	Law school
Chief Justice	Kimberly S. Budd	October 23, 1966 (age 59)	December 1, 2020 (Note: Associate Justice from August 24, 2016 to December 1, 2020.)	2036	Charlie Baker	Harvard
Senior Associate Justice	Frank Gaziano	September 8, 1963 (age 63)	August 18, 2016	2034	Charlie Baker	Suffolk
Associate Justice	Scott L. Kafker	April 24, 1959 (age 67)	August 21, 2017	2029	Charlie Baker	Chicago
Associate Justice	Dalila Argaez Wendlandt	1968 or 1969 (age 56–57)	December 4, 2020	2038/2039	Charlie Baker	Stanford
Associate Justice	Serge Georges Jr.	1969 or 1970 (age 55–56)	December 16, 2020	2039/2040	Charlie Baker	Suffolk
Associate Justice	Bessie Dewar	July 4, 1980 (age 46)	January 16, 2024	2050	Maura Healey	Yale
Associate Justice	Gabrielle Wolohojian	December 16, 1960 (age 65)	April 22, 2024	2030	Maura Healey	Columbia

=== Appeals Court ===
The Appeals Court the state appellate court, which means that the justices review decisions made in the Trial Courts. The Appeals Court also has jurisdiction over appeals from final decisions of three State agencies: the Appellate Tax Board, the Industrial Accident Board and the Commonwealth Employment Relations Board. The Appeals Court consists of a chief justice and twenty-four associate justices.

=== Trial courts ===
- Superior Court
- District Court
- Land Court
- Housing Court
- Juvenile Court
- Probate and Family Court
- Boston Municipal Court

== County government ==
Only the southeastern third of the state has county governments; in western, central, and northeastern Massachusetts, traditional county-level government was eliminated during the late 1990s. District attorneys and sheriffs are elected by constituencies which mainly follow county boundaries, and are funded by the state budget. Sheriff's departments operate correctional facilities and perform service of process in the county.

=== Sheriffs ===
Sheriffs in Massachusetts
County	Sheriff	Party	Website
Barnstable	Donna D. Buckley	Democrat	Link
Berkshire	Thomas Bowler	Democrat	Link
Bristol	Paul Heroux	Democrat	Link
Dukes	Robert Ogden	Democrat	Link
Essex	Kevin Coppinger	Democrat	Link
Franklin	Christopher Donelan	Democrat	Link
Hampden	Nick Cocchi	Democrat	Link
Hampshire	Patrick Cahillane	Democrat	Link
Middlesex	Peter Koutoujian	Democrat	Link
Nantucket	James Perelman	Democrat	Link
Norfolk	Patrick W. McDermott	Democrat	Link
Plymouth	Joseph McDonald, Jr.	Republican	Link
Suffolk	Steven Tompkins	Democrat	Link
Worcester	Lewis Evangelidis	Republican	Link

=== District attorney ===
District attorneys are elected in 11 districts and serve as a public prosecutor representing the Commonwealth during criminal prosecutions. Most district attorneys are elected within the boundaries of a single county, and the district courts they operate in are within that county. The exception is Hampshire and Franklin Counties and the Town of Athol which make up the Northwestern District; and Barnstable, Dukes, and Nantucket Counties which make up the Cape and Islands District. Some districts that follow traditional county lines are officially known by a different name than the county, but they may also informally be called by the county name.

District attorneys of Massachusetts
District (Counties)	District attorney	Party	Website
Berkshire District	Andrea Harrington	Democrat	Link
Bristol District	Thomas Quinn, III	Democrat	Link
Cape and Islands District (Barnstable, Dukes, Nantucket)	Robert Galibois	Democrat	Link
Eastern District (Essex)	Jonathan Blodget	Democrat	Link
Hampden District	Anthony Gulluni	Democrat	Link
Middle District (Worcester)	Joseph Early	Democrat	Link
Norfolk	Michael Morrissey	Democrat	Link
Northern (Middlesex)	Marian Ryan	Democrat	Link
Northwestern (Hampshire, Franklin)	David Sullivan	Democrat	Link
Plymouth	Timothy Cruz	Republican	Link
Suffolk	Kevin Hayden	Democrat	Link

=== Registry of deeds ===
All counties in Massachusetts have at least one registry of deeds, which is responsible for recording and holding copies of deeds, titles, and other land records within their district. Each registry is run by an elected register of deeds, who serves for 6 year terms. Most counties have one registry, but some are divided into separate districts with their own registry. There are 21 registries.

Registry of deeds in Massachusetts
County	Registry	Register	Website
Barnstable	Barnstable	▌John F. Mead (R)	
Berkshire	North Berkshire	▌Maria T. Ziemba (D)	
Berkshire	Middle Berkshire	▌Patsy Harris (D)	
Berkshire	South Berkshire	▌Michelle L. Laramee-Jenney (I)	
Bristol	North Bristol	▌Barry J. Amaral (D)	
Bristol	Fall River	▌Bernard J. McDonald, III (D)	
Bristol	South Bristol	Sherrilynn M. Mello	
Dukes	Dukes	▌Paulo C. Deoliveiria (D)	
Essex	North Essex	▌M. Paul Iannuccillo (D)	
Essex	South Essex	▌John L. O'Brien, Jr. (D)	
Franklin	Franklin	▌Scott A. Cote (D)	
Hampden	Hampden	▌Cheryl A. Coakley-Rivera (D)	
Hampshire	Hampshire	▌Mary K. Olberding (D)	
Middlesex	North Middlesex	▌Richard P. Howe, Jr. (D)	
Middlesex	South Middlesex	▌Maria C. Curatone (D)	
Nantucket	Nantucket	▌Jennifer H. Ferreira (I)	
Norfolk	Norfolk	▌William P. O'Donnell (D)	
Plymouth	Plymouth	▌John R. Buckley, Jr. (D)	
Suffolk	Suffolk	▌Stephen J. Murphy (D)	
Worcester	North Worcester	▌Kathleen Reynolds Daigneault (D)	
Worcester	South Worcester	▌Kathryn A. Toomey (D)	

== Municipal government ==
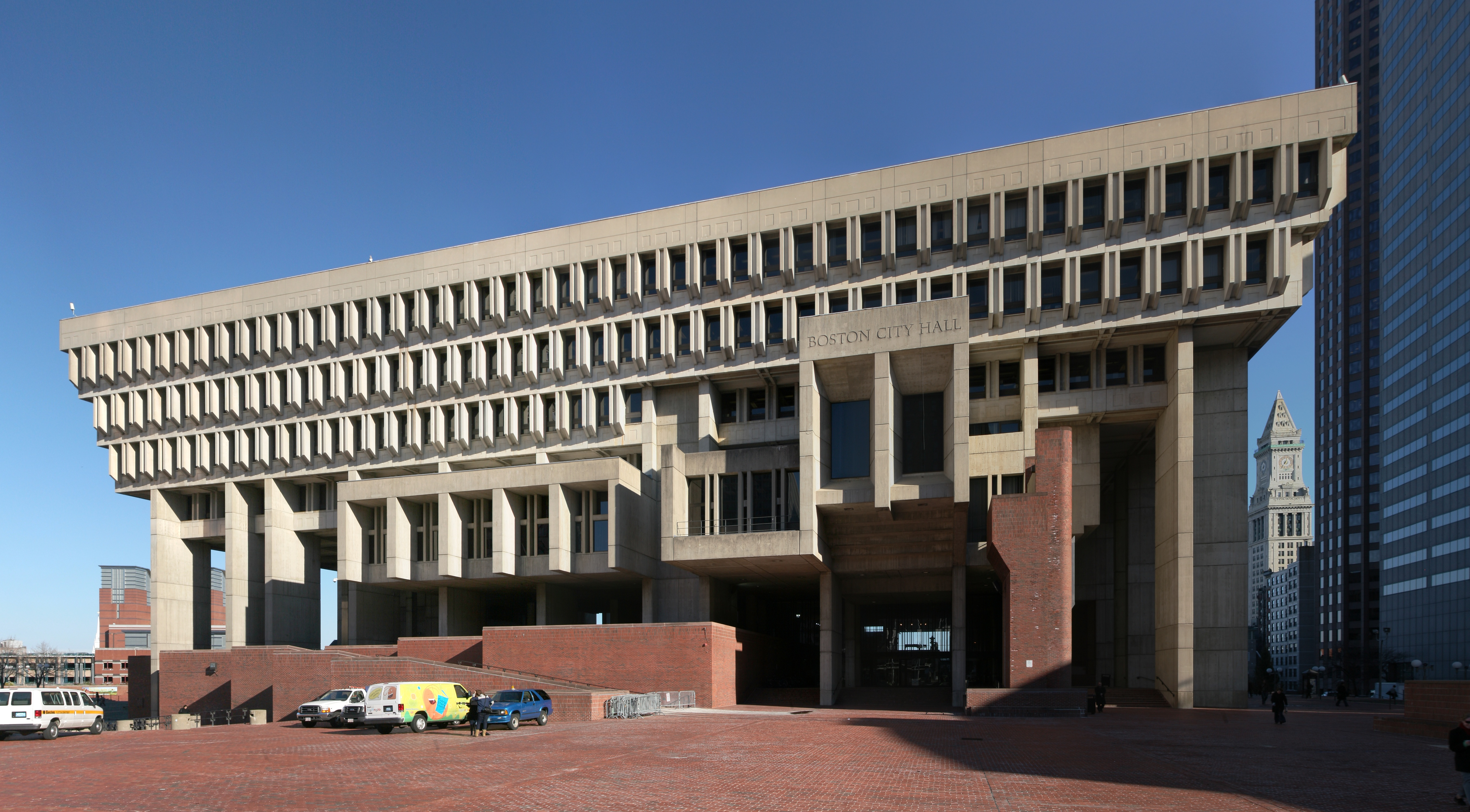
Boston City Hall

Massachusetts shares with the five other New England states the New England town form of government. All land in Massachusetts is divided among cities and towns and there are no unincorporated areas, population centers, or townships. Massachusetts has four kinds of public-school districts: local schools, regional schools, vocational-technical schools, and charter schools.

Amendment Article 89 (LXXXIX) of the Massachusetts Constitution defines the powers of self-government that municipalities are entitled to. Additional powers, such as the ability to collect certain taxes, are delegated to municipalities under state law. The article requires that General Laws passed by the General Court apply to at least two municipalities. Special Laws that apply to only one municipality must be enacted in response to a home rule petition from that city or town, or with a two-thirds majority in the General Court, or for the purpose of establishing, disestablishing, or modifying municipal boundaries.

Proposition 2½ gives municipalities the right to state payment of municipal costs incurred as a result of any new state mandates implemented after January 1, 1981. Cities and towns can vote to accept a new mandate, or ask the Massachusetts State Auditor to determine the amount of funding owed; if the legislature does not provide that amount then ask the Massachusetts Superior Court for a ruling that grants the municipality an exemption from complying with unfunded mandates.

== Elections and politics ==
Massachusetts is known for its progressive politics, and is a stronghold of American Liberalism and the Democratic Party. In a 2018 Gallup poll Massachusetts was the state with the highest percentage of its population identifying as liberal and the lowest percentage identifying as conservative, at 35% and 21% respectively. This and the high profile of well known politicians from Massachusetts such as the Kennedy family has led to the derogatory political phrase "Massachusetts Liberal".

== Ratings and rankings ==
- 48 out of 50 for transparency of electoral candidate financial conflicts of interest (Pioneer Institute, 2019)
- B− for online access to government spending data (Public Interest Research Group, 2018)
- Corruption, out of 50 (higher numbers are better): 16 for convictions, 22 for convictions per capita, 49 as ranked by reporters, 39 in lacking stringent laws (2015)
- D+ for integrity (Center for Public Integrity, 2015)

=== Transparency ===
The state has an open-meeting law enforced by the attorney general, and a public-records law enforced by the Secretary of the Commonwealth. A 2008 report by the Better Government Association and National Freedom of Information Coalition ranked Massachusetts 43rd out of the 50 US states in government transparency. It gave the state a grade of "F", based on the time, cost, and comprehensiveness of access to public records. Access to government records and the actions of the Secretary in enforcing the law became an issue in the 2014 campaign for the office. Incumbent William Galvin cited his previous requests that the legislature revise the Public Records Law to facilitate access. According to the governor, he is exempt from the Public Records Law. A reform law was signed on June 3, 2016 and took effect on January 1, 2017, imposing stricter time limits and lower costs.

== See also ==
- Administrative divisions of Massachusetts
- Courts of Massachusetts
- Index of Massachusetts-related articles
- Judiciary of Massachusetts
- Law enforcement in Massachusetts
- Law of Massachusetts
- List of United States representatives from Massachusetts
- List of United States senators from Massachusetts
- Massachusetts's congressional delegations
- Massachusetts's congressional districts
- Outline of Massachusetts
- Politics of Massachusetts
- State governments of the United States (comparison)
- United States Congress
