= Judiciary of Massachusetts =

The judiciary of Massachusetts is the branch of the government of Massachusetts that interprets and applies the law of Massachusetts, ensures equal justice under law, and provides a mechanism for dispute resolution. The judicial power in Massachusetts is reposed in the Supreme Judicial Court, which superintends the entire system of courts.

== Courts ==
The Massachusetts court system consists of the Supreme Judicial Court, the Appeals Court, and the seven Trial Court departments.

=== Supreme Judicial Court ===
The Massachusetts Supreme Judicial Court is the court of last resort. An appeal from a conviction of first degree murder goes directly to the Supreme Judicial Court. The Supreme Judicial Court can also elect to bypass review by the Appeals Court and hear a case on "direct appellate review."

=== Appeals Court ===
The Massachusetts Appeals Court is the intermediate appellate court. The court hears most appeals from the departments of the Trial Courts of Massachusetts and administrative tribunals.

=== Trial Court ===
The seven Trial Court departments are the:

- Superior Court
- District Court
- Land Court
- Housing Court
- Juvenile Court
- Probate and Family Court
- Boston Municipal Court

In the District Court Department, appeals in certain civil cases are made first to the Appellate Division of the District Court before being eligible for appeal to the Appeals Court. After a decision by the Appeals Court, parties may seek "further appellate review" by requesting review by the Supreme Judicial Court.

=== Other tribunals ===
Other administrative tribunals include the:

- Massachusetts Appellate Tax Board
- Massachusetts Division of Labor Relations
- Massachusetts Department of Industrial Accidents
- Massachusetts Labor Relations Commission

=== Municipal Hearings Courts ===
In Massachusetts, Citations issued by municipalities can be appealed to a Municipal Hearings Officer who is appointed by each Town's executive, or a Select board. These quasi-judicial officers hear cases in a similar way as a District Court Clerk-Magistrate by weighing evidence, establishing a burden of proof.

=== Justices of the Peace ===
Justices of the Peace in Massachusetts are commissioned public officers whose functions are primarily ministerial in nature. Their duties include solemnizing marriages, administering oaths, taking acknowledgments, and performing other ministerial acts as prescribed by law.

Historically, Justices of the Peace exercised broader judicial authority, including service on the Courts of General Sessions of the Peace in their respective counties. That judicial role has since been abolished, and modern Justices of the Peace do not exercise general adjudicatory powers.

A limited statutory function remains in connection with the impoundment of animals. If the amount due for impounded animals is not paid within fourteen days after notice, the person who impounded the animals may apply to a Justice of the Peace or to a city or town clerk. Upon payment of the prescribed fee, the Justice or clerk issues a warrant appointing two disinterested persons to determine the amount owed for damages, costs, and expenses. The appointed persons, after being sworn, assess the amount due, including reasonable compensation for their services. In this process, the Justice of the Peace does not conduct a hearing, receive evidence, or make findings of fact; the role is limited to issuing the warrant and administering the oath.

== Administration ==
In addition to appellate functions, the Supreme Judicial Court is responsible for the general superintendence of the judiciary and of the bar, makes or approves rules for the operations of all the courts, and in certain instances, provides advisory opinions, upon request, to the Governor and Legislature on various legal issues. The Supreme Judicial Court also oversees several affiliated agencies of the judicial branch, including the Board of Bar Overseers, the Board of Bar Examiners, the Clients' Security Board, the Massachusetts Mental Health Legal Advisors Committee, and Massachusetts Correctional Legal Services. The Massachusetts Court Administrator, subject to the superintendence power of the Supreme Judicial Court and in consultation with the Massachusetts Chief Justice of the Trial Court, has general superintendence of the administration of the Trial Court.

The Massachusetts Executive Office of the Trial Court was established to facilitate communication and enable joint leadership of the Trial Court and comprises an Office of Court Management and an Office of the Chief Justice of the Trial Court. The Massachusetts Office of the Commissioner of Probation supervises the Massachusetts Probation Service. The Massachusetts Office of Jury Commissioner oversees the selection and management of all jurors in the Commonwealth until they appear at the courthouse.

MassCourts is the case management system used by the courts. It does not allow documents to be viewed online, and the courts have deliberately blocked public access to basic information for most cases (particularly, criminal cases in District Court and all cases in Superior Court). In June 2015, court judges heard consultation on a proposed revision to the policy that aims to make civil cases in Superior Court publicly accessible. Many journalists argued for a more open framework but critics of the proposal suggested that case filings containing libellous descriptions of witnesses could be used to discriminate against individuals.

The decisions of the Massachusetts Supreme Judicial Court, the Massachusetts Appeals Court, and the Appellate Divisions of the Massachusetts District Court and the Boston Municipal Court departments, which are published in the Massachusetts Reports, Massachusetts Appeals Court Reports, and Massachusetts Appellate Division Reports, respectively. The Massachusetts Law Reporter publishes decisions from the Massachusetts Superior Court.

== Selection and retirement of judges ==
Under the Massachusetts Constitution of 1780, which remains in effect today, the governor of Massachusetts appoints all state court judges with the consent of the elected Massachusetts Governor's Council (Executive Council). The Governor's Council very rarely rejects judicial nominees: between 1993 and 2011, the council did not reject any governor's judicial appointment. In 2012 and 2013, three nominees of Governor Deval Patrick were rejected by the council.

Every governor since 1975 has issued an executive order that sets forth the list of criteria for judicial nominees and creates a Judicial Nominating Commission (JNC) to screen potential nominees; the members of the JNC are appointed and dismissed by the governor and serve as volunteers for one-year terms. The establishment of a JNC in Massachusetts was first adopted by Governor Michael Dukakis, as a measure to better insulate the judicial from political or partisan considerations. The JNC takes applications from candidates for judicial vacancies, reviews the applications, conducts interviews, and forwards a name or names to the governor for nomination. Governor Mitt Romney introduced a "blind" vetting procedure in 2003, under which the JNC conducts its initial review of applications without knowing the name of the applicants. That process has been adopted by all of Romney's successors.

Initially, there was no mandatory retirement age for judges in Massachusetts. A constitutional amendment adopted in 1972 set a mandatory retirement age of 70 years. The Court Reform Act of 1978 allows judges who reach the mandatory retirement age of 70 to serve part-time on the bench upon being appointed by the chief justice of the Massachusetts Supreme Judicial Court (Massachusetts SJC) for 90-day "recall" assignments. The "recalled judges" are compensated on a per diem basis. The system also applies to the Massachusetts Trial Court. The first retired judge to be recalled to the Massachusetts Appeals Court was David A. Rose.

The state Commission on Judicial Conduct investigates ethics complaints about state judges, and makes recommendations to the Massachusetts SJC, which has the ultimate power to suspend, censure, or remove a judge for misconduct.

== History ==
Before 1978, all trial courts except the Land Court were county or local courts funded through the counties. The Massachusetts Trial Court was created by Chapter 478 of the Acts of 1978 that reorganized the courts into seven Trial Court Departments. Administrative Justices became responsible for the administration of each court department and as part of the overhaul, all judges became state judges with the same salary and benefits.

A second court reorganization in 1992 greatly expanded the Juvenile Court Department and ended trial de novo in the District Court Department. It also replaced Administrative Justices with Chief Justices and created a central office headed by the Chief Justice for Administration and Management.

As of December 2010, there are 9 Chief Justices and 401 Associate Justices positions authorized by statute in the system with trial judges sitting in more than one 130 locations across the state.

== See also ==
- Government of Massachusetts
- Law of Massachusetts
- Law enforcement in Massachusetts
