= Courts of Massachusetts =

Courts of Massachusetts include:

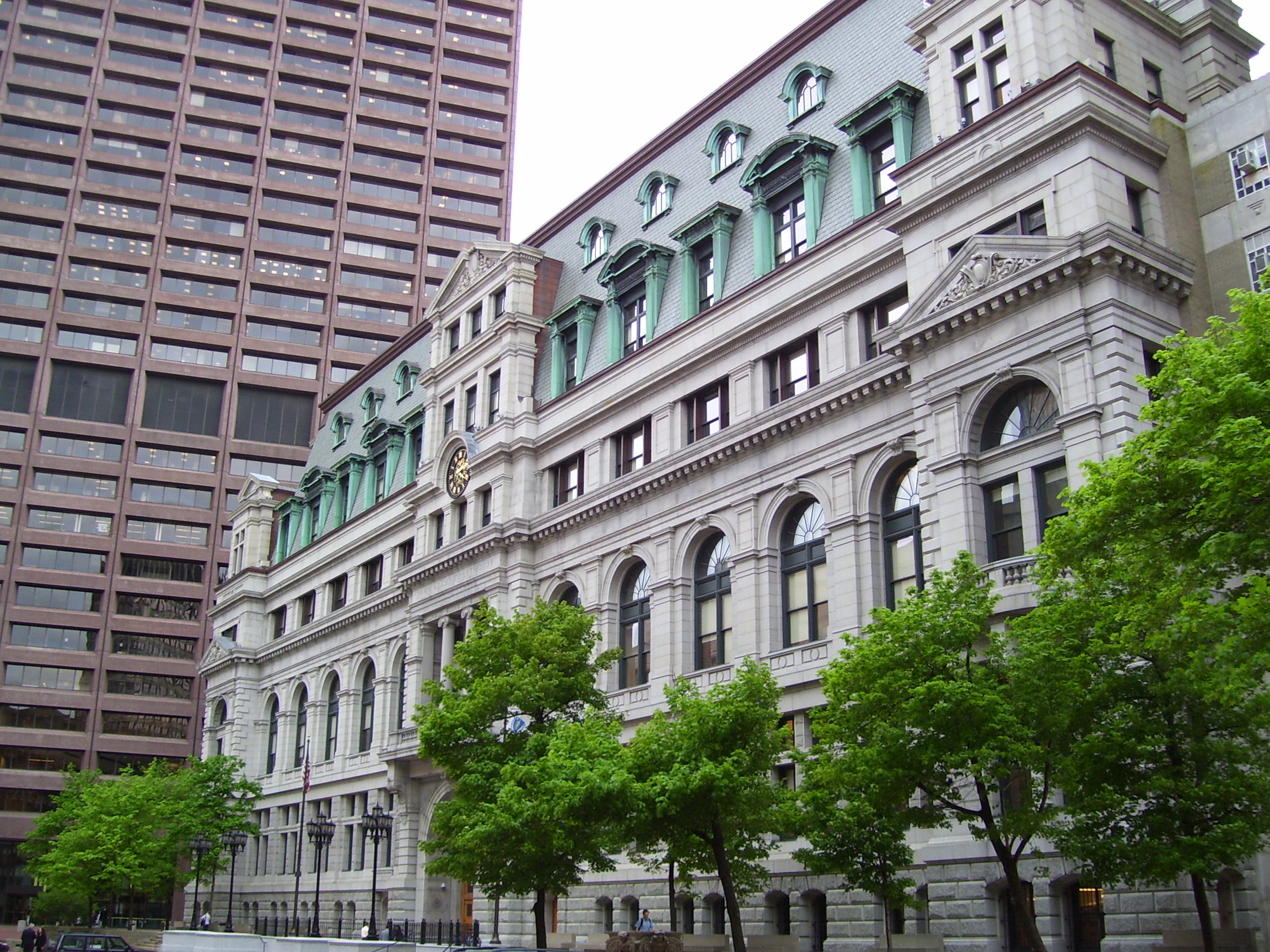
John Adams Courthouse in Boston, Massachusetts, home to the Massachusetts Supreme Judicial Court and Massachusetts Appeals Court

State courts of Massachusetts
Judicial courts

- Massachusetts Supreme Judicial Court
  - Massachusetts Appeals Court
    - Massachusetts Trial Court
      - Massachusetts Superior Court (14 divisions)
      - Massachusetts District Court
      - Massachusetts Boston Municipal Court
      - Massachusetts Land Court
      - Massachusetts Housing Court
      - Massachusetts Juvenile Court
      - Massachusetts Probate and Family Court

Administrative courts

- Massachusetts Appellate Tax Board
- Massachusetts Division of Labor Relations

Federal courts located in Massachusetts

- United States Court of Appeals for the First Circuit (headquartered in Boston, having jurisdiction over the United States District Courts of Maine, Massachusetts, New Hampshire, Rhode Island, and Puerto Rico)
- United States District Court for the District of Massachusetts

== See also ==
- Judiciary of Massachusetts
- Counties of Massachusetts
