= Education in Massachusetts =

Education in Massachusetts consists of public and private schools in the U.S. state of the Commonwealth of Massachusetts. Education pursuits in Massachusetts have existed from the colonial era of Massachusetts Bay Colony to the present. Outside of the current public University of Massachusetts system, and Massachusetts Community Colleges systems, are numerous public or private colleges and universities; and elementary, middle, and high schools.

== History ==
Historically education has long been an aspiration and principle of New World settlers to Massachusetts since inception, and shares its common initiative and foundation with the wider New England region.

=== Timeline ===
- On April 23, 1635 the Boston Latin School was established.
- In 1636, Harvard College was established.
- In 1643 the community of Dedham established the first tax-supported public school in America.
- In 1890 The College Club of Boston becomes the first women's college club in the United States.
- In 1966 the Metropolitan Council for Educational Opportunity, Inc. (METCO, Inc.) program is launched to desegregate schools
- In 2005 the separate Department of Early Education and Care is formed after being legal formed a year prior.
- In 2008 the Commonwealth instituted Educational reform.
- In 2024 through statewide referendum (The Proposition Question #2) passes with voters seeking to remove the Massachusetts Comprehensive Assessment System as a statewide graduation requirement.

== Governance ==
The Commonwealth maintains its own Executive Office of Education. Presided over by the state's Massachusetts Secretary of Education, Patrick Tutwiler who is appointed by Governor of the Commonwealth. Established in 2008, the Executive Office of Education oversees and coordinates the direction and efforts of:

The Executive Office of Education comprises three main department agencies under its oversight:

- the Department of Early Education and Care (Infant/Toddler & Pre-schools)
- the Department of Elementary and Secondary Education (Pre-K-12)
- the Department of Higher Education and the state's 29 public colleges and universities to connect programs and policies across the entire public education system.

In addition to the educational oversight under the Executive Governor, the General Court (legislature) maintains a bipartisan Joint Committee on Education.

=== Funding ===
Many of the state's school districts receive educational funding from any number of sources including the state lottery, property taxes, as well as federal, state, and local funding sources. In past years, many school districts of within municipalities across the Commonwealth additionally sought electronic communications franchise regulatory fees from wireline providers operating in the state as a means of additional revenue or for sponsorship of broadband connectivity.

== Primary and secondary education ==
Public primary and secondary education (Pre-K–12) in Massachusetts is under the overview of the Massachusetts state Board of education known as the Massachusetts Board of Elementary and Secondary Education.

=== Vocational schools ===
There are provisions under Chapter 74 of the General Laws of Massachusetts for the establishment or provisioning of recognized vocational school or "career technical education" programs at the secondary or higher education levels.

=== Federal involvement ===
Massachusetts schools had prior sought to adhere to federal guidelines like those outlined in the No Child Left Behind Act, 2002 (NCLB). In 2012 President Barack Obama signed a waiver to the state of Massachusetts and several other states regarding NCLB. The state has since sought to formulate a plan for the transition to the Every Student Succeeds Act, 2015 (ESSA) statute.

== Higher education—colleges and universities ==
=== Faculties of study ===
- Engineering schools in Massachusetts
- Law schools in Massachusetts

== See also ==
- Boston desegregation busing crisis
- Education in New England
- List of colleges and universities in metropolitan Boston
- Massachusetts Board of Library Commissioners
