= Mtel =

Mtel may refer to:

- Massachusetts Tests for Educator Licensure
- Mtel (Bosnia and Herzegovina), a telecommunications company in Bosnia and Herzegovina
- Mtel (Montenegro), a telecommunication company in Montenegro
