= MBTA safety crisis =

Railroad safety reputation crisis

- Date: 2021-2023
- Location: Greater Boston, Massachusetts
- Type: Transportation safety crisis
- Participants: MBTA, FTA
- Outcome: Federal intervention and safety reformations

Between 2021 and 2023, the Massachusetts Bay Transportation Authority went through a safety crisis that involved federal investigators, including train collisions and a death in the post-COVID recovery of the MBTA.

== Background ==
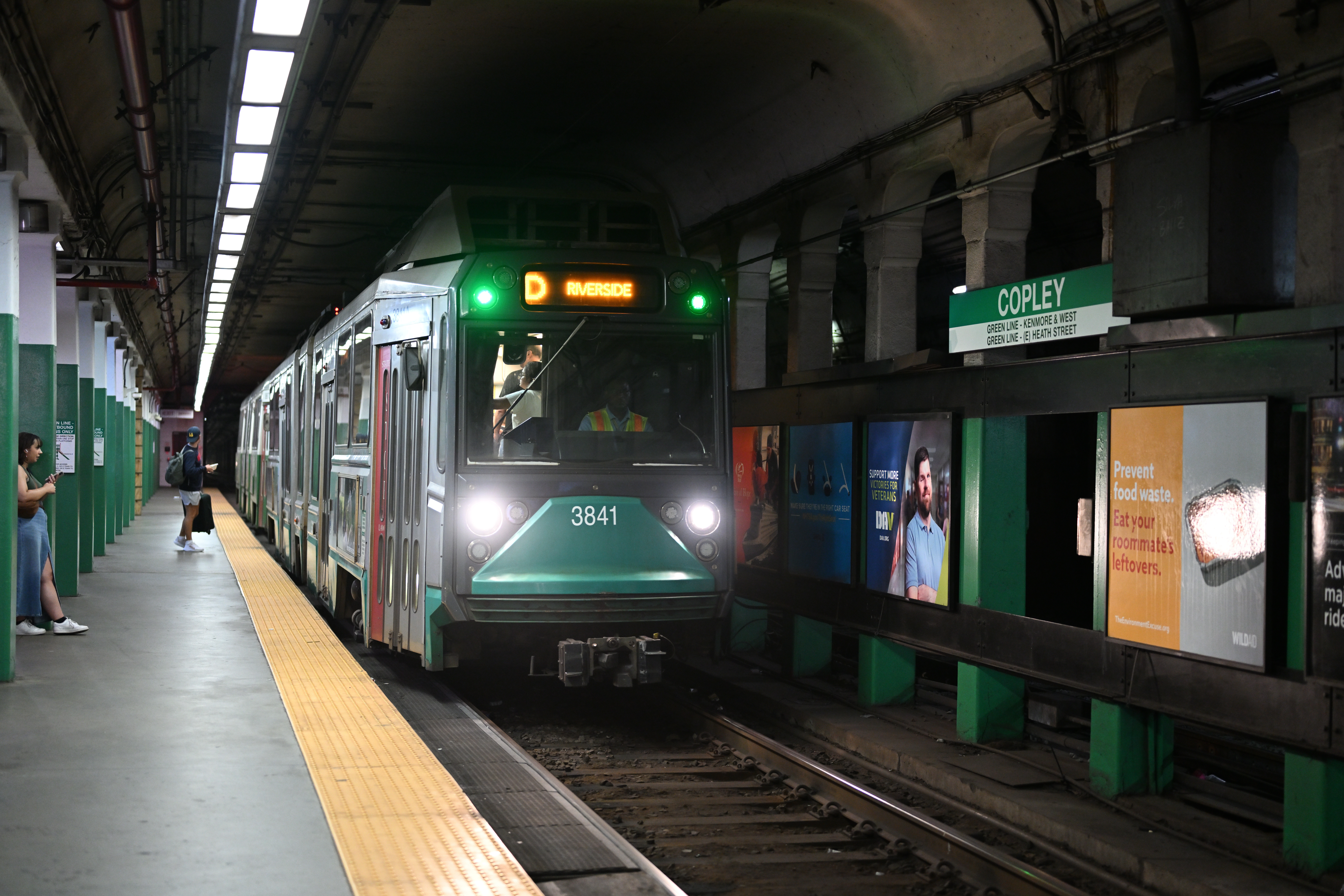
A Green Line train at Copley station; this train was not the train involved, but an example of what a similar train would have looked like.

The MBTA had been struggling with aging equipment since a long time before the crisis. Starting in the summer of 2021, a few safety incidents led to the eventual federal investigation.

In late July, two Green Line subway trains collided near Boston University during the Friday evening rush, injuring 27 people. The subsequent federal investigation determined that the rear train had been traveling 23 mph over the speed limit and that the operator had failed to apply the brakes before hitting the other car.

A month later, an escalator at Back Bay Station suddenly reversed while traveling at full speed, sending all the riders falling to the bottom suddenly and hospitalizing nine of them, mostly at the bottom.

Later on January 21, 2022, a 68-year-old Wilmington woman named Robbi Sausville Devine was hit and killed by a subway train while driving through a railroad crossing. Officials determined that a worker had failed to restore the crossing's safety system less than an hour before her car entered the crossing.

Then, a Red Line passenger, Robinson Lalin, died after his arm became trapped between closed subway doors at Broadway Station, and he was dragged between the train and the station wall for 105 feet (32 m). It happened due to a short circuit of the subway's door systems, which let the train move even when there was a blockage. This forcefully triggered an investigation by the Federal Transit Administration.

During the FTA investigation, more safety incidents kept on happening. During a Blue Line maintenance session on May 7th through May 9th, construction vehicles had derailed 3 separate times in the course of only 3 days. The FTA formally notified the MBTA that it was "extremely concerned with the ongoing safety issues." On June 2nd, again, two green line subway trains collided at the Government Center Station, hospitalizing three train operators.

== Involvement of Federal Investigators ==
The FTA released its findings in August 2022 in a 90-page report that showed the failings of the MBTA management. Inspectors documented dispatchers working shifts that exceed 20 hours, maintenance workers placed in danger by passing trains, employees performing safety-critical roles with expired certifications, and slowly deteriorating track sections with no recovery plans in place.

After the FTA's federal review of the T's subway system, they found that a focus on long-term construction and reformation projects had harmed and threatened day-to-day service and safety.

=== Shut down of the Orange Line ===
On July 21 on an old Orange Line train, a metal panel on the bottom of the train broke off and made contact with the "third rail" of the train tracks, which was electrified with high voltages. The train caught fire while crossing a river towards Medford from Somerville. Some passengers broke the windows in order to breathe or escape from the fire in the trains, while one passenger jumped off the bridge into the river to swim to safety. This incident caused public outrage because MBTA was using an aging fleet of subway trains.

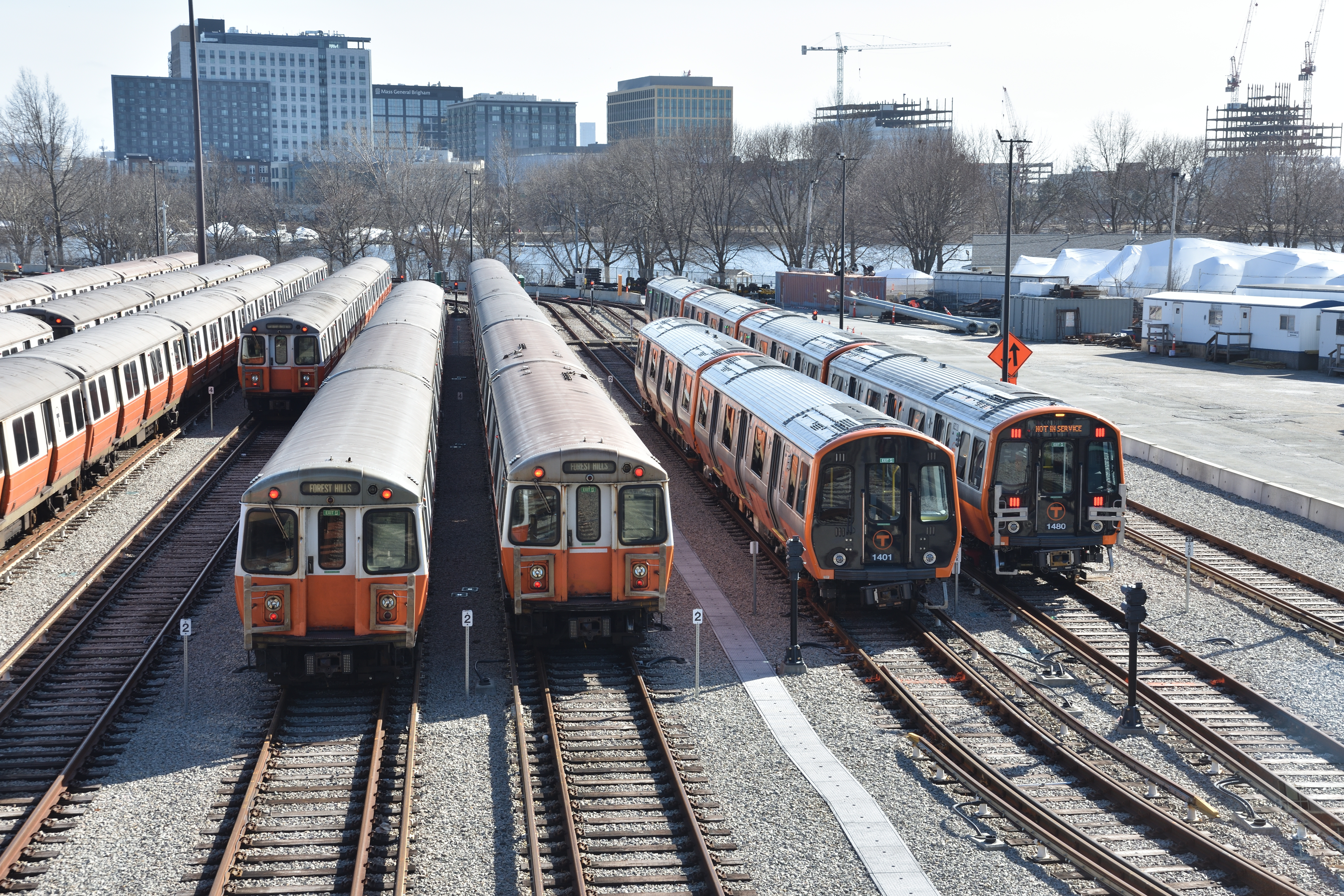
The Orange Line of the MBTA was shut down for safety reforms.

After the incident, state leaders made a decision to shut down the entire Orange Line for 30 days to perform deferred maintenance, since the trains had mechanical problems frequently, which also caused a disruption for hundreds of thousands of riders. The FTA also gave 53 required actions to be performed by the MBTA.

In 2023, federal officials rejected the T's first worker safety plan, saying it didn't go far enough or fast enough. Massachusetts lawmakers also moved to fix the broken oversight system. The Legislature advanced a bill that would take MBTA subway safety oversight power away from the Department of Public Utilities and create a new Office of Transit Safety. The MBTA later planned to add 644 more safety-related workers.

== Improvement ==
By late 2024, there were early signs that the reforms were starting to work. More than two years after a federal investigation that outlined the problems of the subway system, data indicated that the MBTA has been starting to improve, as its new leaders tried to earn back the public's trust and reputation through multiple improvements in the safety features of its subways. Since 2023, the agency has invested more than $480 million to improve system safety in partnership with the FTA.
