= Massachusetts District Court =

U.S. District Court

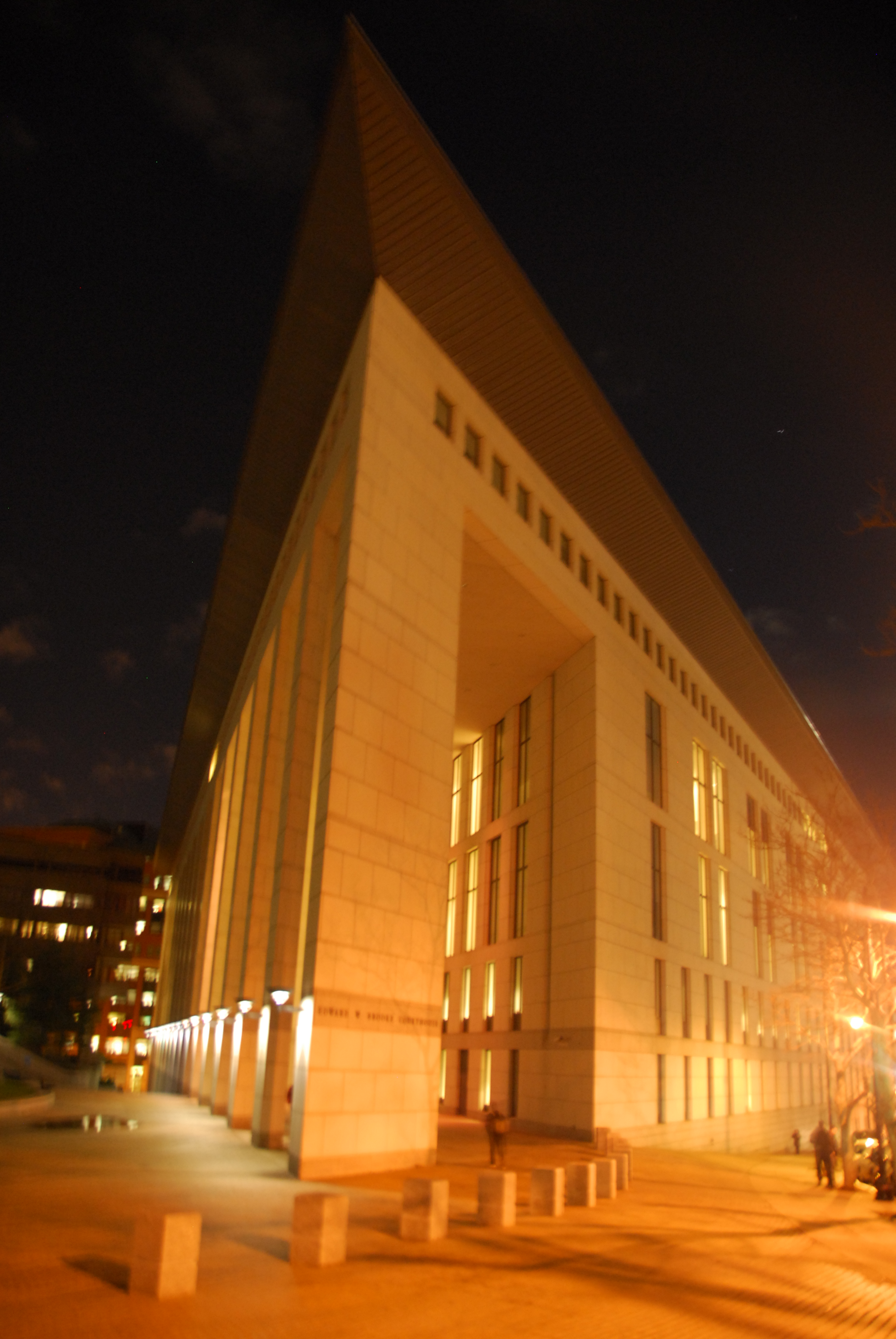
Brooke courthouse in Boston houses the Administrative Office of the District Court Department

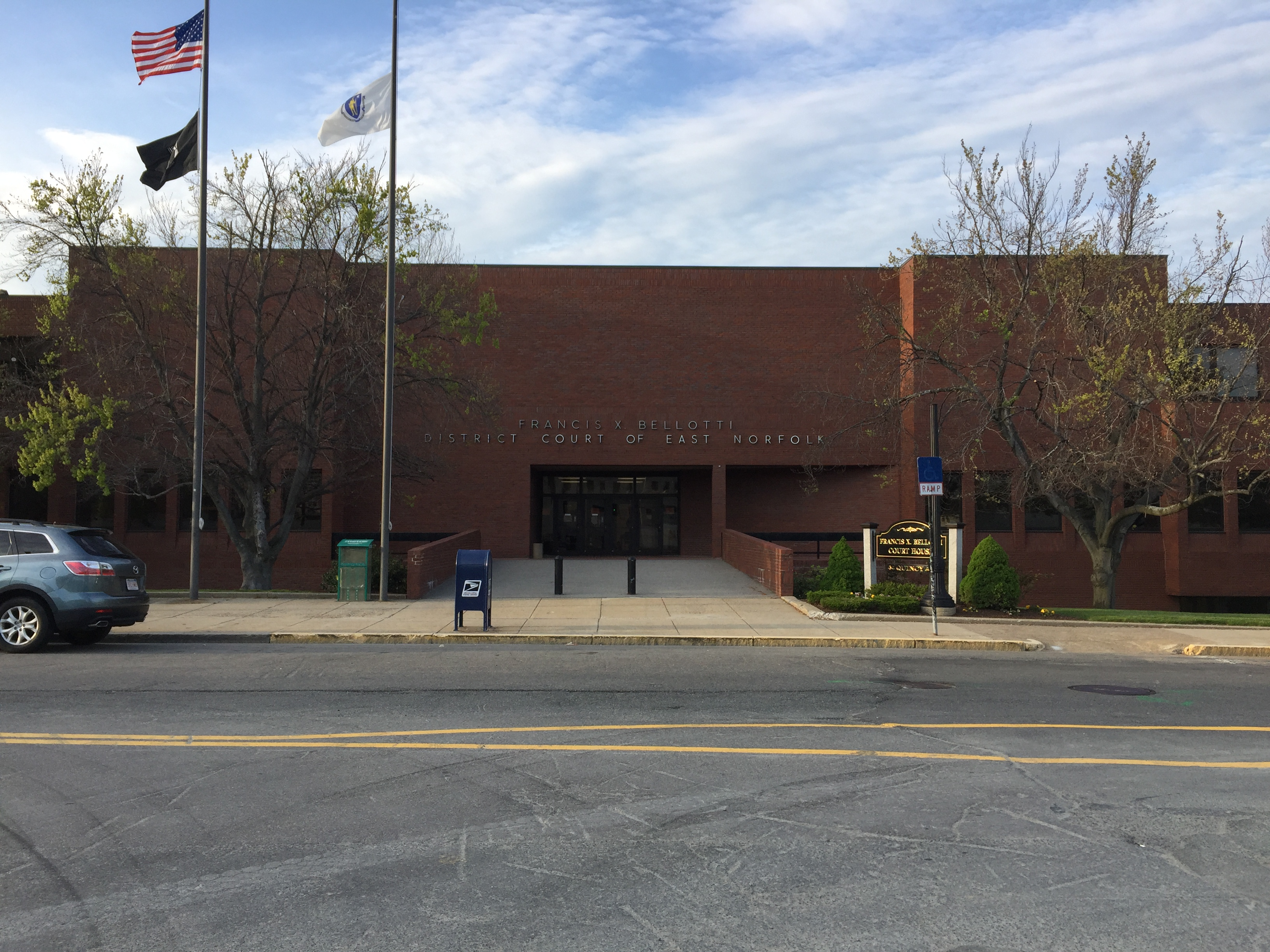
Francis X. Bellotti Courthouse in Quincy

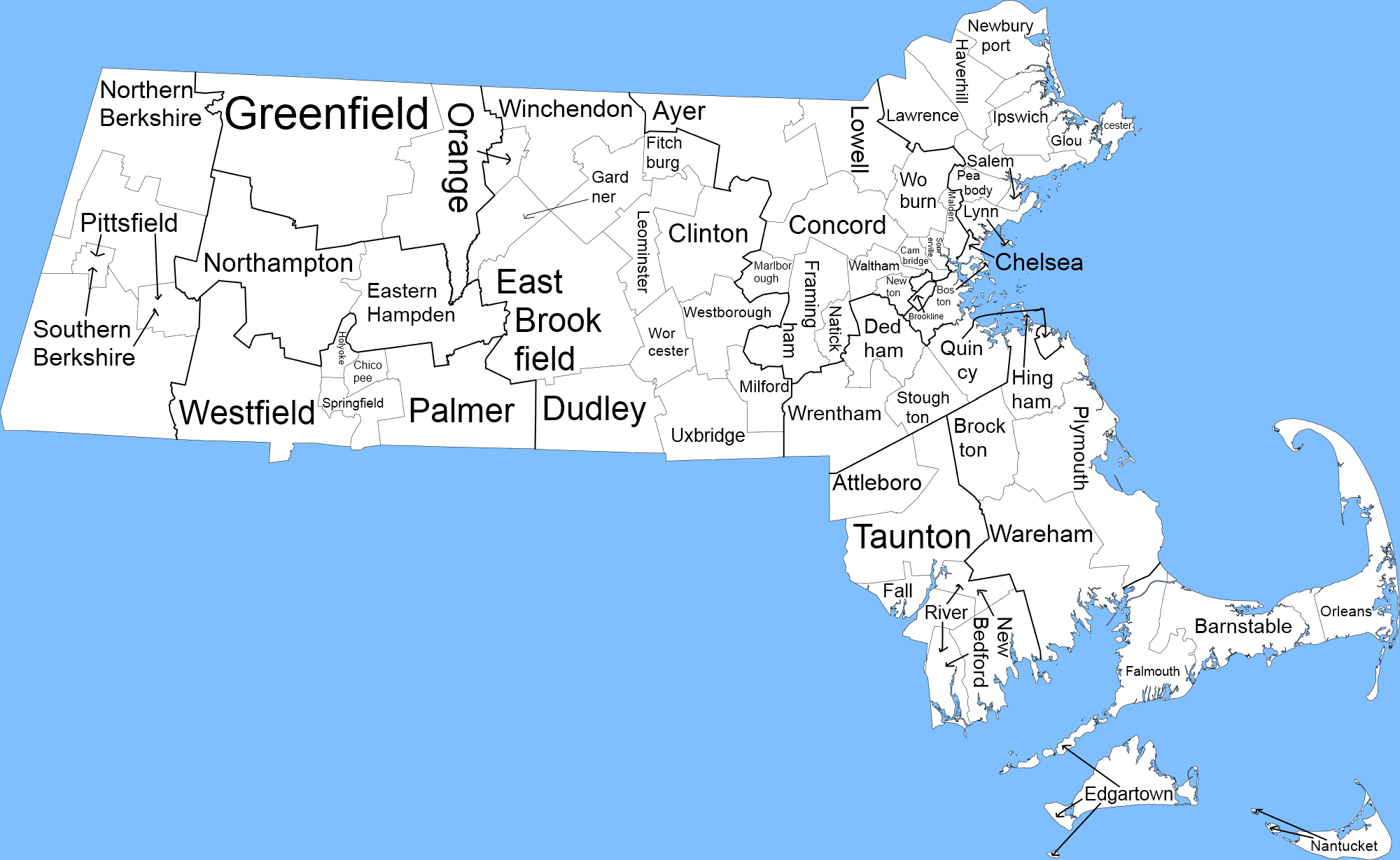
Massachusetts judicial district map

The Massachusetts District Court (also known as the District Court Department of the Trial Court) is a trial court in Massachusetts that hears a wide range of criminal, civil, housing, juvenile, mental health, and other types of cases.

District Court criminal jurisdiction extends to all felonies punishable by a sentence up to five years, and many other specific felonies with greater potential penalties; all misdemeanors; and all violations of city and town ordinances and by-laws. In felonies not within District Court final jurisdiction, the District Court conducts probable cause hearings to determine if a defendant should be bound over to the Superior Court. District Court magistrates conduct hearings to issue criminal complaints and arrest warrants, and to determine whether there is probable cause to detain persons arrested without a warrant. Both judges and magistrates issue criminal and administrative search warrants.

In civil matters, District Court judges conduct both jury and jury-waived trials, and determine with finality any matter in which the likelihood of recovery does not exceed $25,000. The District Court also tries small claims anticipated to involve up to $7,000 (initially tried to a magistrate, with a defense right of appeal either to a judge or to a jury). Fifteen of its judges serve on the Appellate Division, an appellate tribunal with published opinions that is organized in three geographical districts, and sits in three-judge panels, to review questions of law that arise in civil cases.

The District Court's civil jurisdiction also includes many specialized proceedings: inquests; summary process (evictions); supplementary process (enforcement of money judgments); abuse prevention restraining orders; mental health matters (including involuntary civil commitments and medication orders, and supervision of criminal defendants committed for mental observation or because incompetent to stand trial or after an insanity acquittal); appeals from certain administrative agencies (involving, for example, firearms licenses or unemployment compensation); civil motor vehicle infractions (tried initially to a magistrate, with right of appeal to a judge); equitable injunctions (exercising specialized equity jurisdiction in all counties, plus general equity jurisdiction in small claims, summary process and civil money damage actions); and other miscellaneous civil matters.

== See also ==
- Courts of Massachusetts
- Judiciary of Massachusetts
- Government of Massachusetts
- Law of Massachusetts
- Same-sex marriage in Massachusetts
