= Edward M. Lambert Jr. =

American politician

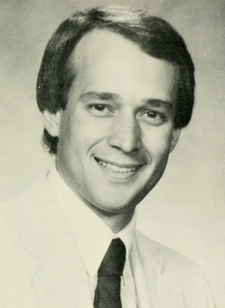

Commissioner of the Department of Conservation and Recreation
- In office 2011–2013
- Preceded by: Rick Sullivan
- Succeeded by: Jack Murray

Mayor of Fall River, Massachusetts
- In office 1996 – Oct. 26, 2007
- Preceded by: John R. Mitchell
- Succeeded by: William F. Whitty (Acting)

Member of the Massachusetts House of Representatives from the 8th Bristol District
- In office 1989–1996
- Preceded by: Charles E. Silvia
- Succeeded by: Michael Rodrigues

Fall River School Committee
- In office 1980–1989

Personal details
- Born: March 8, 1958 (age 68) Fall River, Massachusetts
- Party: Democratic
- Education: Southeastern Massachusetts University; Bridgewater State College
- Occupation: Politician; Civil servant

Edward M. Lambert Jr. (born March 8, 1958, in Fall River, Massachusetts) is an American politician and government official who currently served as vice chancellor for government relations and public affairs at the University of Massachusetts Boston.

He previously served as a member of the Fall River, Massachusetts School Committee from 1980 to 1989, the Massachusetts House of Representatives from 1989 to 1996, Mayor of Fall River from 1996 to 2007, and Commissioner of the Massachusetts Department of Conservation and Recreation from 2011 to 2013.

Outside politics Lambert served as the director of University of Massachusetts Dartmouth's Urban Initiative from 2007 to 2011.

== Early life and education ==
Lambert was born March 8, 1958, in Fall River, Massachusetts. He obtained a bachelor's degree in psychology from Southeastern Massachusetts University (now the University of Massachusetts Dartmouth) in 1981, and a master's degree in education and counseling from Bridgewater State University in 1984.

== Political career ==
Lambert, a member on Fall River's Democratic City Committee, was first elected to the nonpartisan Fall River School Committee in 1979; he was reelected every two years for a total of five terms. In 1988, Lambert challenged and defeated State Rep. Charles E. Silvia (D-8th Bristol) in the Democratic primary for that office and was unopposed in the general election.

=== State representative ===
In 1990, Lambert was re-elected, defeating Republican Thomas Costello and again defeating former Representative Charles Silvia (running as an independent) with over 73% of the vote. He was re-elected in 1992 and 1994 without opposition.

=== Mayor of Fall River ===
In 1995, Lambert entered the race for Mayor of Fall River, after incumbent Mayor John R. Mitchell decided not to seek reelection. Following the September preliminary, Lambert defeated former City Councillor Cathy Ann Viveiros with almost 65% of the vote in the November election. He was re-elected in 1997 against token opposition, and defeated City Council President William F. Whitty (who would succeed him as Acting Mayor) in 1999. In 2001, he was re-elected to a fourth term against local restaurateur Paul R. Viveiros, which centered largely around the latter's attempt to operate an adult entertainment club within city limits, which was opposed by city government. Lambert's most narrow win came in 2003, winning by only 903 votes against local Portuguese language translator, F. George Jacome, who was seen as having stronger ties to that large constituency. After a term of outreach, as well as added support due to his fight against attempts by Hess Corporation to locate an LNG facility in the city, Lambert defeated Jacome with 61% of the vote in a rematch of their previous race.

In 2007, Lambert declined to run for reelection, resigning from office on October 26 to take a position as Director of UMass Dartmouth's Urban Initiative. The timing of his resignation was motivated in part by the fact that the Fall River Charter allows for the City Council President (Whitty at the time) to temporarily fill a mayoral vacancy. As Whitty was a candidate for mayor, the potential of his serving as mayor was considered an unfair advantage by Lambert, though this was moot after Whitty's defeat in the preliminary election.

== Personal life ==
Lambert was married for twenty years to Mary (Ciullo) Lambert, until her death on Christmas Day 2005, less than one month after his final reelection campaign; he has one son, James. Lambert remarried in 2008 to Ava Assad and they have a son, Max.
