= Massachusetts Executive Office of Energy and Environmental Affairs =

Cabinet-level agency in Massachusetts

The Massachusetts Executive Office of Energy and Environmental Affairs (EOEEA) is a Cabinet-level agency under the Governor of Massachusetts. EOEEA is responsible for promoting efficient energy use throughout the Commonwealth while protecting and preserving Massachusetts' natural environment.

The agency is under the supervision and control of the Secretary of Energy and Environmental Affairs, who is appointed by the Governor.

== Organization ==
As of 2023, the Secretary of Energy and Environmental Affairs is Rebecca Tepper, who was appointed by Governor Maura Healey. Former Secretaries have included Rick Sullivan and Ian Bowles.

The office is composed of several constituent departments, which are responsible for the administration of the office's work. Each department is headed by a director, who is appointed by the governor.

- Office of the Secretary
- Department of Environmental Protection
- Department of Fish and Game
- Department of Agricultural Resources
- Department of Conservation and Recreation
- Department of Public Utilities
- Department of Energy Resources
- Office of Law Enforcement, more commonly known as the Massachusetts Environmental Police
- Massachusetts Office of Technical Assistance

== See also ==
- List of state and territorial fish and wildlife management agencies in the United States
