= Rick Sullivan =

American politician

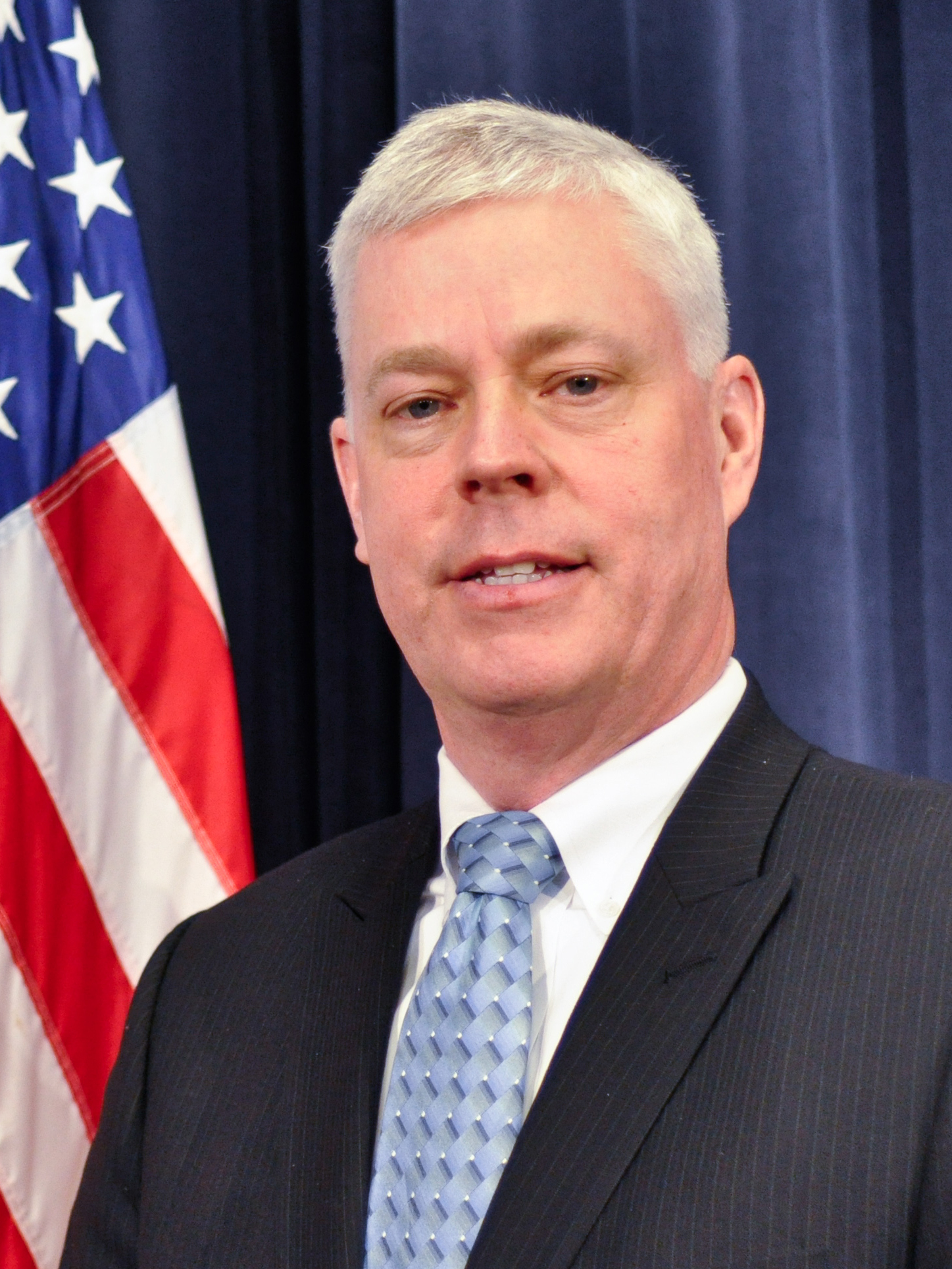

Member of the Westfield City Council, At-large
- Incumbent
- Assumed office January 6, 2020
- Preceded by: Matthew Emmershy
- In office 1990–1993

Chief of Staff to the Governor of Massachusetts
- In office June 9, 2014 – January 8, 2015
- Governor: Deval Patrick
- Preceded by: Brendan Ryan
- Succeeded by: Steve Kadish

Massachusetts Secretary of Energy and Environmental Affairs
- In office January 5, 2011 – June 9, 2014
- Governor: Deval Patrick
- Preceded by: Ian Bowles
- Succeeded by: Maeve Vallely Bartlett

Commissioner of the Department of Conservation and Recreation
- In office May 23, 2007 – January 5, 2011
- Preceded by: Stephen Burrington
- Succeeded by: Jack Murray (Acting); Edward M. Lambert, Jr.

Mayor of Westfield
- In office January 3, 1994 – May 23, 2007
- Preceded by: George Varelas
- Succeeded by: Charles Medeiros (Acting)

Personal details
- Born: January 18, 1959 (age 67) Great Barrington, Massachusetts, U.S.
- Party: Democratic
- Spouse: Lisa Sullivan
- Children: 3
- Education: Bates College (BA); Western New England University (JD)

Richard K. "Rick" Sullivan, Jr. (born January 18, 1959) is an American politician who served as chief of staff to Governor Deval Patrick from 2014 to 2015. Before assuming the office, Sullivan was the former secretary of energy and environmental affairs of the Commonwealth of Massachusetts and former mayor of Westfield, Massachusetts.

Sullivan served as Mayor of Westfield from 1994 until 2007 when he was appointed commissioner of the Department of Conservation and Recreation. Under his leadership, the DCR completed several large-scale capital improvements, including a two-year, $21.3 million project at Mount Greylock State Reservation and a $9 million renovation of the visitor center at Georges Island in Boston. In 2011 he succeeded the departing Ian Bowles as Secretary of Energy and Environmental Affairs. In this position, Sullivan was in charge of implementing Governor Deval Patrick's solar, wind, biofuel, and energy efficiency initiatives as well as overseeing land-preservation efforts and the implementation of environmental laws and regulations. On May 22, Governor Patrick appointed Sullivan as his chief of staff for the remainder of his administration.

Sullivan is a graduate of Westfield High School and holds degrees from Bates College and Western New England School of Law.
