= Ian Bowles =

American environmentalist, businessman, politician, and political aide

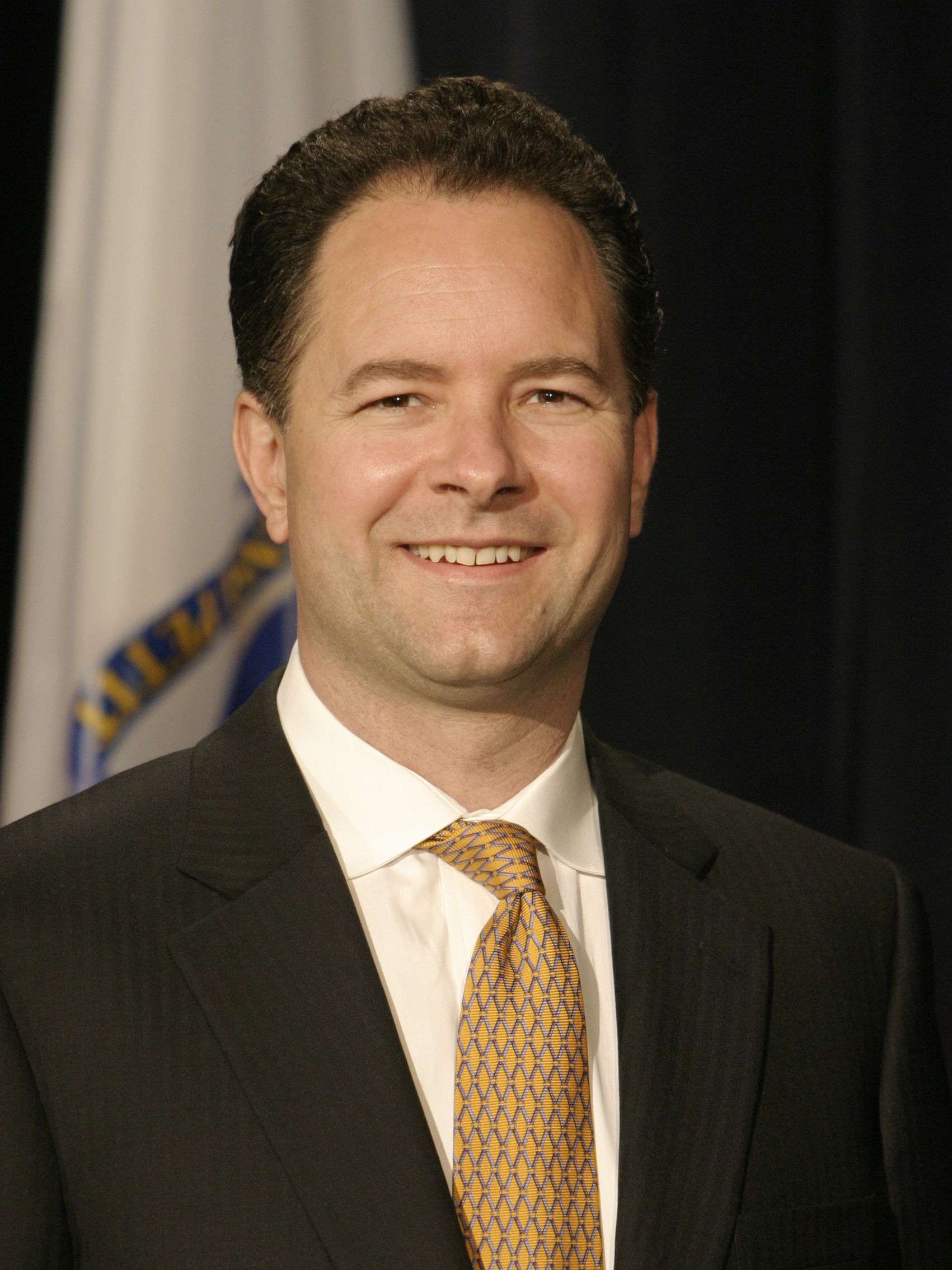
- Bowles circa 2007

Massachusetts Secretary of Energy and Environmental Affairs
- In office January 4, 2007 – January 5, 2011
- Governor: Deval Patrick
- Preceded by: Robert W. Golledge, Jr.
- Succeeded by: Rick Sullivan

Personal details
- Born: 1966 (age 59–60) Woods Hole, Massachusetts, U.S.
- Party: Democratic
- Spouse: Hannah Riley (m. 2003)
- Education: Harvard University (BA); University of Oxford (MLitt)

Ian A. Bowles (born c. 1966) is an American environmentalist, businessman, politician, and political aide who served as Massachusetts Secretary of Energy and Environmental Affairs from 2007 to 2011. Bowles is a native of Woods Hole, Massachusetts, and a graduate of Falmouth High School and Harvard College. He also has a master's degree from Oxford College and an honorary doctorate from Emerson College. He resides in Dover, Massachusetts, with his wife Hannah Riley Bowles and their two children.

== Background ==
Bowles began his career in politics as a legislative aide to Congresswoman Claudine Schneider. After Schneider left office, Bowles became a policy analyst and later Vice President at Conservation International. He played a key role in creation of the Central Suriname Nature Reserve, a 4 million acre park that is one of the largest tropical forest protected areas in the world. Bowles was co-editor of Footprints in the Jungle: Natural Resource Industries, Infrastructure, and Biodiversity Conservation (Oxford University Press).

In 1996 he was a Democratic candidate for United States Representative in Massachusetts's 10th congressional district. He finished in third place, with 22 percent of the vote, in the four-candidate primary behind Bill Delahunt and Philip W. Johnston.

From 1999 to 2001, Bowles served under President Bill Clinton as senior director of global environmental affairs at the National Security Council and as associate director of the White House Council on Environmental Quality. Clinton also appointed Bowles to the Enterprise for the Americas Board.

He then served as a senior research fellow at Harvard University's Belfer Center for Science and International Affairs (part of the John F. Kennedy School of Government), and as a senior advisor to the Gordon and Betty Moore Foundation, a $4 billion U.S. charitable foundation set up by the founder of Intel Corporation and his wife.

From 2003 to 2006, Bowles was president of the Massachusetts Institute for a New Commonwealth (MassINC), a nonpartisan think tank based in Boston, and publisher of CommonWealth magazine.

On December 15, 2006, Governor-elect Deval Patrick named Bowles Secretary of Energy and Environmental Affairs. Previously known as the Executive Office of Environmental Affairs, the Executive Office of Energy and Environmental Affairs was created by Cabinet restructuring legislation that took effect April 11, 2007, adding oversight of the two energy regulatory agencies, the Department of Energy Resources and the Department of Public Utilities. Massachusetts was the first state in the nation to combine oversight of energy and environment into one cabinet agency.

As Secretary, Bowles helped guide the passing of the Green Communities Act and four other major pieces of energy and environmental legislation into law in 2008. These bills put Massachusetts at the top of state rankings in the American Council for an Energy-Efficient Economy's energy efficiency scorecard in 2011, where it has stayed ever since. Under the Global Warming Solutions Act, Bowles set the most stringent greenhouse gas reduction requirement in the nation at 25 percent below 1990 levels by 2020. Bowles also oversaw the first state ocean management plan, as required by the Oceans Act. Under the state's Green Jobs Act, Massachusetts established a new quasi-government authority, the Massachusetts Clean Energy Center, to promote renewable energy and clean energy job creation, of which Bowles was its first chairman.

Bowles was at the center of key regulatory decisions related to Cape Wind, which was the nation's first proposed offshore wind energy development, having approved the project's state environmental review in 2007 and chairing the state energy siting board that gave the project its key permit. Bowles stepped down as secretary in 2011.

In 2011, Bowles co-founded and is a managing director of an investment management company, WindSail Capital Group LLC, which lends funds to clean energy companies. He is also a senior director at Albright Stonebridge Group, with former Clinton administration colleagues Madeleine Albright and Carol Browner. He is a corporate board member for several public and private clean energy companies.

In 2008, John Podesta recommended Bowles as a candidate to be administrator of the U.S. Environmental Protection Agency under President Barack Obama.
