= Massachusetts Department of Early Education and Care =

The Department of Early Education and Care (ECC), or sometimes referred by former name the Department of Early Education, is an infant/toddler, preschool and family care state education agency for the Commonwealth of Massachusetts. As found under the oversight of the Governor's Executive Office of Education. The department is led by its own commissioner, who manages the daily operations of the department, as well as a twelve-member departmental Board of Directors, itself chaired by the State's Secretary of Education, all of whom are appointed by the Governor of the Commonwealth and implements policies and goals for the department.

The agency has its headquarters in the Financial District in downtown Boston. Plus five further regional offices sited across the Commonwealth. (As of 2025 regionally in: Lawrence, Quincy, Springfield, Taunton, and Worcester.) Other departmental precepts and mandates of Mass. DEEC involve the areas of: Adoption Agency Licensing, Child Care Resources (and licensing), Children's Trust Fund (with its focus on providing statewide child abuse prevention programs through the elementary schools and licensing of daycare providers).

== History ==
=== Early Childhood Resource Centers in Massachusetts ===
The program started in 1991 as the Early Education Department, who still runs and funds this grant today. The purpose of these centers is to facilitate the availability and accessibility of early childhood materials and resources statewide. Partnering with libraries has enabled broader access for parents, schools, child care agencies, and other entities involved with early education care and intervention.

These Resource Centers provide education materials that range from professional resource books, parenting books, videos & DVDs, teaching curriculum kits, themed picture books, big books, and many other items that are available for borrowing at no charge. Throughout the school year there are also teacher trainings available where professionals can earn early education credits or professional development hours. These trainings vary by location.

As of 2017, the Cambridge, Falmouth, Haverhill, Norfolk, and Springfield Public Library are the five Early Childhood Resource Centers in Massachusetts.

The DEEC also offers a variety of early childhood education opportunities, including assistance with Head Start & Early Head Start. In partnership with the WGBH Educational Foundation and the National Science Foundation, DEEC launched an online early-learning video resource web portal for families.

== See also ==
- Education in Massachusetts
- History of education in Massachusetts
- Department of Elementary and Secondary Education
- Child care
- Compensatory education
- Early childhood education
- Family-centered care
- Early childhood development
- Head Start Program
- Pretend play
- Playwork
