= List of law schools in Massachusetts =

This is a list of law schools in Massachusetts, arranged in alphabetical order.

Law School	City/Town	Founded
Boston College Law School	Newton	1929
Boston University School of Law	Boston	1872
Harvard Law School	Cambridge	1817
Massachusetts School of Law	Andover	1988
New England Law Boston	Boston	1908
Northeastern University School of Law	Boston	1898
Suffolk University Law School	Boston	1906
University of Massachusetts School of Law	Dartmouth	2010
Western New England University School of Law	Springfield	1919

In addition, Tufts University has a school of Law and Diplomacy, which, besides offering M.A. and Ph.D. degrees in Law and Diplomacy (international affairs), offers an LL.M. in international law.

School Name	City/Town	Founded
Fletcher School of Law and Diplomacy	Medford	1933

== Former law schools ==
Law School	City/Town	Founded	Closed
Southern New England School of Law	Dartmouth	1981	2010
