= Massachusetts Department of Environmental Protection =

Massachusetts state agency

The Massachusetts Department of Environmental Protection is an agency in the Executive Office of Energy and Environmental Affairs of the Commonwealth of Massachusetts, responsible for protecting the environment in the state. Its areas of responsibility include preventing pollution of air, water, and ground; protecting wetlands; waste and recycling issues; regulating hazardous materials; and reducing climate change.

== See also ==
- Climate change in Massachusetts
