= Massachusetts Department of Elementary and Secondary Education =

Department of education

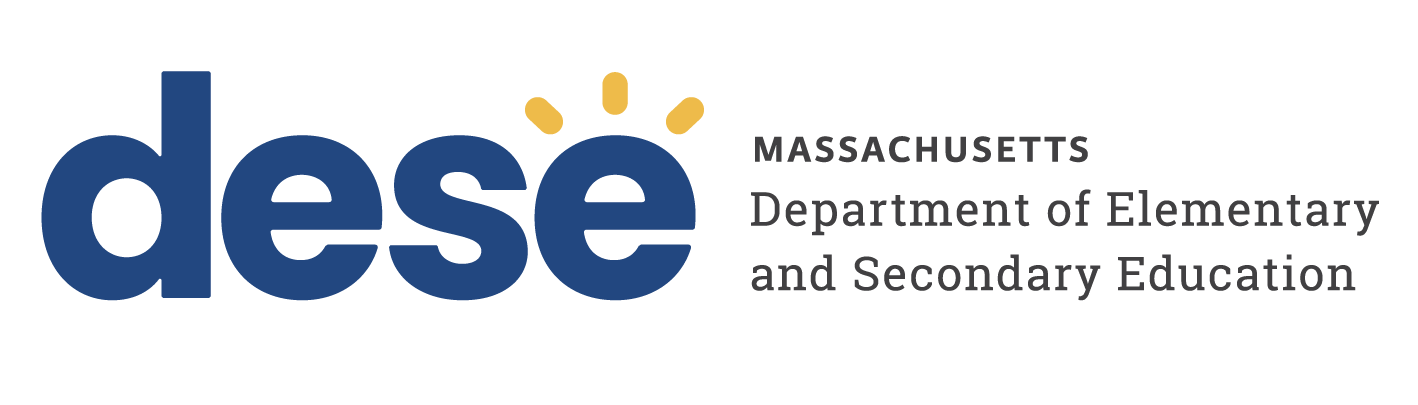

Department overview
- Formed: December 11, 1789; 236 years ago
- Jurisdiction: Commonwealth of Massachusetts
- Headquarters: 135 Santilli Highway Everett, MA 02149
- Department executive: Pedro Martinez, Commissioner of elementary and secondary education
- Website: www.doe.mass.edu

The Massachusetts Department of Elementary and Secondary Education (DESE), or sometimes referred by former name the Massachusetts Department of Education, is a Pre-K through Grade 12 state education agency for the Commonwealth of Massachusetts. As found under the oversight of the Governor's Executive Office of Education, the DESE is identified by the U.S. Department of Education as the preeminent public education department for Massachusetts. The agency has its department headquarters in Everett.

== History ==
=== Governance and legal provisions ===
As outlined by the legal framework of the General Laws, the Departmental Board's Legal Authority is outlined under M.G.L. Chapter 15, Section 1E. It is governed by the Massachusetts Board of Elementary and Secondary Education. DESE maintain's the Commonwealth of Massachusetts' Office of Educator Licensure for public education professionals under the Pre-K, elementary and secondary schooling levels.

The department is led by its own commissioner, who manages the daily operations of the department, as well as a twelve-member departmental Board of Directors, itself chaired by the state's Secretary of Education, all of whom are appointed by the Governor of the Commonwealth and implements policies and goals for the department.

== See also ==
- Education in Massachusetts
- Massachusetts Board of Education
- Massachusetts Comprehensive Assessment System
- Massachusetts Tests for Educator Licensure
- Massachusetts Department of Early Education and Care
- List of school districts in Massachusetts
- List of high schools in Massachusetts
- School leaving qualification
- New England Association of Schools and Colleges
