= Law enforcement in Massachusetts =

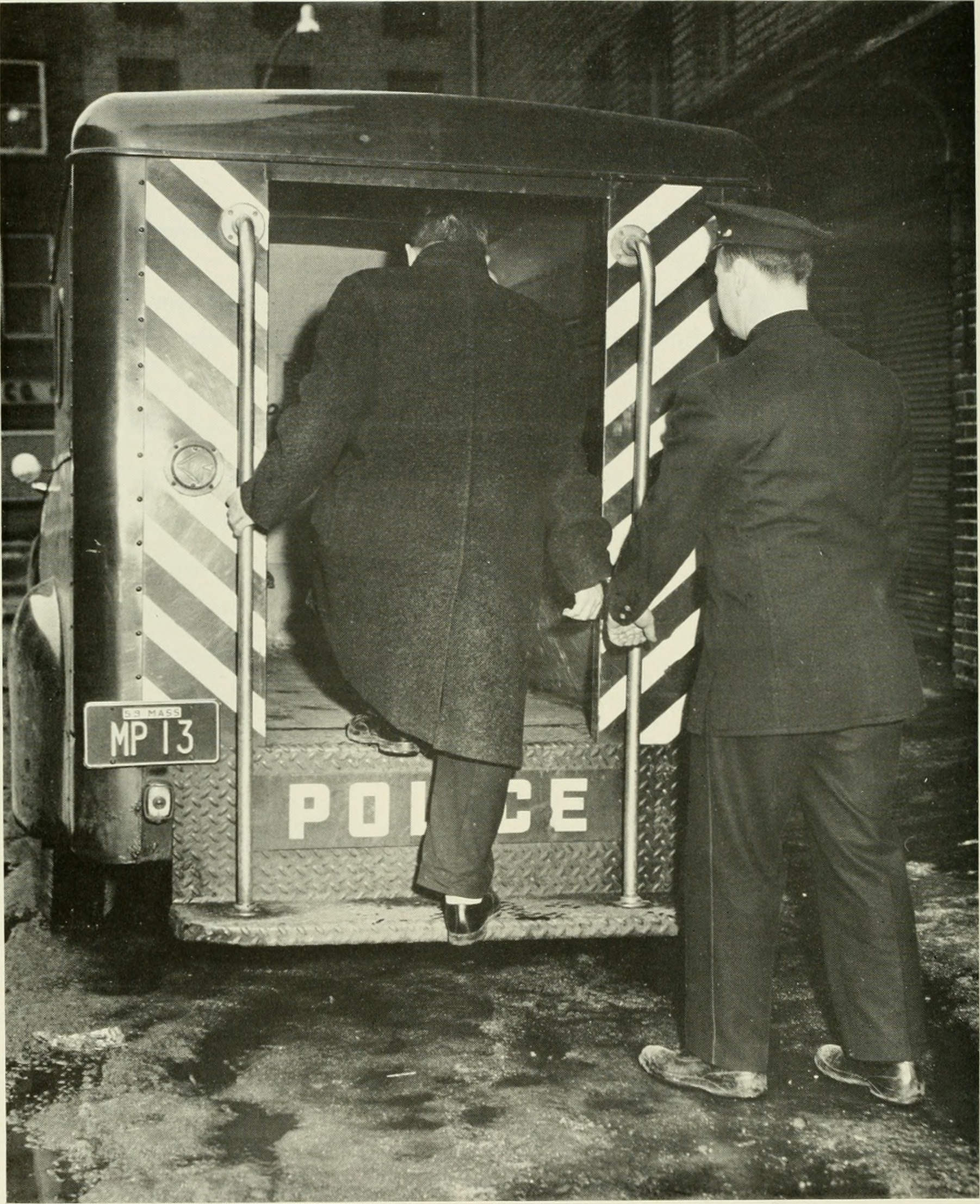
A historical photograph from an annual report of the Police Commissioner for the City of Boston

Many municipalities of Massachusetts have their own police departments, as do many colleges and universities. Though most county governments have been abolished, each county still has a Sheriff's Department which operates jails and correctional facilities and service of process within the county.

The Massachusetts State Police has statewide jurisdiction, including full criminal law enforcement, Highway Patrol, traffic enforcement, investigation, special air, marine and tactical response. It shares concurrent jurisdiction with municipal and institutional departments and has primary jurisdiction in towns that have no local police force. State police divisions ("Troops") are dedicated to the Massachusetts Turnpike and Logan International Airport, and since 1992 the state police has had primary responsibility for the Massachusetts State House, facilities of the Registry of Motor Vehicles and DCR parks. While State Police investigators have jurisdiction to investigate all crimes anywhere in the commonwealth, the Boston, Springfield, Worcester and Pittsfield police departments have been designated by the local district attorneys to investigate homicides under their direction.

Though fully deputized in 175 cities and towns, the Massachusetts Bay Transportation Authority Police has primary responsibility for MBTA facilities and commuter railroads statewide. It also shares enforcement duties (such as writing tickets for parking in bus stops) with local police forces and state police, especially in remote areas and on Massport property, which is policed by the Massport Police. The Massachusetts Environmental Police is also independent of the State Police.The horse mounted Boston Park Rangers patrols the hubs parks.

The US Coast Guard Station in Boston provides law enforcement services in the ocean surrounding Massachusetts. Harbormasters in the area enforce the law in Massachusetts harbors.

Massachusetts Army National Guard has reserve CID agents who can investigate breaches of military and federal law. At the same time the Massachusetts Fire Marshall has detectives who investigate suspicious fires and explosions. District Attorney offices often have officers or troopers assigned to them to assist with prosecutions.

Railroad police forces also have authority on railroad property. Railroad and ferry company employees may be appointed as special state police officers under Massachusetts state law, with jurisdiction on company property and vehicles. Federal regulations extend the authority granted by one state to a railroad police officer to all the states in which that railroad has property.

== See also ==
- List of law enforcement agencies in Massachusetts
