= Massachusetts Tests for Educator Licensure =

The Massachusetts Tests for Educator Licensure (MTEL) program was initiated by the Massachusetts Department of Education in 1998. It is part of a statewide education reform initiative for educators seeking pre-kindergarten to Grade 12 licenses. The MTEL program includes a test of communication and literacy skills as well as tests of subject matter knowledge. The tests are designed to ensure that Massachusetts educators can communicate adequately with students, parents/guardians, and other educators and that they are knowledgeable in the subject matter of the license sought. The MTEL program was expanded in November 2004 to include tests for candidates seeking vocational technical and adult basic education licenses.

The MTEL is developed, administered, and scored by National Evaluation Systems, Inc. (NES), which is now known as the Evaluation Systems group of Pearson Education. Tests are scored on a criterion-based system, where examinees must attain a certain score based on standards established by the state. Constructed (written & oral) components of the tests are scored using a focused holistic scoring model (similar to holistic grading). Like regular holistic scoring, responses are viewed for their overall quality, not just for individual mistakes. However this is done according to specific criteria that the state has established (i.e., grammar, support, etc.). These criteria vary by test and assignment.

It is accepted in a few other states as a credential for teaching. The MTEL is a unique set of tests, whereas all other states in New England use the Praxis test, which have been adopted by 40 other states. A wide variety of MTEL assessments are available, including: Academically Advanced (52) Adult Basic Education (55) Bilingual Education (79) Biology (66) Business (19) Chemistry (67) Chinese (Mandarin) (29) Dance (46) Digital Literacy and Computer Science (71) Early Childhood (72) Earth and Space Science (74) English (61) English as a Second Language (54) Foundations of Reading (190) French (26) General Curriculum (03)—current test General Curriculum (78)—future test General Science (64) German (27) Health/Family and Consumer Sciences (21) History/Social Science (73) Italian (30) Latin and Classical Humanities (15) Mathematics (Elementary) (68) Mathematics (Middle School) (65) Mathematics (Secondary) (63) Mathematics/Science (Middle School) (77) Middle School Humanities (50)—current test Middle School Humanities (76)—future test Music (16) Physical Education (22) Physics (69) Portuguese (32) Reading Specialist (62) Russian (31) Sheltered English Immersion (56) Spanish (28) Speech (44) Technology/Engineering (70) Theater (45) Visual Art (17)

== Design ==
The MTEL is designed to align with state-regulated expectations of subject matter familiarity and state curriculum frameworks. Most MTELs contain sub-areas that correspond to the broader academic subjects, i.e., the General Curriculum Multi-Subject test includes various sub-areas such as language arts, history and social science, etc. Each sub-area also contains various objectives corresponding to more specific academic areas. These objectives are reviewed and approved by panels, following a review of state regulations, state-level curriculum frameworks, and surveys of both teacher candidates and university-level education faculty. The sub-areas determine the weight of each area in score calculation. The state also convenes a bias review committee to assist the advisory committee in assessing test items for bias. The bias committee reviews both content and language for topics and/or wording that may disadvantage certain demographics of teacher candidates. All concerns raised by the bias committee are submitted to the advisory committee, which is required to address all issues raised by the bias committee.
