= Massachusetts Office of Technical Assistance =

The Massachusetts Office of Technical Assistance (OTA) is a Massachusetts state agency that provides support and guidance to businesses dealing with potentially toxic materials. The OTA was established in 1989 and is located within the Executive Office of Energy and Environmental Affairs in Boston.

== Purpose ==
Established in 1989 following the Toxics Use Reduction Act, the agency's mandate is to promote safe handling and reduction of hazardous materials within Massachusetts businesses. The OTA provides free and confidential technical assistance to manufacturing facilities, companies, and businesses that use, store, and/or manufacture toxic or hazardous substances and chemicals. The OTA provides assistance on issues relating to pollution prevention, air emissions compliance, chemicals usage, hazardous waste management, energy efficiency, water conservation, wastewater management, plant operations and maintenance, and record keeping.

== See also ==
- Massachusetts Toxics Use Reduction Institute
