= Massachusetts Appellate Tax Board =

Quasi-judicial agency in Massachusetts

The Massachusetts Appellate Tax Board (ATB) is a quasi-judicial agency within the Commonwealth of Massachusetts' Office of the Governor. Though part of the executive branch, the ATB is "not subject to its control in the conduct of its adjudicatory functions". The Massachusetts ATB hears and decides cases on appeal from state and local taxing authorities.

It was established by the Massachusetts General Court in 1929 to relieve the Superior Court of its large volume of tax appeals and to provide taxpayers with a less expensive and more expedient means of appeal. The ATB is the locus of the overall system of revenue production for the Commonwealth.

Ninety percent of the petitions filed at the ATB are appeals of local property taxes. The remaining cases are appeals by taxpayers regarding all state taxes, including the income tax, sales, and use taxes, the bank excise tax, the corporate excise tax, and others. The court sits at the Government Center in Boston, Massachusetts.

== ATB membership ==
Chair Mark J. DeFrancisco

Commissioners

- Patricia M. Good
- Steven G. Elliott
- Patricia A. Metzer
- Nicholas D. Bernier
