= Massachusetts Environmental Police =

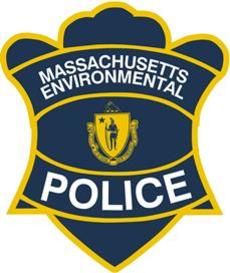
- Patch of the Massachusetts Environmental Police

Jurisdictional structure
- Operations jurisdiction: Massachusetts, US
- Area: 10,565 square miles (27,360 km^{2})
- Population: 6,811,779 (2016 est.)
- Legal jurisdiction: Commonwealth of Massachusetts
- Governing body: Commonwealth of Massachusetts
- General nature: Civilian police

Operational structure
- Headquarters: Boston, Massachusetts
- Agency executive: Colonel John Monaghan, Director

Website
- https://www.mass.gov/orgs/massachusetts-environmental-police

The Massachusetts Environmental Police is a Massachusetts, US, state government law enforcement agency, which is the primary enforcement agency of Massachusetts's boating and recreation vehicle laws and regulations and is responsible for registering boats, off-highway vehicles and snowmobiles in Massachusetts. The agency is also responsible for the enforcement of fish and game laws, including commercial and recreational harvesting of the living marine resources along the state's coastline.

== Mission ==
The mission of the Office of Law Enforcement, more commonly known as the Massachusetts Environmental Police, is to protect the environment and natural resources of the Commonwealth of Massachusetts through enforcement, education, and public outreach. The Office is further charged with protecting the health, safety, and individual rights of the public and preserving our environment for future generations.

== Leadership ==
The Massachusetts Environmental Police is led by Colonel John Monaghan of Danvers, MA. He replaced Colonel Chris Mason who was appointed in 2024 in an interim capacity.

The agency is under the supervision and control of the Secretary of Energy and Environmental Affairs, who is appointed by the Governor. The current Secretary of EOEEA is Rebecca Tepper.

== History ==
=== Conservation laws in the 1600s ===
Massachusetts has had a long history of protecting its natural resources. Some of the earliest hunting and fishing laws date back to 1627 when the Colony of New Plymouth created a law that declared hunting, fowling, and fishing shall be free. The Massachusetts Bay Colony also declared hunting and fishing to be free in 1641.

"Every inhabitant who is an house-holder shall have free fishing and fowling in any great ponds, bays, coves, and rivers so far as the sea ebbs and flows within the precinct of the town where they dwell unless the freeman of the same town or general court have otherwise appropriated them."

The colony also created many laws that paid bounties for killing wolves. In 1630, the colony created a law that paid one shilling to any colonist who killed a wolf. In 1640, the Massachusetts Bay Colony passed a law which gave forty shillings to any man who killed a wolf with hounds. Many colonists hunted wolves because forty shillings was a sizeable bounty in 1640. The 1640 bounty was equivalent to 27 days of a laborer's pay.

"Early Massachusetts laws encouraged residents to keep dogs, such as mastiffs and greyhounds, to use in hunting wolves and authorized town governments to use public funds to purchase and keep wolf-hunting dogs. Towns were also required to set out and bait specific numbers of wolf traps. Any town that neglected its obligation to trap wolves was assessed a fine."

In 1636, a law was created which stated that no guns or iron traps could be used near the highway. During the colonial period, alewives were a very important fish used for food and fertilizer. Plymouth colony created some of the country's earliest fishing regulations to protect the alewives. In 1645, the colony created a law that prohibited the use of nets to catch alewives in the Sandwich river with a fine of ten pounds. In 1661, the Plymouth Colony banned any foreigner without permission from fishing on Cape Cod. In 1668, to protect cod, haddock, and pollock during spawning the Massachusetts Bay Colony banned all fishing in December and January. Fishing of mackerel was also banned in May and June. The penalty for fishing during the spawning period was 5 shillings per barrel.

In 1670, the position of water bailiff was created to regulate the Cape Cod Fisheries. Thomas Paine was appointed as the first water bailiff. The law required residents of the colony to pay a duty of six pence per barrel of mackerel caught. The duty on mackerel caught by foreigners was one shilling and 6 pence per barrel.

=== Water bailiff oath ===
"You shall faithfully serve in the office of Water Bailiff in the Jurisdiction of New Plymouth and shall carefully observe such orders of Court as concerns your said office with special reference unto the improvement thereof at Cape Cod and places adjacent. You shall faithfully discharge the trust imposed upon you in demanding and receiving whatsoever shall be due unto the Colony by such fish as shall be there taken; and shall seasonably give in a true account thereof unto the Treasurer yearly."

In 1672, a new law was created which gave the water bailiff authority to seize any fish caught by a vessel in Cape Cod Bay that did not pay its duty.

"It is enacted by the Court that if any person or person that shall at any time hereafter ship or load on board any fish, caught at Cape Cod but such as he or they shall give an account of to the water bailiff: All such fish shall be forfeited to the colony's use. The water bailiff is hereby empowered to make seizure of all such fish as shall at any time become forfeit and is to give account thereof to the Treasurer or such as shall be appointed by the magistrates or any four of them to take the said account."

In 1673, a law passed which said that all profits from the Cape Cod fishery would be used to fund a public school. In 1684, the taking of mackerel ashore with seines or nets was prohibited under the forfeiture of the seines nets vessels and boats employed. The forfeitures were to be divided between the informer and the colony. Magistrates were authorized to issue warrants to persons empowering them as water bailiffs to make such seizures. The Massachusetts Bay Colony (situated around present day Boston and Salem) and the Colony of New Plymouth (situated around present day Barnstable County, Plymouth county and Bristol county) unified in 1692 to form the Province of Massachusetts Bay. In 1693, deer hunting was prohibited between January 1 and July 1. The first offense forty shillings, second offense three pounds, third offense five pounds. In 1710, a law was passed that banned the hunting of waterfowl from any boat, canoe, float, raft, or vessel. The penalty for breaking the law was a fine of forty shillings and a three-year prohibition from hunting any waterfowl. In 1727, the law was revised to include the prohibition of hunting waterfowl at night. The penalty from the crime was split between the person reporting the crime and the poor.

In 1717, to increase the deer population, a law was passed which prohibited any killing of bucks, does, and fawns until August 1, 1721.

"Whereas the depth of snow in some late winters hath been so great as hath occasioned the destruction of a great part of the deer in this province; to the intent that the said creature (which is both harmless and profitable) may be preserved and increased".

=== The first game warden ===
Massachusetts was the first in the nation to appoint game wardens in 1739. The first game wardens were first known as "Informers of Deer" and later on as "Deer Reeves". In 1739, the fine for killing a buck, doe, or fawn was increased from forty shillings to ten pounds. Along with the increased fine, every town in the province was now required to appoint two people to enforce the revised law. The two people chosen by the towns were known as "Informers of Deer" and they were sworn town officers "whose care and duty it shall be to inform of all breaches of this act, and to take care that the violators thereof be duly prosecuted and punished". The informers were the first game wardens in the country. The penalty for towns which did not choose Informers was thirty pounds. In 1763, the act to increase the deer population in the colony was revised to include moose. The revised law prohibited any hunting of deer and moose from December 21 to August 11 of each year. The law also required each town in the colony to appoint two deer-reeves. The deer reeves duties, like the "Informer of Deers", was to enforce the deer protection act and prosecute any offenders. An excerpt from court records:

"At a court in Northampton, March, 1763 John Worthington Esq. Attorney for our sovereign lord the king, in this behalf, here instantly complains and gives this court to understand and be informed, that Azariah Selden of Hadley, in the county of Hampshire, yeoman, on the 8th day of March current, did at said Northampton, wittingly and willingly, with force and arms, kill one wild deer, and then and there had in his possession the raw flesh and raw skin of one wild deer, killed since the 21st day of December last, contrary to a law of this province, the peace of said lord the king, his crown and dignity. He was fined 10 pounds and costs 29 shillings, Noah Smith Jr of Hadley the informer, was to have half the fine".

=== Establishment of Fisheries Board of Commissioners ===
In 1865, the Board of Commissioners on Fisheries was created and composed of three members. Deputy commissioners were appointed by the commissioners. The deputy commissioners were given the power to arrest without warrant persons found violating laws. Fishing on Sundays was also banned by an act which said "Whoever attempts to take or catch any fish on the Lord's Day ... shall be punished by a fine not exceeding ten dollars". In 1886, the commission's authority was extended to the protection and preservation of birds and animals and its name was changed to Board of Commissioners on Fisheries and Game. In 1899, any hunting of birds and game on Sundays was banned. In 1901, the Attorney General, Hosea M. Knowlton, rendered a decision that the deputies of the commission are no longer allowed to enforce the Sunday fishing ban. The decision made by the attorney general was made because the Sunday fishing ban was not a law relating to inland fisheries.

"Its authority for the enforcement of law being definitely limited to fish and game laws, and the recent rulings and decisions having been established the fact that the law relating to Sunday fishing is "An act for the better observance of the Lord's day" and not a fish law, it was manifestly our duty to instruct our deputies not to enforce a law which we have no right to enforce".

In 1901, the deputy force consisted of paid deputies, special deputies, and unpaid deputies. The paid deputies were employed by the state and served as deputies all year long. The special deputies worked varying terms of service and were employed by the state, hunting clubs, and towns. In 1902, the Office of Inspector General of Fish was abolished and its power and duties are given to the Board of Commissioners on Fisheries and Game. The deputy force of 1911 consisted of 29 paid deputies, 15 special deputies, and 186 unpaid deputies. In 1912, a new law was passed which authorized that every town and city can appoint a fish and game warden with a salary not exceeding fifty dollars. The town wardens were given the same powers as the commission's deputies and were paid by the town.

In 1919, the Board of Commissioners on Fisheries and Game was abolished and the Department of Conservation (DOC) was first established.

With the creation of the Department of Conservation all of the states fish and game laws were now enforced by the Division of Fisheries and Game. In 1929, the Bureau of Marine Fisheries was established within the Division of Fisheries and Game. The new legislation also required wardens and deputies to wear a metallic badge when on duty and with authorization to carry a weapon.

"The wardens and deputies, when on duty, shall wear and display a metallic badge bearing the seal of the commonwealth and the words "fish and game warden" or "deputy fish and game warden", as the case may be. The director, with the approval of the governor, may in writing authorize any warden to have in his possession and carry a revolver, club, billy, handcuffs and twisters, or such other weapon or article required in the performance of his official duty".

In 1933, the name of the Division of Fisheries and Game was changed to the Division of Game and Inland Fisheries. The Bureau of Marine Fisheries separated from the Division of Game and Inland Fisheries in 1939. The new Division of Marine Fisheries was created to enforce the marine fisheries laws and to appoint coastal wardens. In 1941, a Bureau of Law Enforcement was created within the Division of Game and Inland Fisheries and the Division of Marine Fisheries.

"There shall be in the division a bureau of law enforcement, under the charge of a chief conservation officer. All conservation officers, deputy conservation officers and fish and game wardens of the division shall be assigned to duty in said bureau".

In 1945, the authority of officers to enforce game laws on public land including the Quabbin Reservoir without a permit was questioned. The Attorney General, Clarence A. Barnes, ruled in favor of the Division of Fisheries and Game.

"Accordingly, I advise you that the officers of the Division of Fisheries and Game, referred to in G.L (Ter. Ed.) c. 131 S 18 as amended, have the power and duty of enforcing the game laws on the public lands, including those of the Quabbin Reservoir under the control of the Metropolitan District commission, and have the right to enter upon such lands when necessary for the purpose of such enforcement".

In 1948, the Division of Law Enforcement was established within the Department of Conservation. The new division consisted of a director who was given the authority to appoint a chief coastal warden and chief conservation officer. The conservation officers enforced inland fish and game laws and the coastal wardens enforced marine fisheries laws. In 1953, the Department of Conservation changed its name to the Department of Natural Resources. The Division of Law Enforcement was also given the authority to enforce laws relating to marine fisheries, inland fisheries, game, forests, parks, fire, and dogs. In 1964, the law enforcement responsibilities of the coastal warden service and the conservation officer were combined. The new name of the coastal warden and conservation officer was changed to natural resource officer. In 1975, the Department of Natural Resources was reorganized and became the Executive Office of Environmental Affairs. The Division of Law Enforcement became the only statewide agency with the primary responsibility to prevent violations of the state's environmental laws. In 1978, the Department of Law Enforcement signed a Memorandum of Understanding with the National Marine Fisheries Service to enforce federal laws. In 1981, the Division of Law Enforcement was transferred back to the Department of Fisheries, Wildlife, and Recreation Vehicles.

=== Establishment of the Massachusetts Environmental Police ===
In 1985, the Division of Law Enforcement and the Division of Marine and Recreational Vehicles merged. After the merger, the new agency fell under the Department of Fisheries, Wildlife, and Environmental Law Enforcement. The new department was called the Massachusetts Environmental Police and officers were called Environmental Police Officers.

After the 2001 September 11 attacks, the Environmental Police department's role changed to include homeland security. In 2003, the department was transferred back to the Executive Office of Environmental Affairs. The name of the department was also changed to the Office of Law Enforcement.

Today, the police continue enforcement of fish and game laws including the commercial and recreational harvest of the living marine resources along the Massachusetts coastline. The department's responsibilities include the protection of natural resources, homeland security and law enforcement, safety education, and accident investigation. The department consists of six different bureaus.

=== Criticism of management ===
In 2016, media reports exposed questionable payroll practices at the Environmental Police, including allowing officers to split shifts so they could work overtime details in the middle of the day, allowing officers to use paid time off (sick days and vacation time) to trigger overtime payments for regular work, and not accounting for the time it takes employees to travel between work locations. The agency was also criticized for patronage hires and for removing GPS tracking devices from vehicles at the request of the officers' union.

== Bureaus ==
The Massachusetts Environmental Police has 100 officers and is divided into six Bureaus.

=== Coastal Bureau ===
Massachusetts coastal communities are divided into six enforcement regions encompassing approximately 1,500 square miles. Offshore enforcement adds an additional 2,500 square miles of territorial waters to the Environmental Police's jurisdiction. Coastal officers monitor fishing and other activities both on land and at sea.

Officers patrol coastal waters conducting investigations of illegal fishing practices, marine theft cases, and enforcement of boat registration and titling requirements.

The coastal force mediates disputes between competing fishing interests such as draggers, gill-netters, lobster men, and recreational anglers. In addition, coastal officers closely monitor fish markets, processing facilities, shellfish digging, and Off-Highway Vehicle use on beaches.

=== Inland Bureau ===
Environmental Police Officers serving in the inland regions are responsible for enforcing a wide variety of laws and regulations including the statutes regarding hunting, fishing, trapping, boating, and off-highway vehicles. Inland officers also investigate cases of illegal waste disposal, wetlands violations, and assist in search and rescue efforts. Officers patrol in cruisers, four-wheel-drive vehicles, boats, off-road vehicles, on foot, and in aircraft when necessary. Inland officers pay particular attention to state forests, parks, wildlife management areas, boat access sites and heavily used public waterways such as major rivers and great ponds.

=== Boat and Off-Highway Vehicle Safety Bureau ===
The Boat and Recreation Safety Bureau coordinates boating and recreation vehicle safety programs throughout the Commonwealth. Our boating safety training course, called "Boat Massachusetts", addresses fundamental safety concepts and emphasizes the operator's legal and ethical responsibilities. It targets the boating novice, especially young boaters (12 through 15 years of age), who are required by state law to complete such a course in order to operate a motorboat without adult supervision. Additionally, safety and legal demonstrations are offered to groups of boaters, snowmobile riders, and off-highway vehicle users, with programs tailored to a group's particular needs. The Bureau is also responsible for the investigation of all motorboat and recreational vehicle accidents that cause substantial property damage, serious injuries, or fatalities.

=== Environmental Crimes Bureau ===
The Environmental Crimes Bureau is part of a unique interagency investigative organization called the "Environmental Crimes Strike Force". Under the direction of the Attorney General and the Secretary of Energy and Environmental Affairs, the Strike Force combines the prosecutory expertise of the Attorney General's Office with the scientific and investigatory skills of the Department of Environmental Protection, the Environmental Police, and the State Police. The Strike Force investigates and prosecutes environmental crimes that have serious public health consequences—cases involving illegal hazardous and solid waste disposal, water pollution, air quality violations, illegal pesticide application, and violations of wetland protection statutes.

=== Marine Theft Bureau ===
The Marine Theft Bureau was established to combat intensifying theft problems involving vessels, motors, electronic devices, and other marine accessories.

Marine Theft Bureau personnel work closely with the U.S. Coast Guard, federal enforcement agencies, state and local police, harbormasters and insurance agencies to prosecute criminals and recover stolen marine equipment.

In addition, the Bureau's Questioned Documents Section cooperates with the Division's Registration and Titling Bureau on investigations involving disputed motorboat titles and registrations. Through cooperation with the Massachusetts Department of Revenue, the Marine Theft Bureau recovers substantial sales and excise tax revenue to the Commonwealth each year.

=== Registration Bureau ===
The Boat, Off-Highway Vehicle, and Snowmobile Registration Bureau is responsible for registering motorboats, snowmobiles, and recreation vehicles in the Commonwealth of Massachusetts.

== See also ==
- List of law enforcement agencies in Massachusetts
