= Massachusetts Probate and Family Court =

State court in Massachusetts

The Probate and Family Court of Massachusetts has jurisdiction over family matters such as divorce, paternity, child support, custody, visitation, adoption, termination of parental rights, and abuse prevention. Probate matters include jurisdiction over wills, administrations, guardianships, conservatorships and change of name. The Court also has general equity jurisdiction.

The Probate and Family Courts of Massachusetts serve 14 counties: Barnstable, Berkshire, Bristol, Dukes, Essex, Franklin, Hampden, Hampshire, Middlesex, Nantucket, Norfolk, Plymouth, Suffolk, and Worcester. In addition to probate matters, the courts archive divorce and estate records, wills, adoption cases, and legal change of name. These probate records can be obtained with a docket number and fee.
