= Massachusetts Juvenile Court =

The Juvenile Court Department of Massachusetts has general jurisdiction over delinquency, children in need of services (CHINS), care and protection petitions, adult contributing to a delinquency of a minor cases, adoption, guardianship, termination of parental rights proceedings, and youthful offender cases.
