= List of courthouses in Boston =

This list includes courthouse buildings in Boston, Massachusetts, used by municipal, county, state and federal courts, from the 17th century through the present.

== Built in the 17th and 18th centuries ==
- First Town-House, Boston, built 1658. "The first Boston town house, constructed of wood on the site of the market-place, defined the town's political, social, and economic center by housing the colonial government, law courts, markets, and militia musters."
- State House, built 1713, on the site of the former Town-House This building still exists as the "Old State House," State Street.
- Court house, built 1768-69, Queen Street. "... the Justices of the Court of Sessions for the County of Suffolk, have voted to build an elegant new Court House in Queen Street ..." "The elegant new Court-House in Queen-Street, Boston, being now finish'd ..." "Municipal Court continued to be held ... until June 20, 1822." By 1807 some disliked its features: "The County Court-House in Court street is by no means an ornament to the town; it is small, inconvenient, and exposed to the noise of a very busy street. ... In the court-house are kept the probate-office and registry of deeds for the county." Alternately, historian Caleb Snow describes it in 1828 more favorably: "The Old Court House on the south side of Court-street, is a handsome building of brick, three stories high, and has on the roof an octagon cupola. On the lower floor are the offices of the United States District Marshall, and several private offices. In the second story, the floor of which is supported by pillars of the Tuscan order, are held the Circuit and District Courts of the U.S. for the Massachusetts District, and the office of the District Clerk. In the third story are convenient rooms for jurors, etc. This building, before the erection of the New Court House [in 1810] ... was used by all the courts of law held in the county."
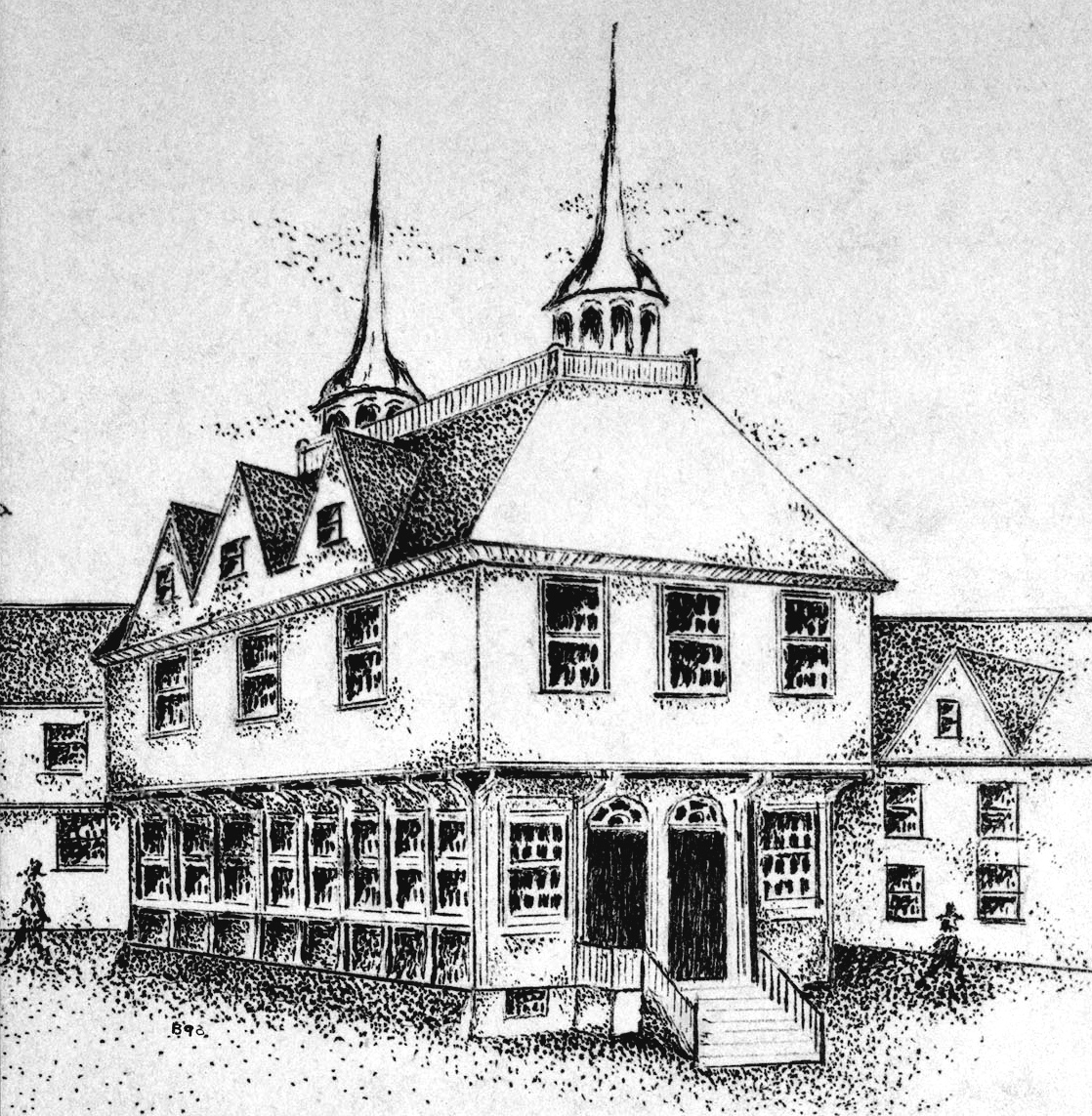
Conjectural drawing of First Town-House, King St., 17th century

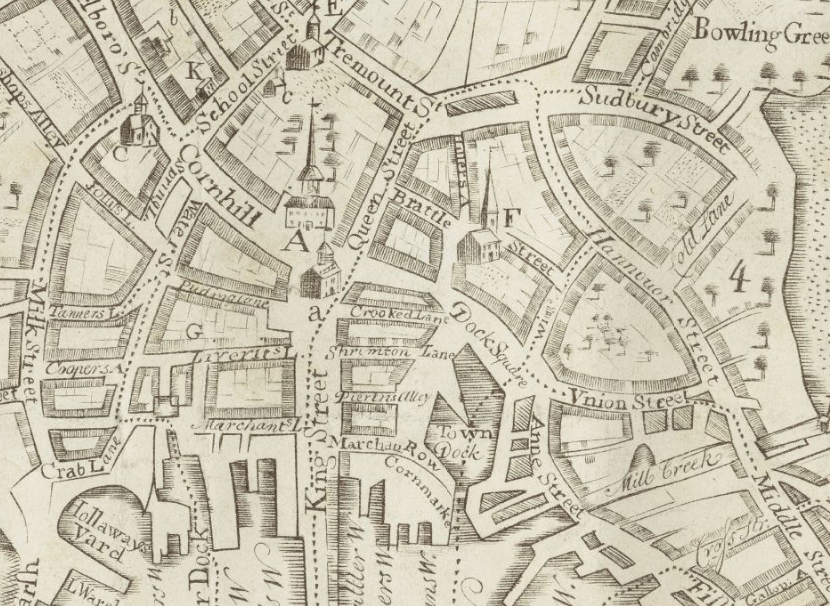
Detail of 1728 map of Boston, showing location of State House (letter "a" on map)

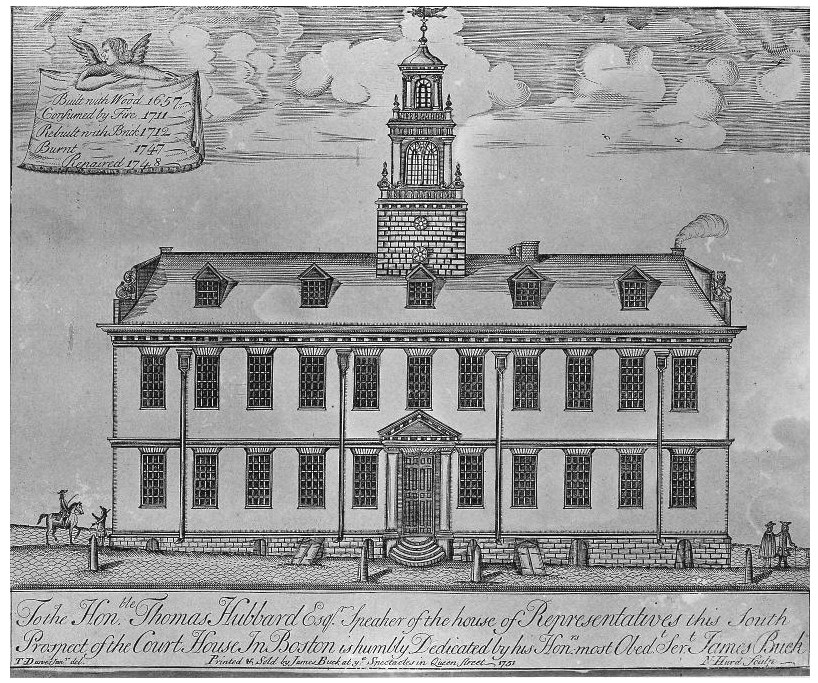
Court House, Boston, built 1713 (engraving 1751 by Nathaniel Hurd; courtesy Museum of Fine Arts, Boston)

== Built in the 19th century ==
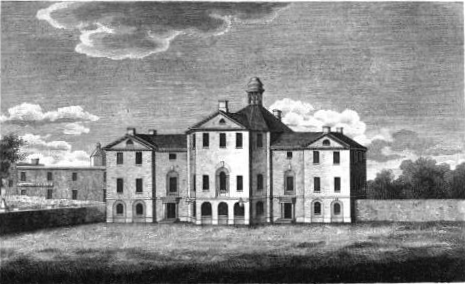
Stone Court House, between Court Square and School Street; built 1810

- Suffolk County Courthouse, also called Johnson Hall; built 1810 by Charles Bulfinch, School Street, Boston. Functioned as county court (1810-1841) and U.S. court (1810-1836). "Remodeled for use as a city hall by [Gridley J.F.] Bryant, 1840-1841. Demolished 1863."

The Stone Court-House in Court-Square, to which for distinction's sake we have given the name of Johnson Hall ... (with reference to the memory of lsaac Johnson esq. ... a chief patron of the first settlers of Boston ...) was built in 1810. It is described as consisting of an octagon centre, 55 ft. wide, with two wings, 26 by 40 feet, connected by the entrance and passages to the centre. The length of the whole building is 140 ft. The lower story of the centre is improved by the Register of Deeds, and Clerk of the C.C.P. -— the second story by the County Courts, and the upper by the Common Council of the city. The Mayor and Aldermen's room is in the upper story of the western wing; under that are the offices of the Auditor and City Marshal, and on the lower floor the Probate Office. In the eastern wing are the offices of the Clerk of the S.J. Court, rooms for the judges and for the juries, and one occupied by the Law Library.

- Municipal Court House, built 1822, Leverett Street.
- Court house, built 1836, Court Square. Housed municipal court beginning in 1837.

The first floor contains rooms for the Police Court and Justices Court, the United States Marshal's room, and the offices of the clerks of the Supreme Court, Court of Common Pleas, and Police Court. The second story contains the rooms of the United States and the Supreme Judicial Courts, as also the Law Library, the rooms for the judges of the United States and Supreme Courts, and the clerk's office of the United States Court. The upper or third story includes the Common Pleas and Municipal Court rooms and the rooms of the judges of those courts, the jury rooms of the several courts, the clerk's office and the witness rooms of the municipal court, and the grand jury room.

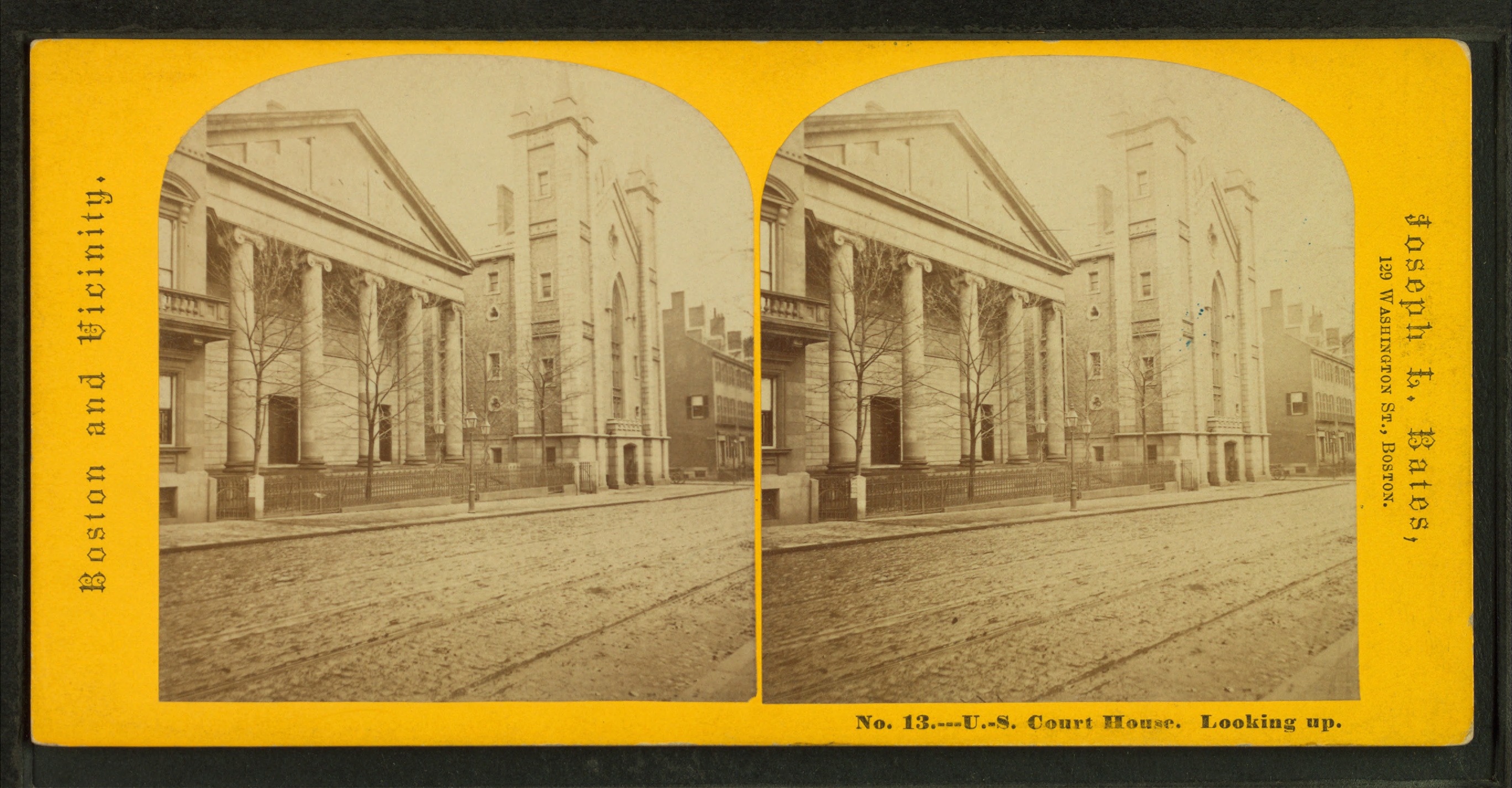
U.S. Courthouse (at right), in former Masonic Temple, Tremont St., 1858-1885. Built 1832, demolished 1908

- U.S. Court House, Bowdoin Square; used c. 1858.
- Masonic Temple, corner Tremont Street and Temple Place; used as U.S. federal court, 1858-1885. Built 1832. "The building was sold to the U.S. government for $105,000 for use as a federal courthouse in 1858." "The federal government in 1885 sold the building at acution." In 1886 R.H. Stearns & Co. moved into the "remodeled building. ... [It] continued as their place of business until 1908, when it was completely torn down."
- U.S. Post Office and Subtreasury, built 1885. Alfred B. Mullett, supervising architect. "The U.S. District Court for the District of Massachusetts met here ... [1883- 1929]; the U.S. Circuit Court for the District of Massachusetts met here from 1883, prior to completion, until that court was abolished in 1912. Razed in 1929."
- John Adams Courthouse, built 1893, Pemberton Square. Designed by George Albert Clough. Functioned as Suffolk County Courthouse c. 1893. Currently houses the Massachusetts Supreme Judicial Court and the Massachusetts Appeals Court
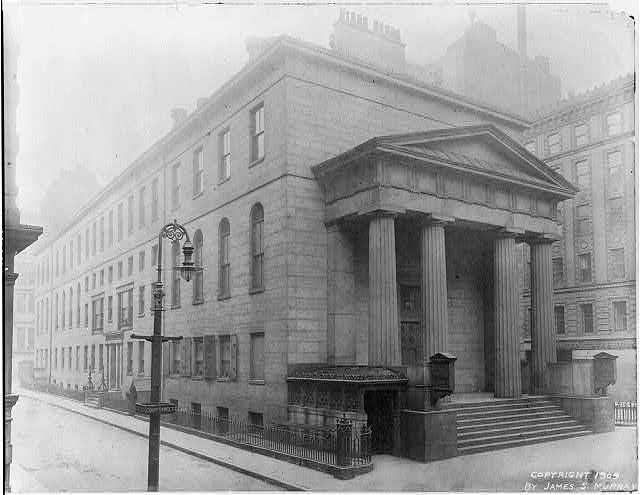
Court House, Court Square; built 1836 (photo 1909)

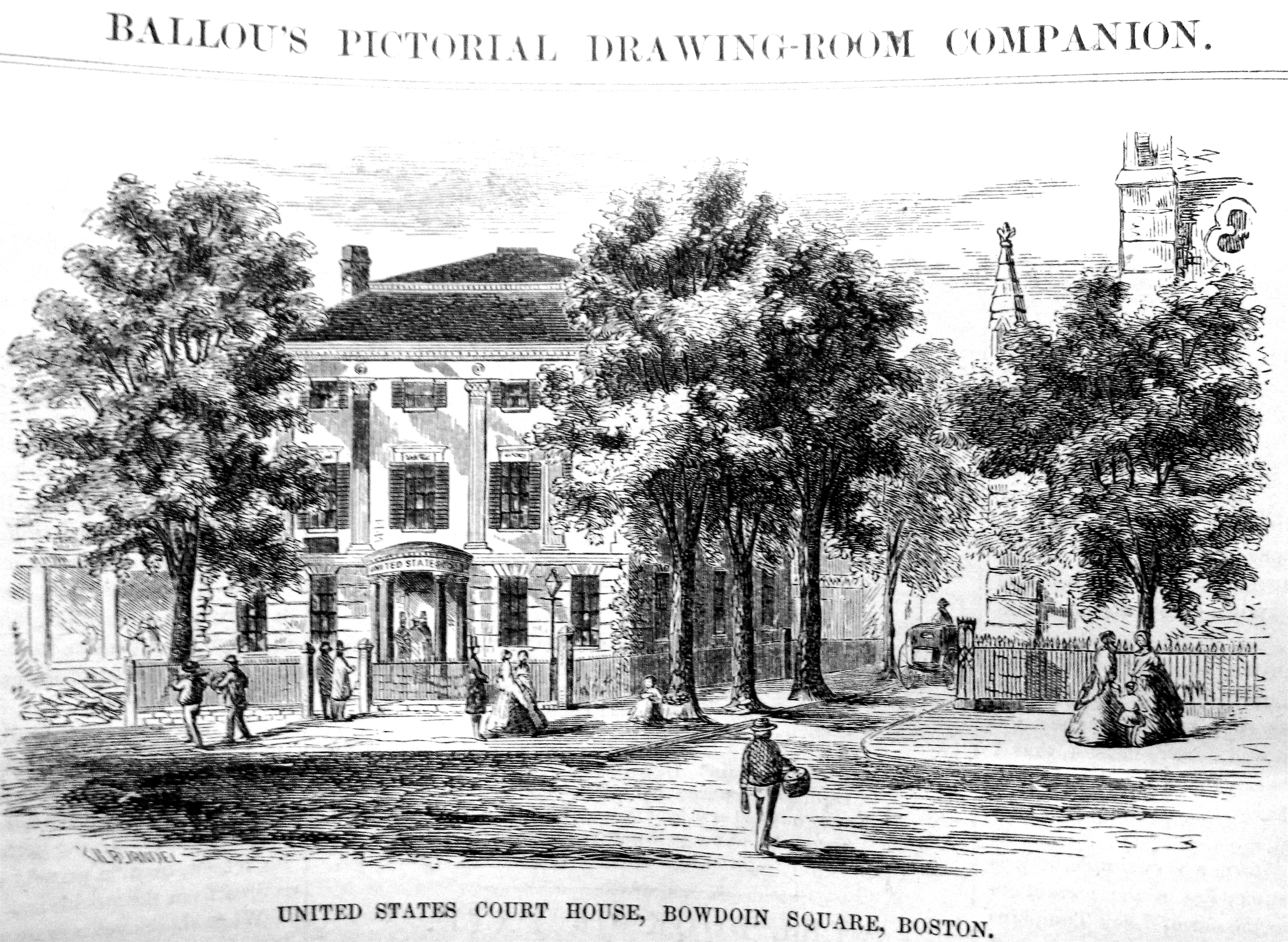
U.S. Courthouse, Bowdoin Square, c. 1850s

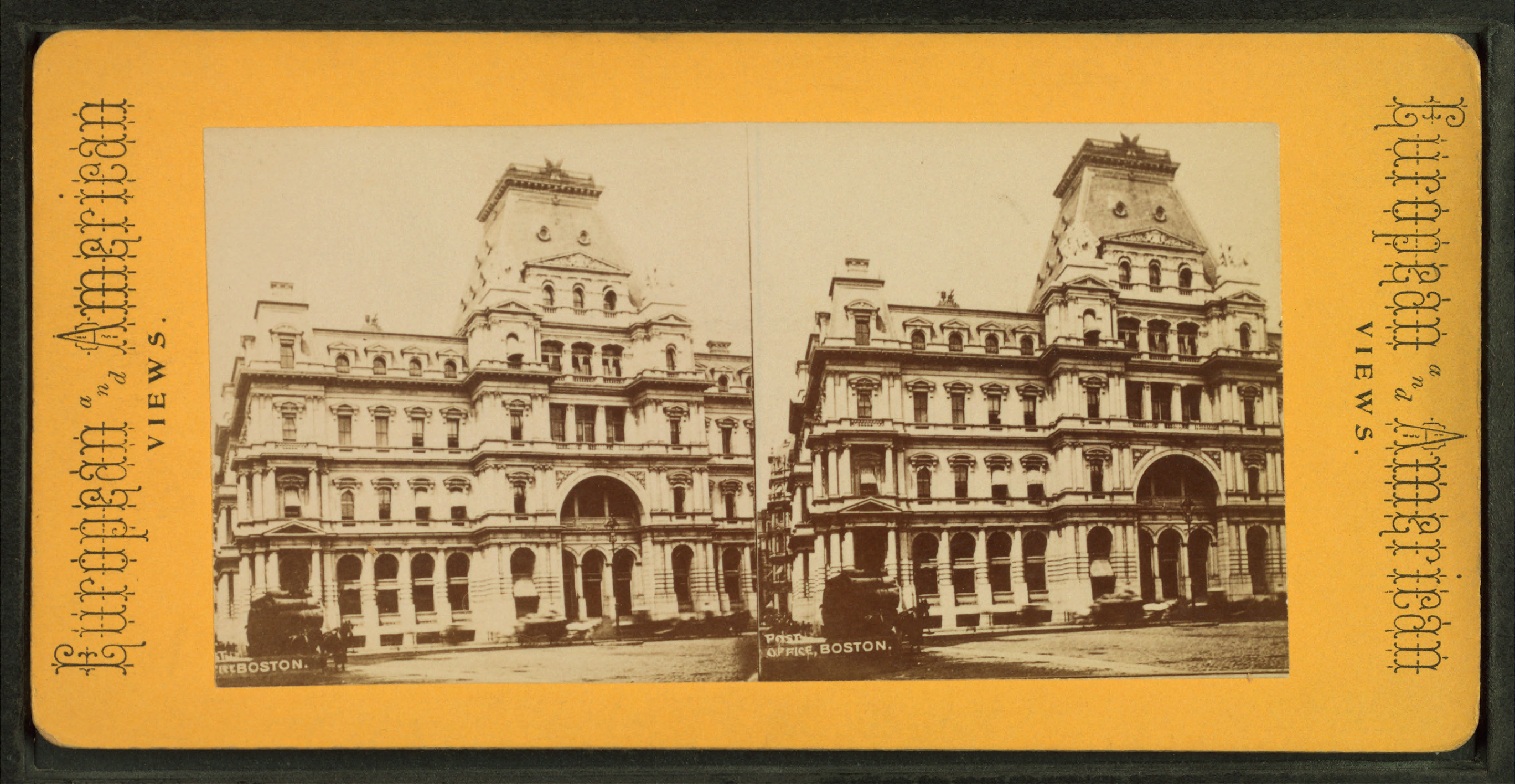
Post Office; built 1885, demolished 1929

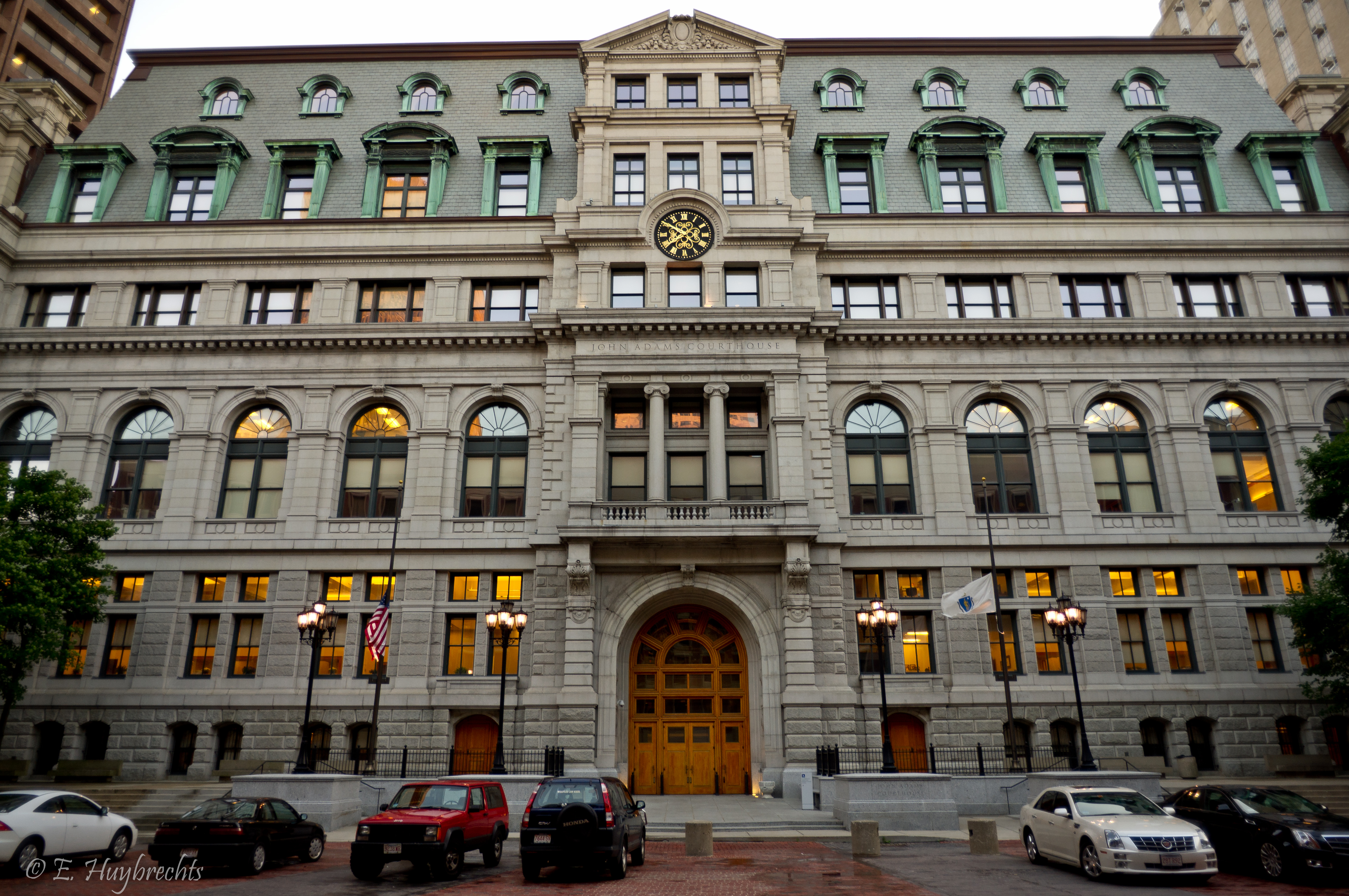
Adams Courthouse; built 1893, Pemberton Square (photo 2010)

== Built in the 20th century ==
- John W. McCormack Post Office and Courthouse, built 1933, also known as the John W. McCormack Federal Building, 5 Post Office Square, Boston. Designed by Cram & Ferguson. Currently houses the U.S. Bankruptcy Court.
- Suffolk County Courthouse (1937), built 1937, Pemberton Square, Boston. Currently houses the Suffolk County Superior Court for Criminal Business.
- John F. Kennedy Federal Building, built 1966. Currently houses the U.S. Immigration Court.
- Moakley courthouse, built 1999; also called the John Joseph Moakley United States Courthouse, One Courthouse Way, Boston. Designed by TRO Jung Brannen. Houses the United States District Court for the District of Massachusetts and the United States Court of Appeals for the First Circuit.
- Edward W. Brooke Courthouse, built 1999; 24 New Chardon Street, Boston. Designed by Kallmann McKinnell & Wood Architects, Inc. Houses the "Boston Juvenile Court, Boston Housing Court, Land Court, Suffolk Probate and Family Court, and the Suffolk County Registry of Deeds."
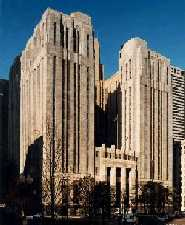
McCormack Post Office & Courthouse, built 1933, Post Office Square

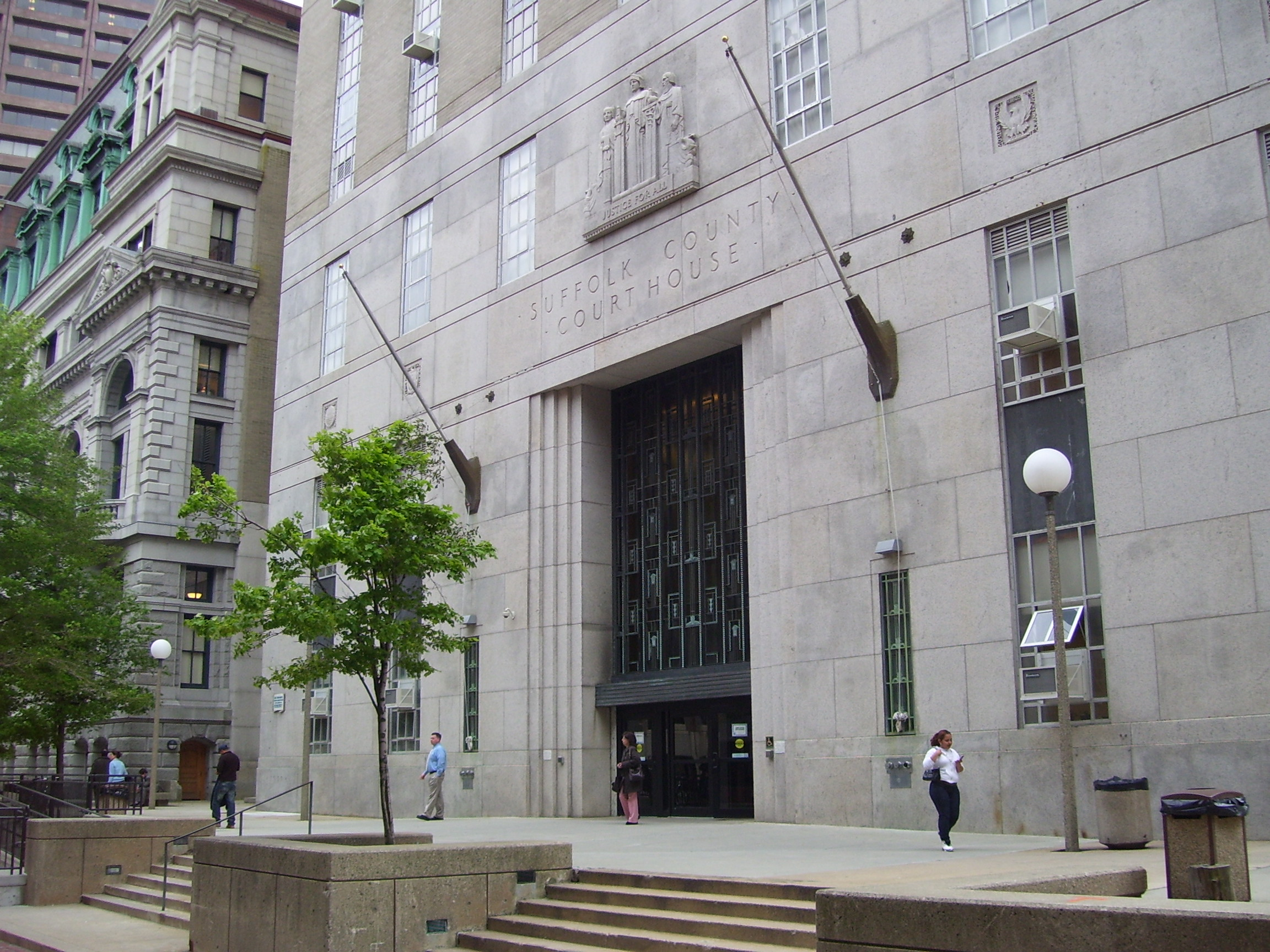
Suffolk County Courthouse, built 1937, Pemberton Square

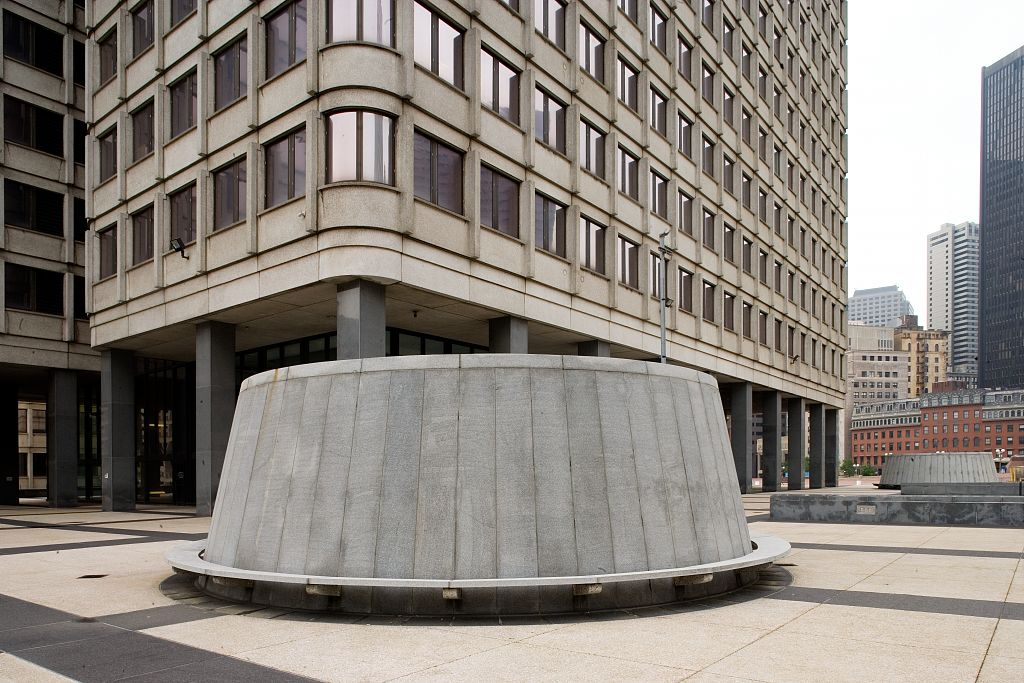
Kennedy building, Government Center; built 1966

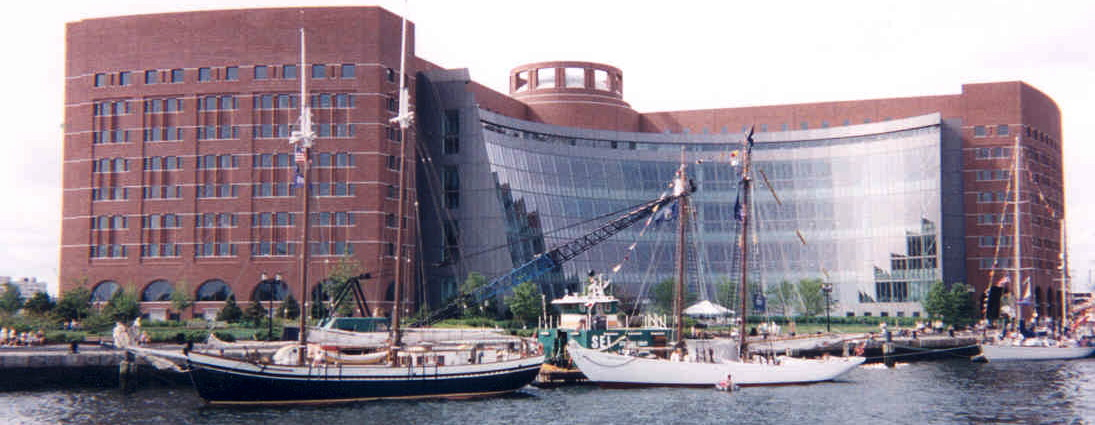
Moakley Courthouse, built 1999, on Boston Harbor

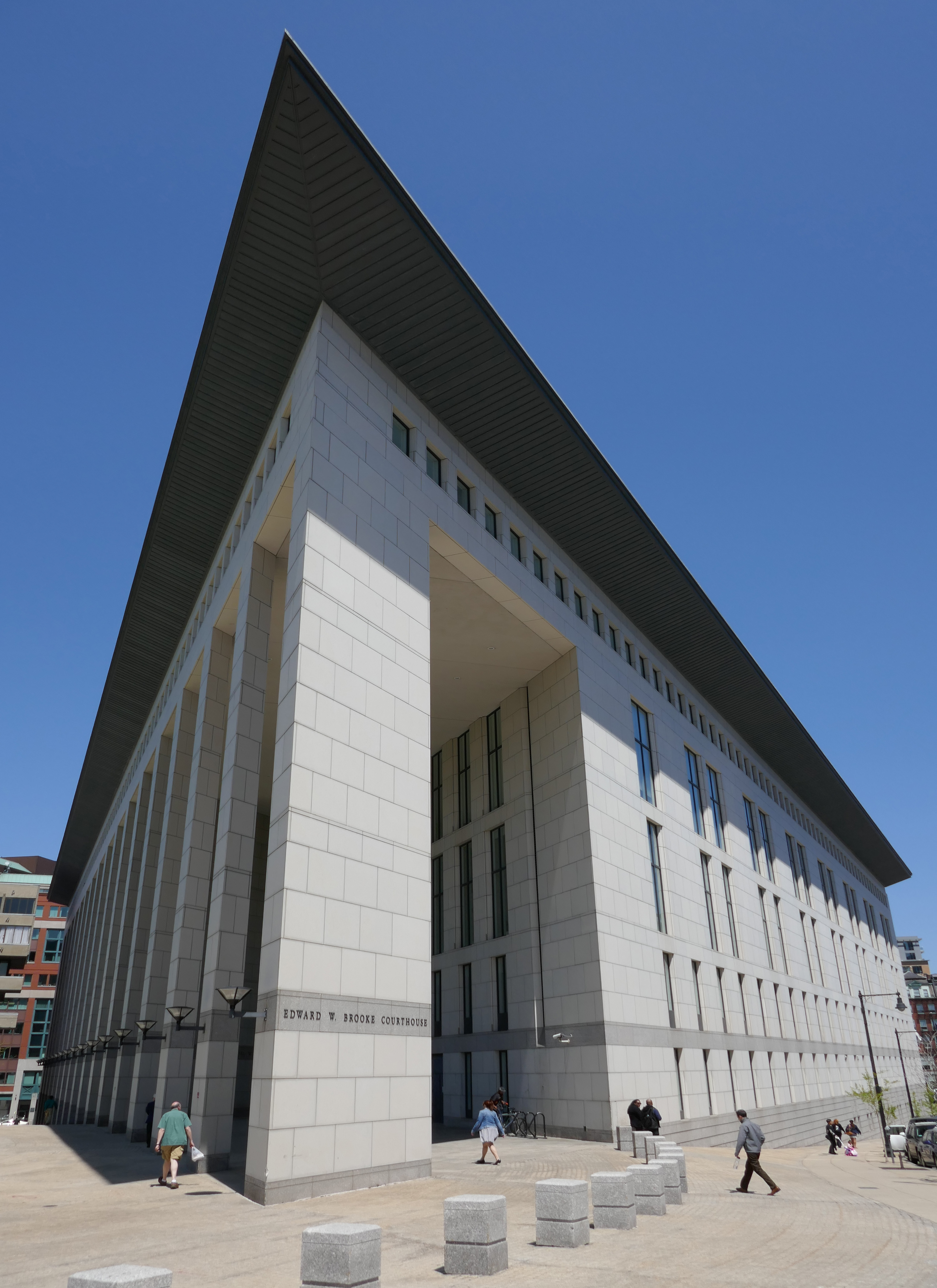
Brooke courthouse, New Chardon St.; built 1999
