= Hubbard Winslow =

American minister and author (1799–1864)

Hubbard Winslow (October 30, 1799 – August 13, 1864) was an American minister and author.

He was born on October 30, 1799, son of Nathaniel and Anna (Kellogg) Winslow, and brother of Rev. Miron and Rev. Gordon Winslow. He graduated from Yale College in 1825. He began his theological studies in Andover Theological Seminary, and completed them at the Yale Divinity School. In December 1828, he was ordained Pastor of the First Congregational Church in Dover, New Hampshire from which place he retired three years afterward. In Sept. 1832, he was installed Pastor of the Bowdoin Street Church, Boston, succeeding there Rev. Lyman Beecher. In 1844, he became principal of the Mount Vernon School for Young Ladies, which position he held nine years, often preaching on the Sabbath in Boston and its vicinity.

He afterward made a visit to Europe, and then devoted himself to the preparation of several books. In June 1857, he was installed as pastor of the First Presbyterian Church in Geneva, New York. He remained there two years and then went to New York, where he opened a boarding-school for young ladies. In 1861 he was installed pastor of the 50th St. Presbyterian Church in New York, but he did not continue there many months. He devoted the closing part of his life to teaching and writing for the press.

Among the most important of his numerous publications is Discourses on the Trinity, The Young Man's Aid, Self Examination, Intellectual Philosophy, and Moral Philosophy. He is also the author of various printed discourses, including a history of the Presbyterian Church in Geneva. He received the degree of D. D. from Hamilton College in 1858.

He died at Williston, Vermont, his native place, on August 13, 1864.
