= Registry of Deeds (Massachusetts) =

The Commonwealth of Massachusetts has 21 separate Registries of Deeds, each functioning in districts dealing with real estate registration and land records. The registries are divided by county or subdivided within official state counties. These divisions are headed by elected officials known as a Register, and fall under the purview of the Secretary of the Commonwealth of Massachusetts and local county governments.

== By county ==
=== Barnstable ===
County	Registry (area)	Address	Municipality location	Notes
Barnstable County	Registry of Deeds (all)	3195 Main Street	Barnstable	Established: 2 June 1685 from Plymouth County

=== Berkshire ===
County	Registry (area)	Address	Municipality location	Notes
Berkshire County	(Northern District)	65 Park Street	Adams	Established: 21 April 1761 from Hampshire County
Berkshire County	(Middle District)	44 Bank Row	Pittsfield	Established: 21 April 1761 from Hampshire County
Berkshire County	(Southern District)	334 Main Street	Great Barrington	Established: 21 April 1761 from Hampshire County

=== Bristol ===
County	Registry (area)	Address	Municipality location	Notes
Bristol County	(Northern District)	11 Court Street	Taunton	Established: 2 June 1685 from Plymouth County
Bristol County	(Southern District)	#25 North Sixth Street	New Bedford	Established: 2 June 1685 from Plymouth County
Bristol County	(Fall River District)	441 North Main Street	Fall River	Established: 2 June 1685 from Plymouth County

=== Dukes ===
County	Registry (area)	Address	Municipality location	Notes
Dukes County	Registry of Deeds (all)	81 Main Street	Edgartown	Established: 1 November 1683 by New York, and 22 June 1695 by Massachusetts.

=== Essex ===
County	Registry (area)	Address	Municipality location	Notes
Essex County	(Southern District)	100 Cummings Center, Ste. 206-C	Beverly	Established: 10 May 1643. Satellite office for Southern District located at 35 Congress Street, Ste. 2100a in Salem.
Essex County	(Northern District)	1 Union St. Lawrence, MA 01840 Ste. 402	Lawrence	Established: 10 May 1643. Satellite office for Southern District located at 35 Congress Street, Ste. 2100a in Salem.

=== Franklin ===
County	Registry (area)	Address	Municipality location	Notes
Franklin County	Registry of Deeds (all)	Franklin Regional Council of Governments; 425 Main Street	Greenfield	Established: 24 June 1811 from Hampshire County.

=== Hampden ===
County	Registry (area)	Address	Municipality location	Notes
Hampden County	Registry of Deeds (all)	436 Dwight Street, Room B042	Springfield	Established: 25 February 1812 from Hampshire County

=== Hampshire ===
County	Registry (area)	Address	Municipality location	Notes
Hampshire County	Registry of Deeds (all)	60 Railroad Ave	Northampton	Established: 1 May 1662 from Middlesex County

=== Middlesex ===
County	Registry (area)	Address	Municipality location	Notes
Middlesex County	(Southern District)	208 Cambridge Street	East Cambridge	Established: 10 May 1643
Middlesex County	(Northern District)	370 Jackson Street	Lowell	Established: 10 May 1643

=== Nantucket ===
County	Registry (area)	Address	Municipality location	Notes
Nantucket County	Registry of Deeds (all)	Town and County Building; 16 Broad Street	Nantucket	Established: 22 June 1695 from Dukes County

=== Norfolk ===
County	Registry (area)	Address	Municipality location	Notes
Norfolk County	Registry of Deeds (all)	649 High Street	Dedham	A Norfolk County was established 10 May 1643 by the Massachusetts Bay Colony with significantly different bounds than the present county (covering an area north of the Merrimack River); it was disbanded 4 February 1680. The current county was established by the state on 26 March 1793 from Suffolk County.

=== Plymouth ===
County	Registry (area)	Address	Municipality location	Notes
Plymouth County	Registry of Deeds (all)	50 Obery Street	Plymouth	Established: 2 June 1685 from Plymouth Colony.

=== Suffolk ===
County	Registry (area)	Address	Municipality location	Notes
Suffolk County	Registry of Deeds (all)	24 New Chardon Street	Boston	Established: 10 May 1643

=== Worcester ===
County	Registry (area)	Address	Municipality location	Notes
Worcester County	(Southern District)	90 Front Street	Worcester	Established: 2 April 1731 from Middlesex, Suffolk and Hampshire counties.
Worcester County	(Northern District)	166 Boulder Drive, Ste. 202	Fitchburg	Established: 2 April 1731 from Middlesex, Suffolk and Hampshire counties.
