= Massachusetts Housing Court =

Massachusetts trial court

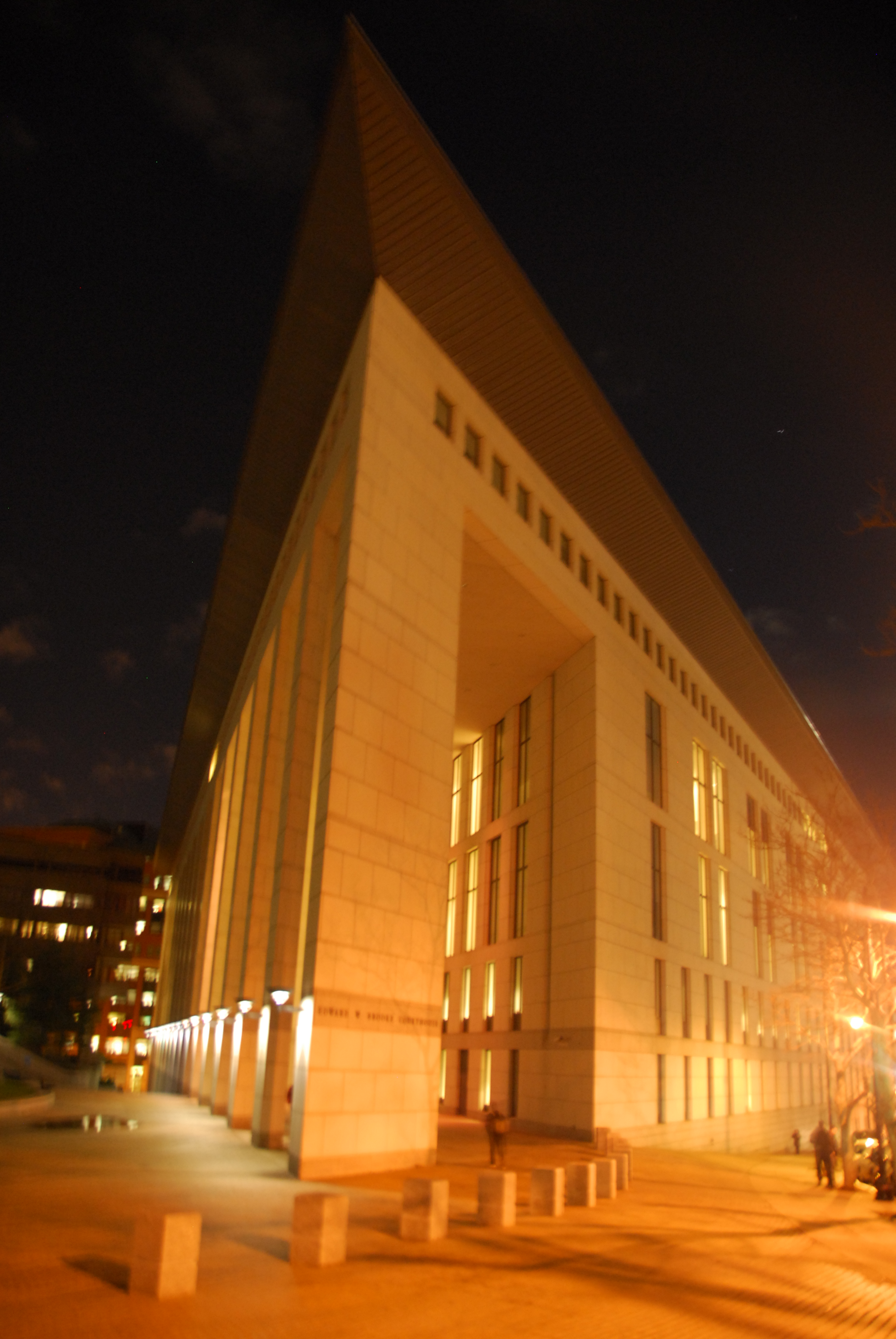
Brooke Courthouse in Boston houses the Administrative Office of the Housing Court Department and is home to the Boston Housing Court

The Massachusetts Housing Court (also known as the Housing Court Department of the Trial Court) is a trial court in Massachusetts that hears eviction cases, small claims cases, and civil actions involving personal injury, property damage, breach of contract, discrimination, and other claims. The Housing Court also hears code enforcement actions and appeals of local zoning board decisions that affect residential housing. The Housing court is led by Chief Justice Diana H. Horan. The Housing Court has 15 judges and covers all fourteen counties of the Commonwealth. The Housing Court has 6 divisions: Central, Eastern, Metro South, Northeast, Southeast, and Western.

In civil matters, Housing Court judges conduct both jury and jury-waived trials, and determine with finality any matter within the court's subject matter jurisdiction. Cases from the housing court may be appealed to the Massachusetts Appeals Court.

== Housing Court Divisions ==
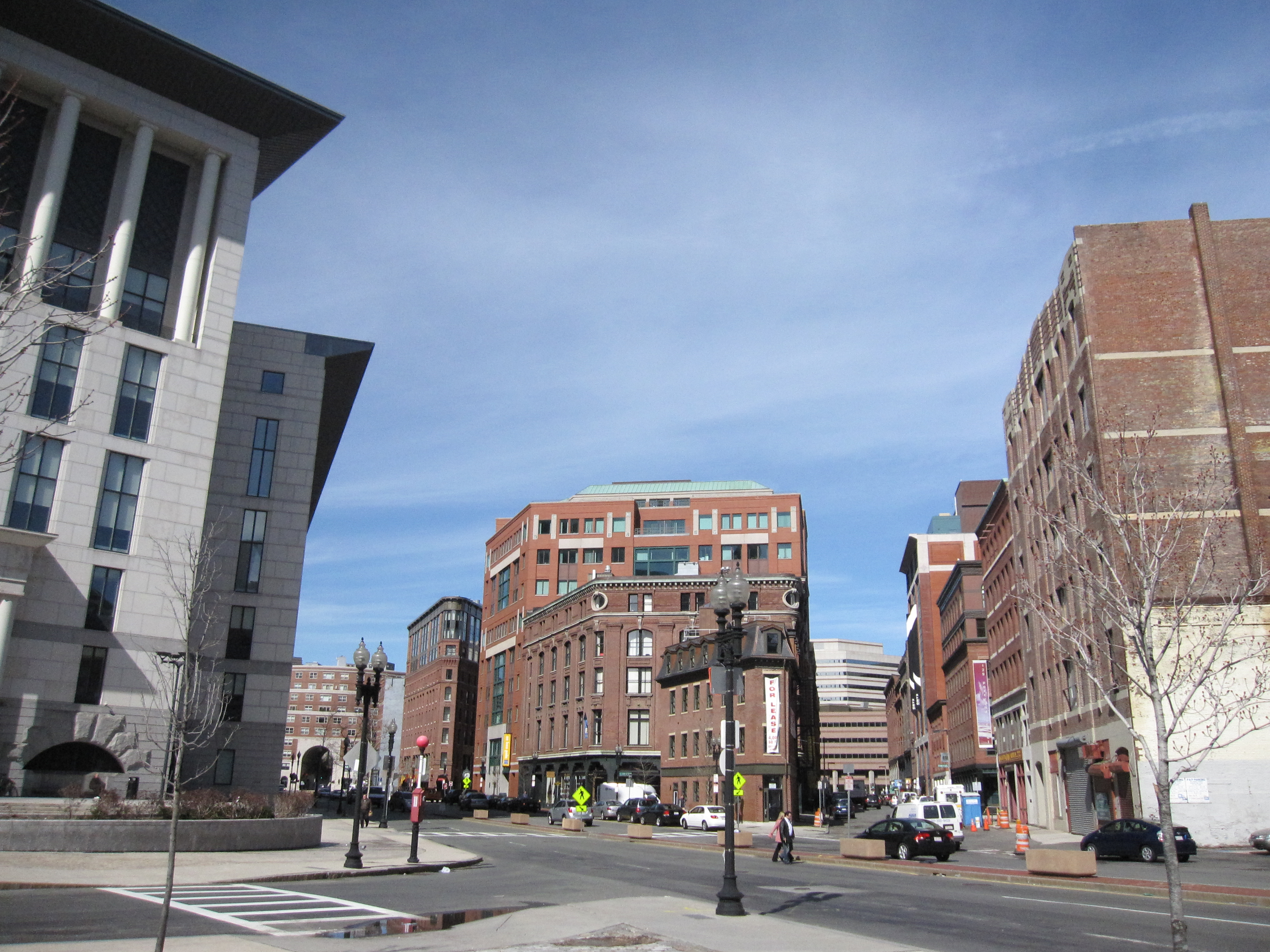
Intersection of New Chardon and Merrimac Streets, Boston, with view of courthouse (at left), 2010

The Eastern Housing Court is located in the Edward W. Brooke Courthouse, 24 New Chardon Street, Boston, Massachusetts. The court was established by the state legislature in 1971 as the Boston Housing Court and started its operation in August 1972. It handles summary proceedings for possession of land, also known as summary process. The court is one division of the Massachusetts Housing Court. The Eastern Division has sessions in Boston, Chelsea, and Somerville.

The Central Housing Court is located at 225 Main Street, Worcester, MA. It has sessions in Worcester, Dudley, Leominster and Marlborough.

The Western Housing Court is located at 37 Elm Street, Springfield, MA. It has sessions in Springfield, Pittsfield, Greenfield and Hadley.

The Northeast Housing Court is located at 2 Appleton Street, 2d Floor, Lawrence, MA. It has sessions in Lawrence, Lowell, Lynn, Salem and Woburn.

The Southeast Housing Court is located at 289 Rock St, Fall River, MA. It has sessions in Fall River, New Bedford, Plymouth and Taunton.

The Metro South Housing Court is located at 215 Main Street, Suite 160, Brockton, MA. It has sessions in Brockton and Canton.

== Judges ==
As of 2023, the Housing Court judges are:

- Hon. Diana H. Horan, Chief Justice
- Hon. Benjamin Adeyinka (Associate Justice, Eastern)
- Hon. Irene Bagdoian (Associate Justice, Eastern)
- Hon. Sergio Carvajal (First Justice, Central)
- Hon. Gustavo del Puerto (First Justice, Northeast)
- Hon. Robert G. Fields (Associate Justice, Western)
- Hon. Eduardo Gonzalez (Associate Justice, Eastern)
- Hon. Diana H. Horan (Associate Justice, Central)
- Hon. Jonathan Kane (First Justice, Western)
- Hon. Joseph Kelleher (First Justice, Eastern)
- Hon. Michael Malamut (Associate Justice, Northeast)
- Hon. Joseph Michaud (Associate Justice, Southeast)
- Hon. Alexander Mitchell-Munevar (Associate Justice, Northeast)
- Hon. Donna Salvidio (First Justice, Southeast)
- Hon. Neil Sherring (First Justice, Metro South)
- Hon. Maria Theophilis (Associate Justice, Metro South)
- Hon. Fairlie A. Dalton (Recall Justice)
- Hon. Anne Kenney Chaplin (Recall Justice)
- Hon. Jeffrey M. Winik (Recall Justice)
