= Bowdoin Square (Boston) =

Coordinates: 42.3615°N 71.0624°W

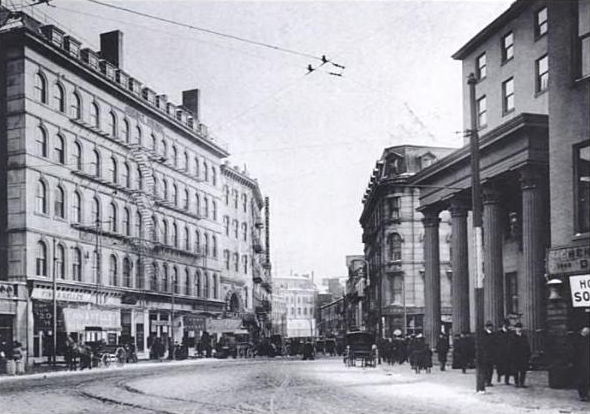
Bowdoin Square, Boston, c. 1880

Bowdoin Square (established 1788) in Boston, Massachusetts, United States, was located in the West End. In the 18th and 19th centuries it featured residential houses, leafy trees, a church, hotel, theatre and other buildings. Among the notables who have lived in the square: physician Thomas Bulfinch; merchant Kirk Boott; and mayor Theodore Lyman. The urban renewal project in the West End in the 1950s removed Green Street and Chardon Street, which formerly ran into the square, and renamed some existing streets; it is now a traffic intersection at Cambridge Street, Bowdoin Street, and New Chardon Street.

Bowdoin Square is served by the MBTA Blue Line station Bowdoin.

== Brief history ==
Some of the features of Bowdoin Square in its heyday included:

- Kirk Boott house (built 1804). "The half-acre lot on which Boott build his brick house was then a pasture in Boston's West End, an area that was just beginning to be developed. Boott's three-story Federal mansion, with its tall Palladian windows lighting the staircase overlooking the garden, was very likely designed by Charles Bulfinch."
- Samuel Parkman house (built c. 1816). "The large granite double house which stood for years at the western end of Bowdoin Square was built about 1816 by Hon. Samuel Parkman, a rich merchant. He was father of Dr.George Parkman who was murdered in 1849 by John White Webster ... [and] grandfather of Francis Parkman, the historian."
- Baptist Tabernacle (built 1840); also known as the Bowdoin-Square Church or the Bowdoin Square Baptist Church
- Revere House hotel (1847–1912)
- United States Court House (19th century)
- Bowdoin Square Hotel
- Bowdoin Square Theatre

== Images ==
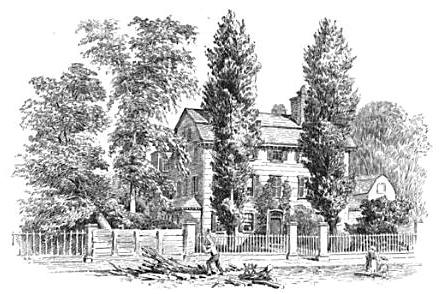
House built by Thomas Bulfinch II, after 1722. His grandson Charles Bulfinch was born here

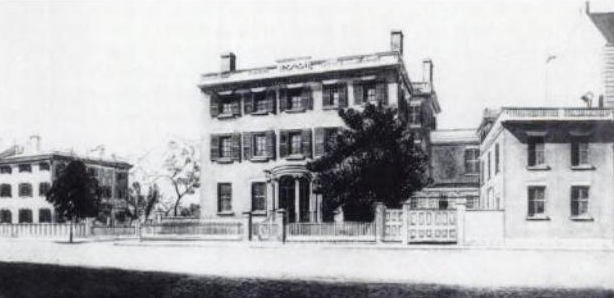
Kirk Boott house, built 1804

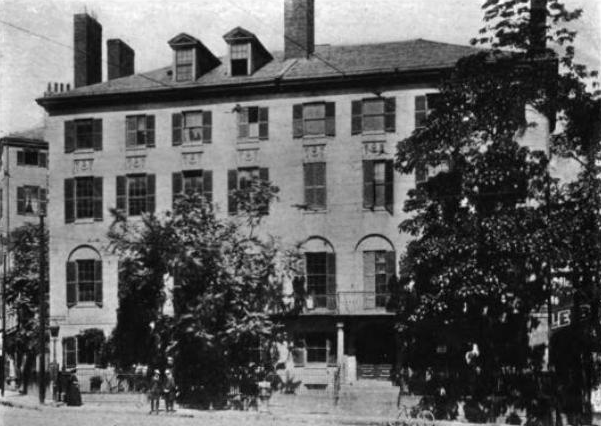
Samuel Parkman house, built c. 1816

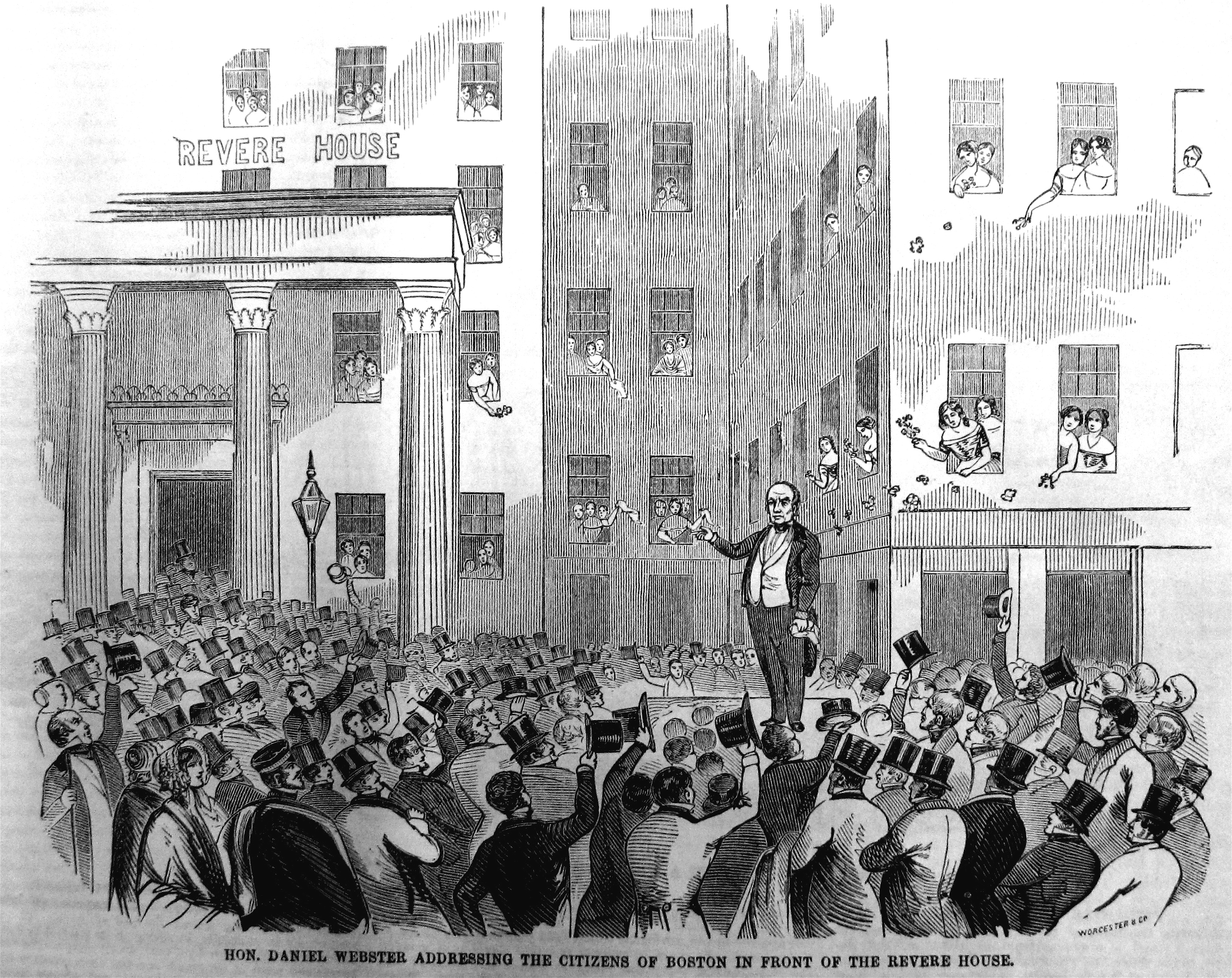
Daniel Webster, 1850 ("A great crowd had collected ... and on his appearance in a barouche, he was enthusiastically cheered."

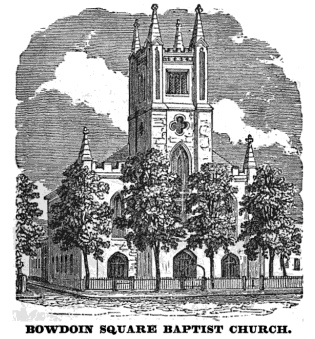
Bowdoin Square Baptist Church, built 1840

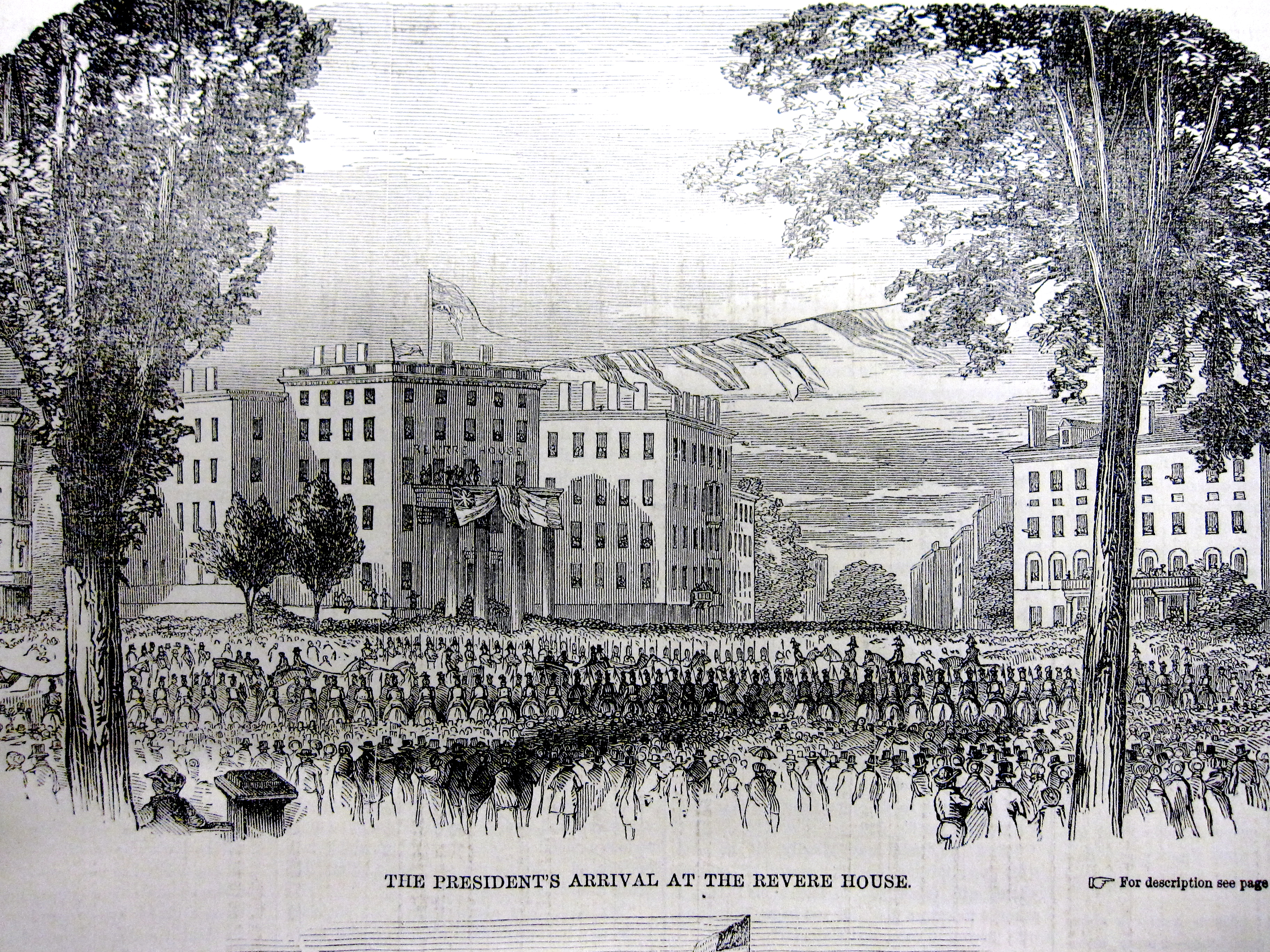
Railroad Jubilee, 1854

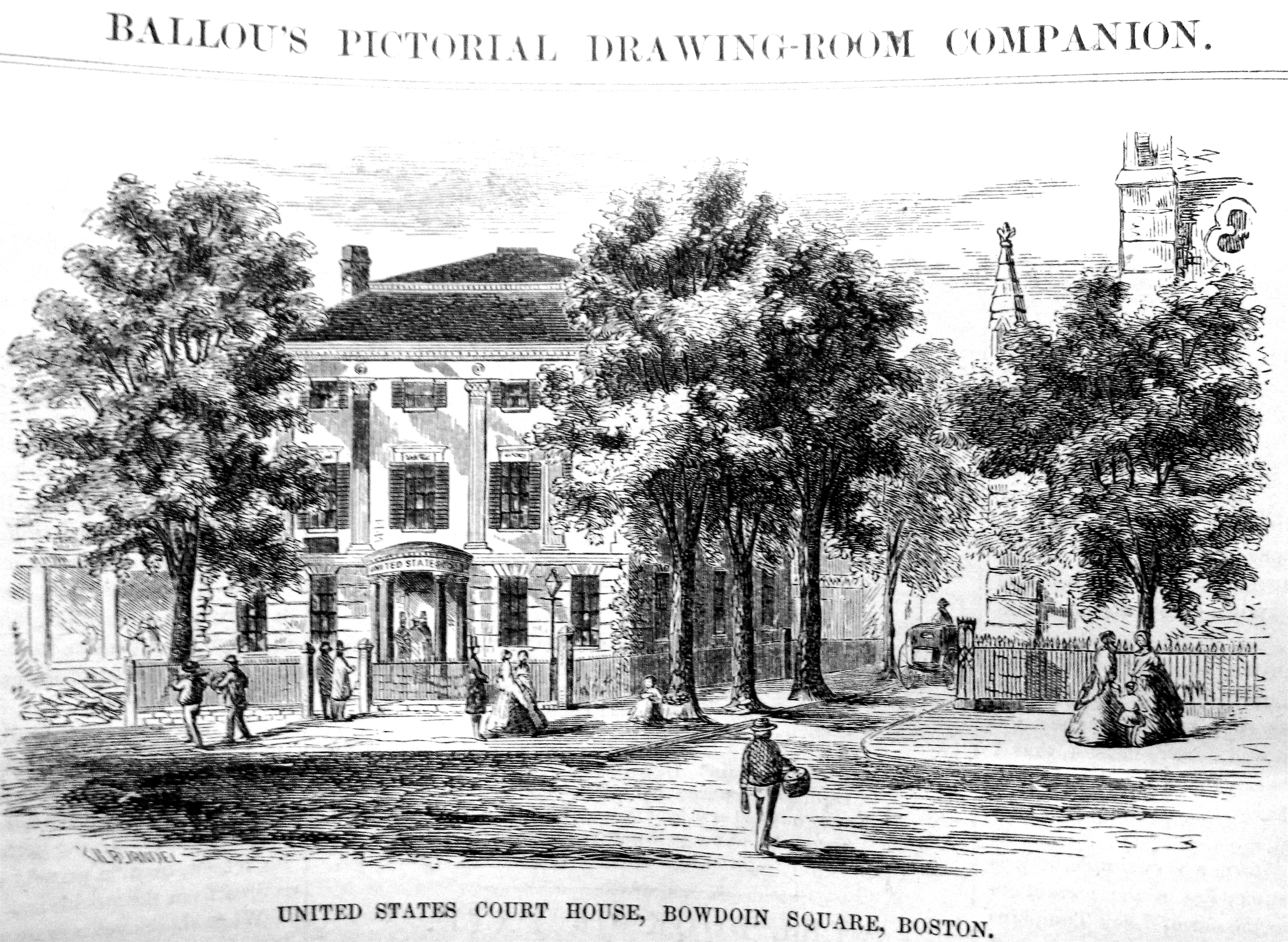
U.S. Court House, Bowdoin Square, c. 1856; engraving by Samuel Smith Kilburn, Ballou's Pictorial

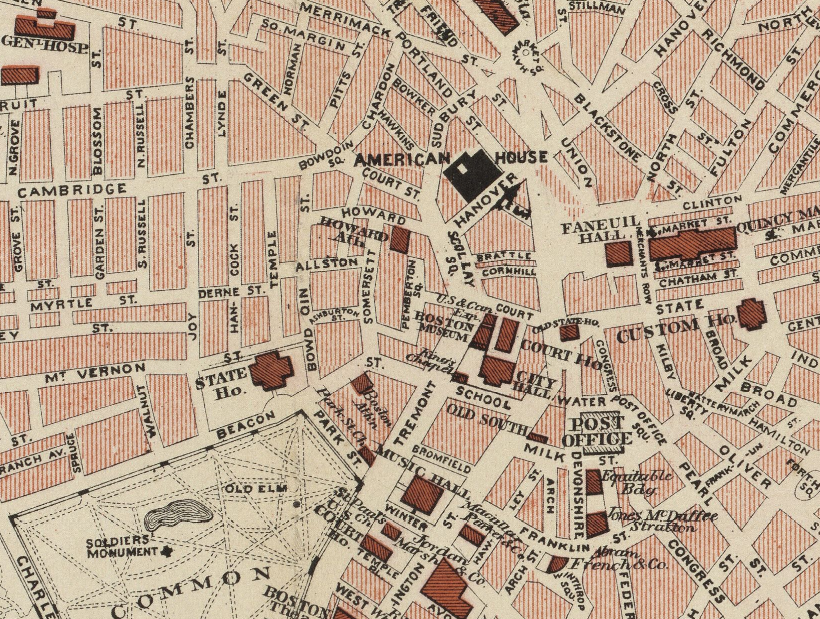
Detail of 1883 map of Boston, showing Bowdoin Square at intersection of Green, Chardon, Court, Bowdoin and Cambridge Streets

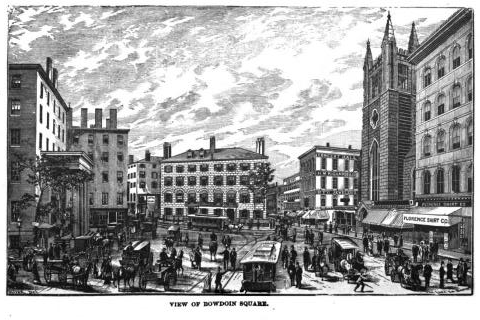
1883

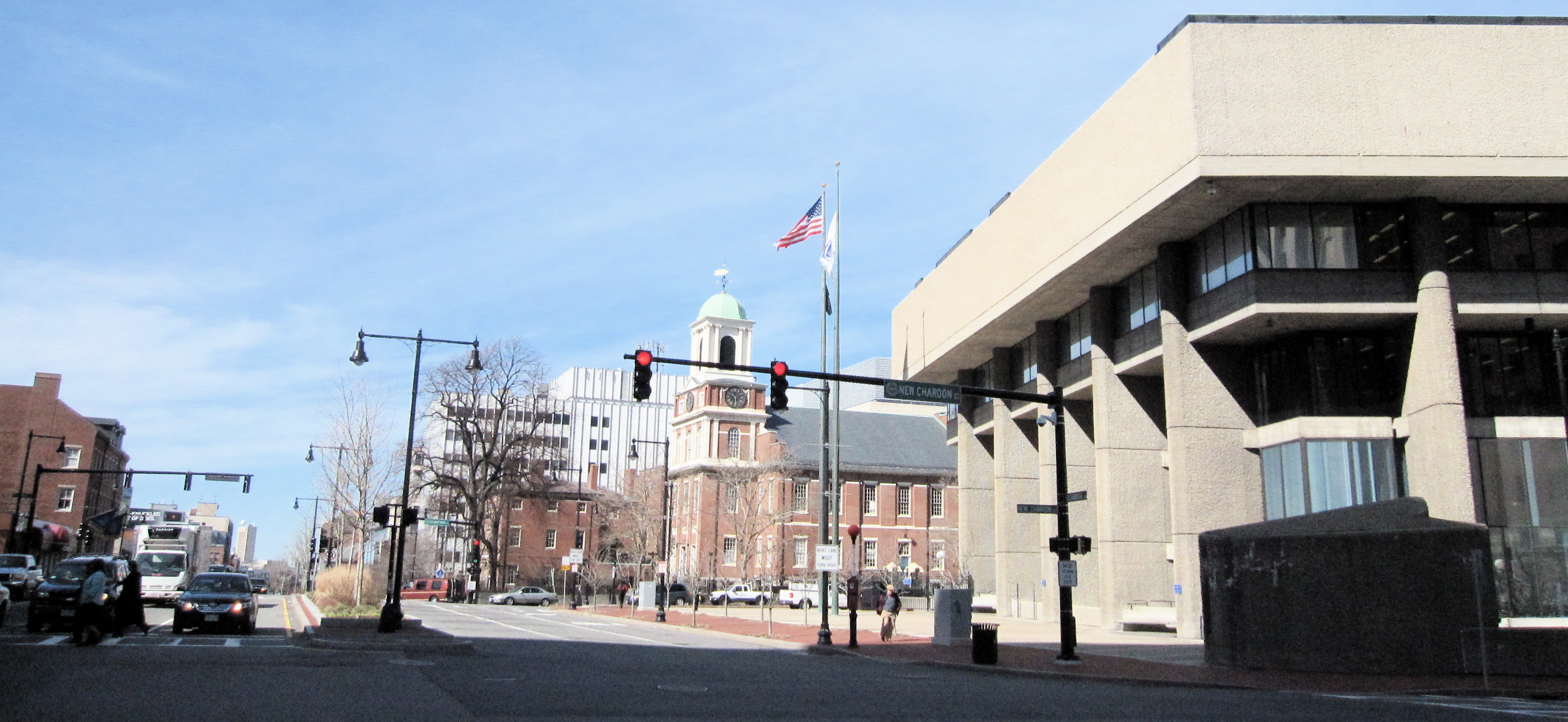
Intersection of Cambridge, New Chardon and Bowdoin Streets, Boston, 2010
