= New Chardon Street =

Street in Boston, Massachusetts

Coordinates: 42°21′44.97″N 71°3′42.33″W

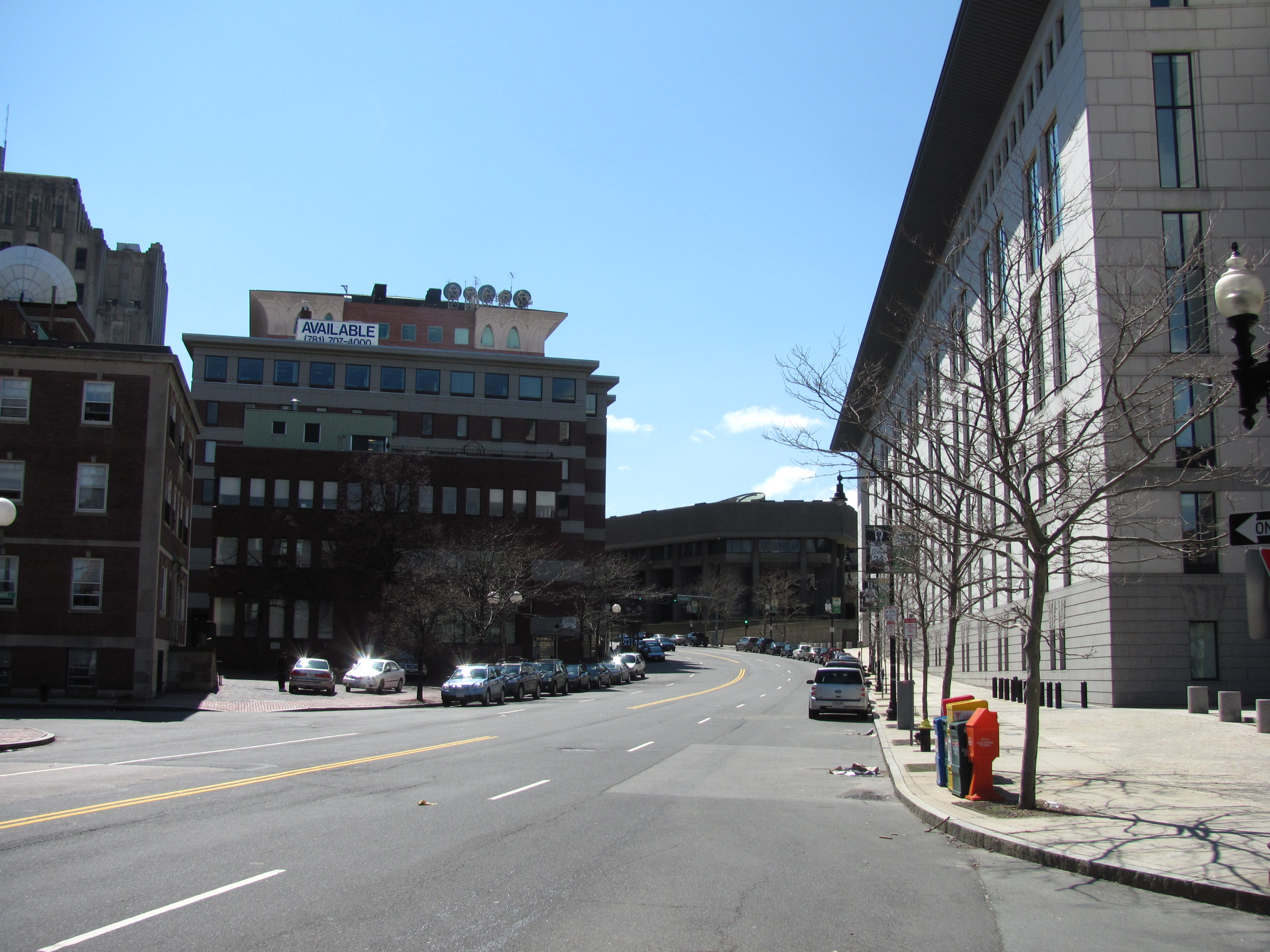
- New Chardon Street
- Interactive map of New Chardon Street
- Location: Boston
- West end: Cambridge Street
- East end: I-93

New Chardon Street is a street in downtown Boston, Massachusetts, United States, north of Government Center. It begins at Cambridge Street at Bowdoin Square, across from Bowdoin Street. The two-way street continues east across Congress Street, ending at Haymarket Square with access to the Sumner and Callahan Tunnels (Route 1A) and the Central Artery (I-93/U.S. 1/Route 3), as well as local access to Washington Street North and the Surface Artery.

== History ==
New Chardon Street was originally Chardon Street, connecting Bowdoin Square to Merrimac and Portland Streets (where Congress Street now intersects). The street was originally "laid out through the Parker-Gerrish pasture in 1682. It was called "the highway to Jackson's distill house," "the lane to the mill pond," and in 1785, "Chardon's lane." Chardon Street was named after a Huguenot descendant, Peter Chardon, who acquired the property on the street in 1733 and "built a house on the corner of the street bearing his name. He was a man of polished manners, and an influential merchant of the old time. A school-house was erected in 1804, at the corner of Chardon and Hawkins Streets." Hawkins Street was also the site of many distilling houses.

In the nineteenth century, Chardon street was home to Chardon Street Chapel (1838), a large church founded by Joshua V. Himes, an early leader of the Advent Christian Church.

The full length of the street had streetcar tracks added between 1872 and 1874; they were gone by 1925.

The street stayed in the same configuration until the 1960s, when Government Center was built and the streets in the area were reconfigured. Chardon Street was realigned and renamed New Chardon Street, made one-way westbound, and extended east to Washington Street North and the Central Artery as a continuation of Cross Street.

As part of the Big Dig in the early 2000s, the road was made two-way, along with easier access to the Sumner and Callahan Tunnels at its east end provided by new ramps.

== See also ==
- Boston Housing Court
- Bowdoin Square (Boston)
- Government Service Center (Boston)
