= Edward W. Brooke Courthouse =

Courthouse in Boston, Massachusetts

Coordinates: 42.362980°N 71.061657°W

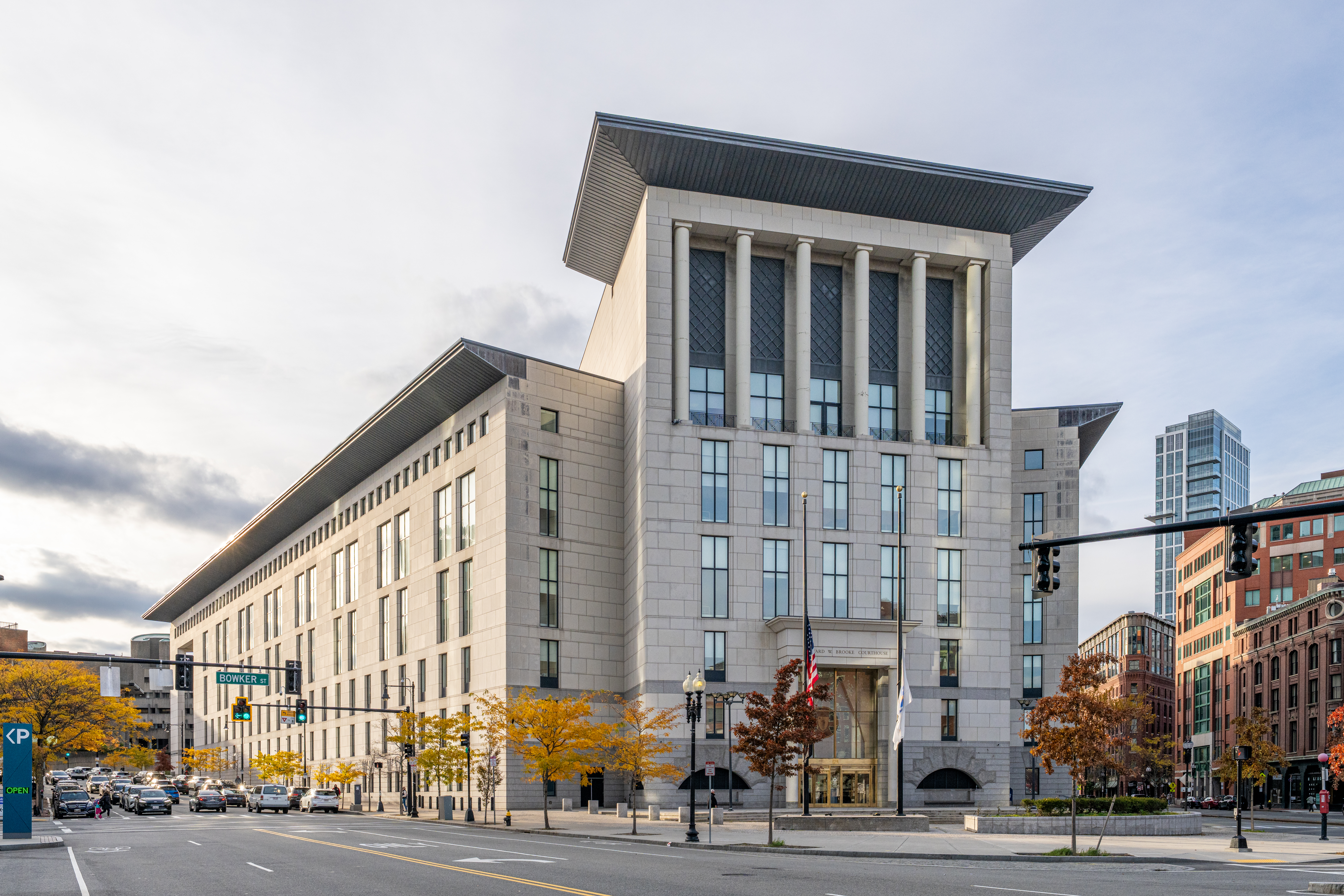
The Edward W. Brooke Courthouse

The Edward W. Brooke Courthouse is a city courthouse in Boston, Massachusetts. The courthouse, part of the Boston Government Service Center, was built in 1998. It holds the Central Division of the Boston Municipal Court, as well as the court's administrative offices. The building was designed by Kallmann McKinnell & Wood and is named after Edward W. Brooke.

The first departments moved into the space in January 1999. They were to include: the Suffolk Registry of Deeds, the Land Court, the Probate and Family Court, the Housing Court, and the Juvenile Court.

== See also ==
- List of courthouses in Boston
