= Bowdoin Street =

Street in Boston, Massachusetts

Coordinates: 42.3597°N 71.0629°W

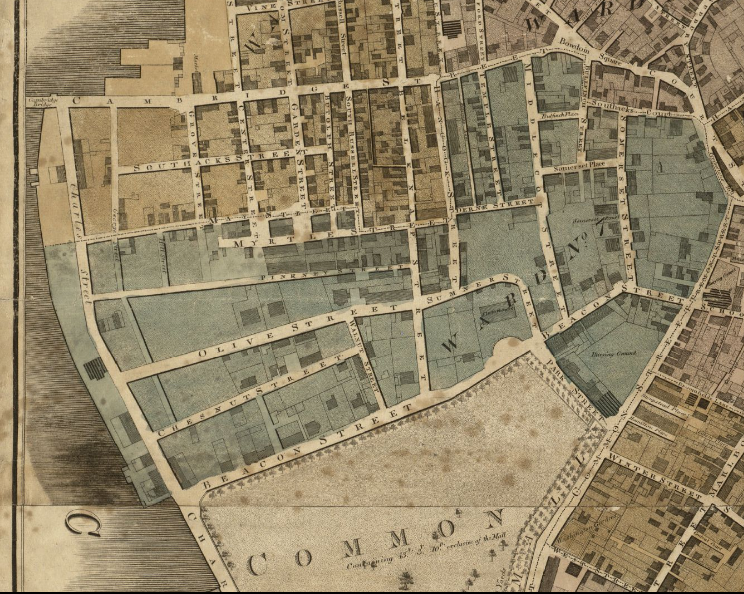
- Detail of 1814 map of Boston, showing Middlecott St. (later Bowdoin St.)
- Location: Boston
- South end: Erie Avenue
- North end: Hillside Road

Bowdoin Street in Boston, Massachusetts, extends from the top of Beacon Street, down Beacon Hill to Cambridge Street, near the West End. It was originally called "Middlecott Street" as early as the 1750s. In 1805 it was renamed after the Governor James Bowdoin.

== Location and description ==
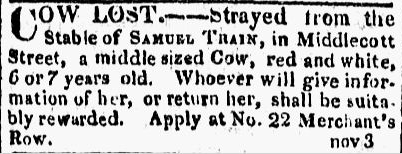
Advertisement for lost cow, Middlecott St. (later Bowdoin St.), 1818

Bowdoin is situated on the north side of Beacon Hill, and runs north to south. It is primarily a residential street. Topographically, Bowdoin Street is a hill from Cambridge Street at the bottom to its north, and Beacon Street at the top to its south.

== Residences ==
The street is flanked on both sides by apartment complexes. Lindsay Place dominates the western side, with four buildings built in 1886 which are protected historic buildings. Bowdoin Place, completed in 2003, extends along the street's eastern half.

In the 18th century Governor James Bowdoin lived at the corner of Beacon and Bowdoin Streets. He had "one of the largest gardens of that day [in Boston], ... a large house and an extensive lot of land. ... He had a garden abounding in the finest fruits—pears and peaches, apples and grapes." At the turn of the 19th century, Joseph Coolidge, Sr., lived here in a large house built by architect Charles Bulfinch. Bulfinch himself lived on Bowdoin Street, briefly. From 1946 to his death, John F. Kennedy kept an apartment at 122 Bowdoin Street.

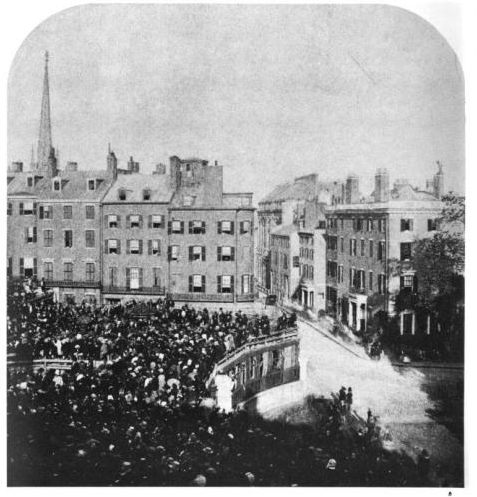
Top of Bowdoin St., at Beacon St., during dedication of Daniel Webster statue, State House, 1859

== Government buildings ==
The Massachusetts State House faces Beacon Street with several entrances from Bowdoin Street. Ashburton Place, which contains other state and local offices, is also accessible from Bowdoin.

== Businesses ==
The few businesses on Bowdoin are restaurants, including Grotto (between 33 and 45 Bowdoin) and the Dunkin' Donuts at the corner. Duck-Boat operators' patter refers to the coffee shop as "the only place in town where you can get a cappuccino and sushi at once." The Osaka Sushi place shares the building with the doughnut shop and a deli.

There are two bars on the street. At the north end, the Red Hat, known for its pitchers of Mud Slides and other frozen drinks, is referred to as "Old Scollay's Red Hat." The other bar, at the south end, is the "Twenty-First Amendment," named for the Constitutional amendment to repeal alcohol prohibition in the United States.

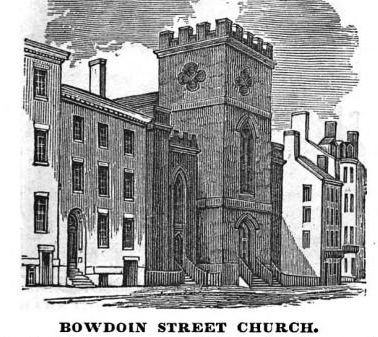
Bowdoin Street Church, built 1831

== Church ==
St. John the Evangelist Episcopal Church is on Bowdoin Street. Solomon Willard designed it. "The church building, made of stone in a gothic style, was erected in 1831 by Congregationalist Christians. From 1863–83, it was occupied by the Church of the Advent (which afterwards moved to its current location on Brimmer Street). In 1883, the building became the Mission Church of St. John the Evangelist under the auspices of the Society of St. John the Evangelist, a monastic order. After building a new monastery on Memorial Drive in Cambridge, the SSJE brothers continued their mission work at St. John's. In 1985, almost a century after the brothers established the mission church here, St. John's became a Parish Church in the Episcopal Diocese of Massachusetts."

== The Square ==
Bowdoin Square was put to rest in about 1955, but lives on as a subway station, called appropriately, "Bowdoin." It is at one end of the Blue Line of the MBTA.

== Gallery ==
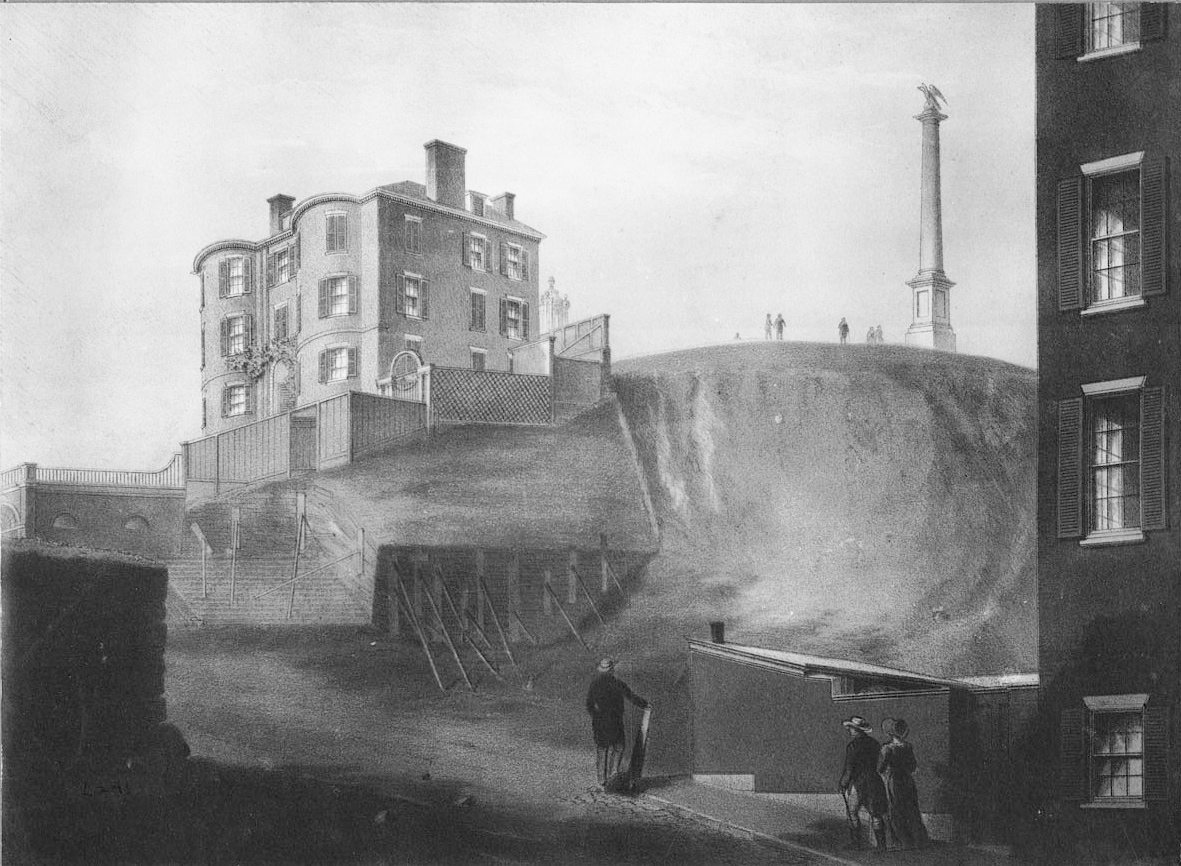
Beacon Hill, with Mr. Thurston's house, from Bowdoin Street, ca.1811

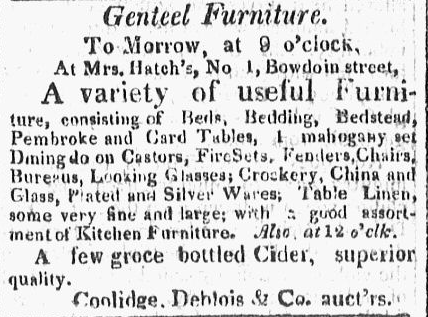
Advertisement for furniture auction, 1816

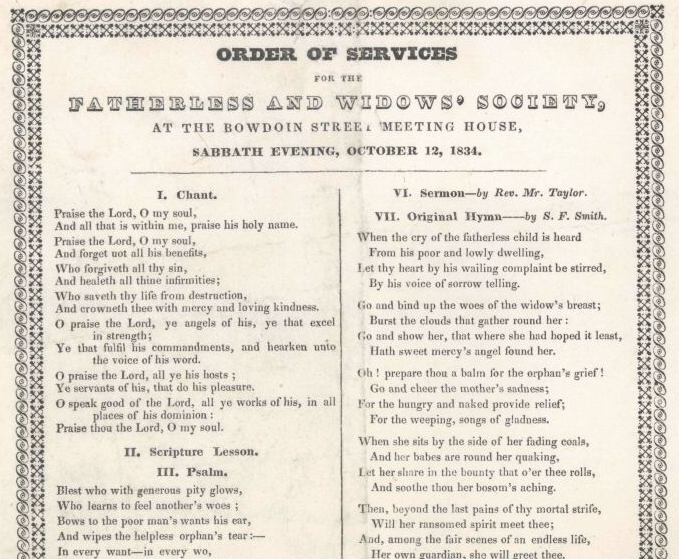
Order of services for the Fatherless and Widows' Society, Bowdoin Street Meeting House, 1834

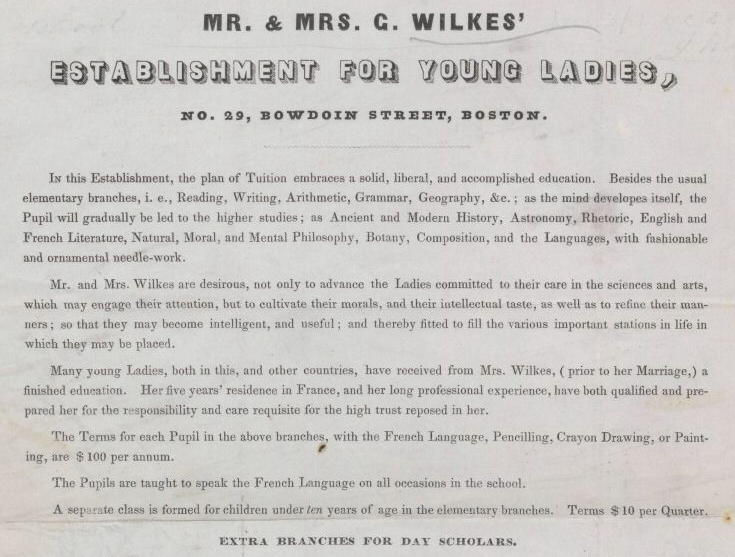
Mr. & Mrs. Wilkes' establishment for young ladies, 1845

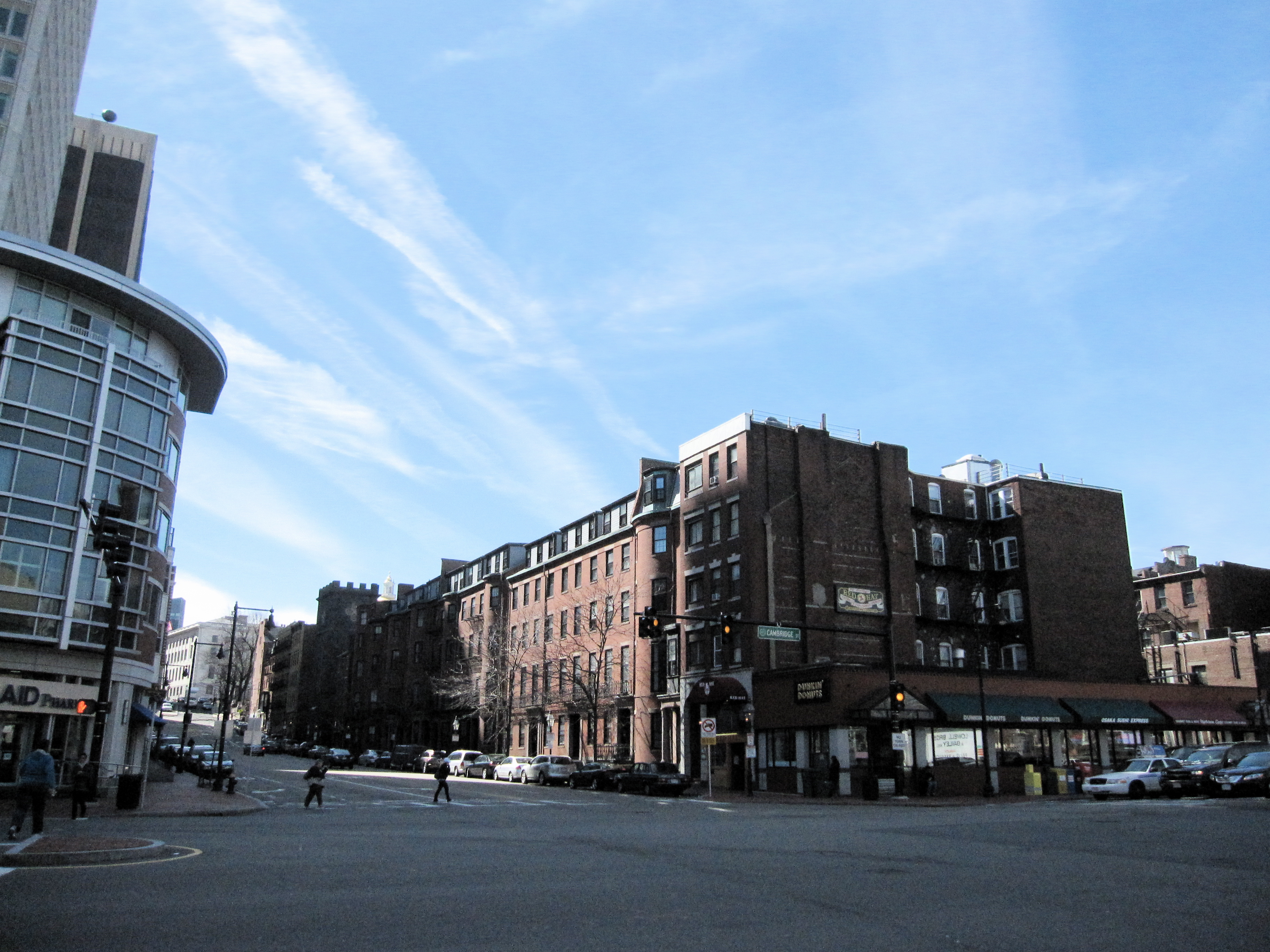
Corner of Cambridge St. and Bowdoin St., 2010

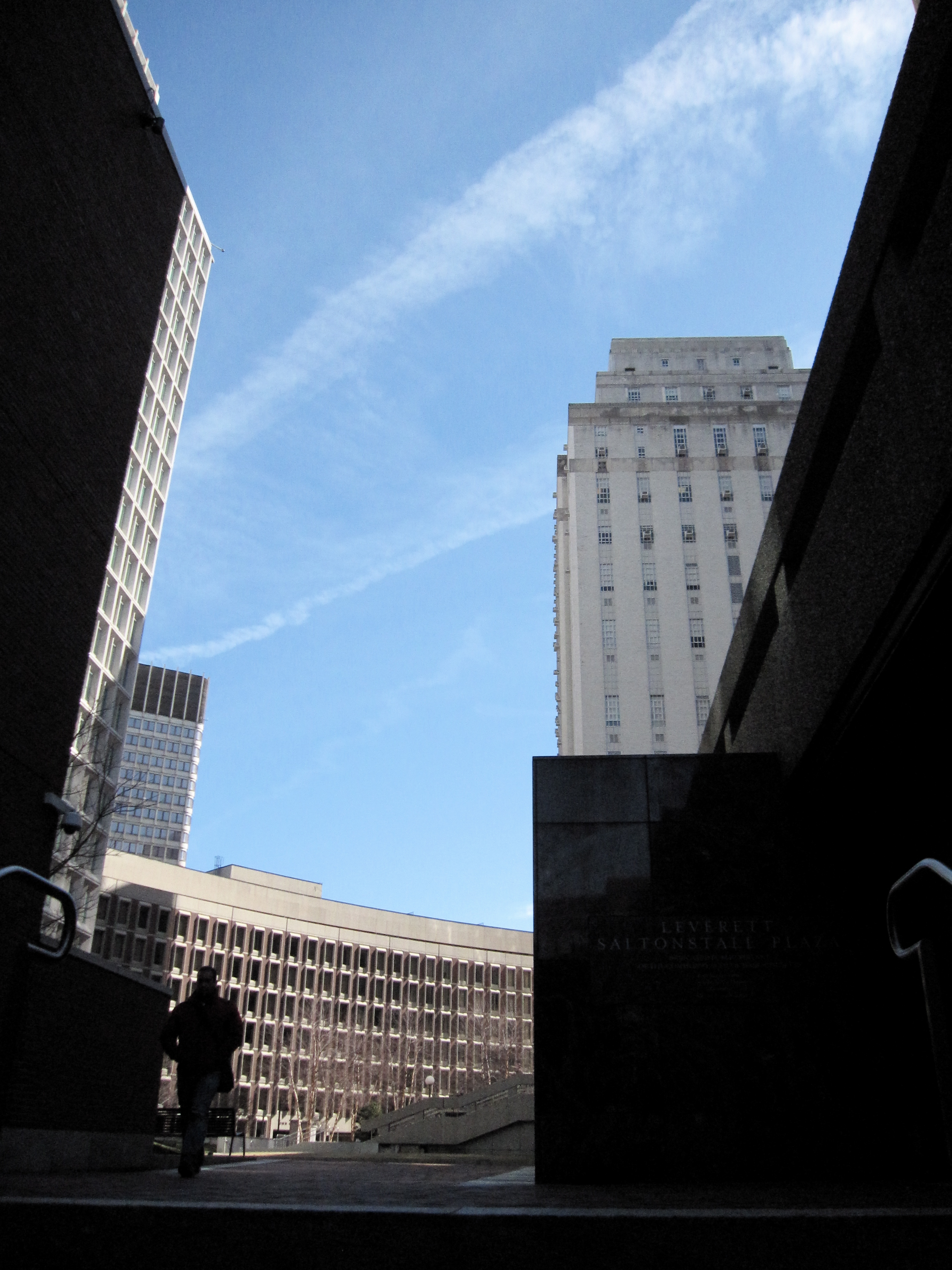
Leverett Saltonstall Place, off of Bowdoin St., 2010

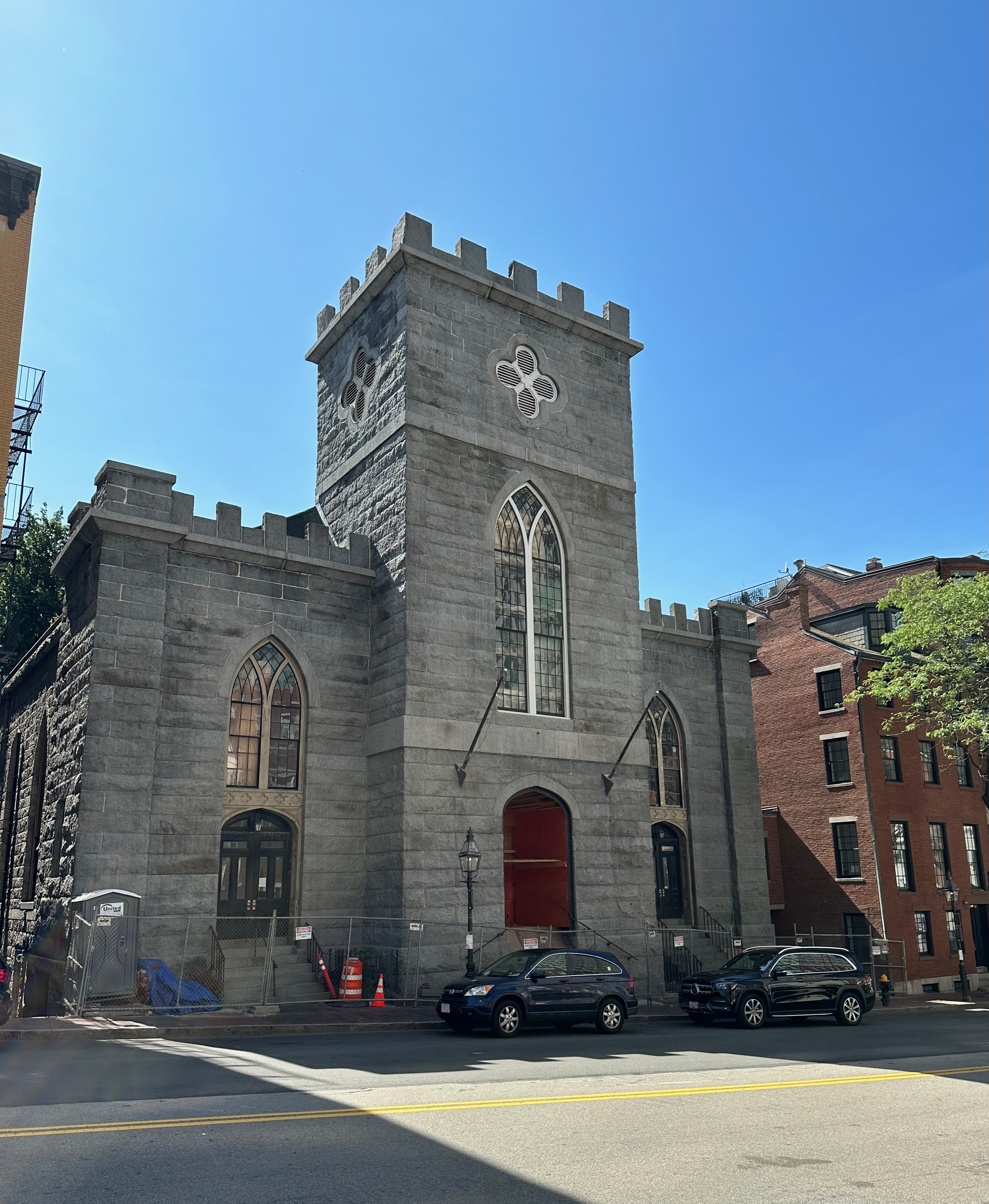
Bowdoin Street Church in 2023
