= Dreaming Emmett =

1986 play by Toni Morrison

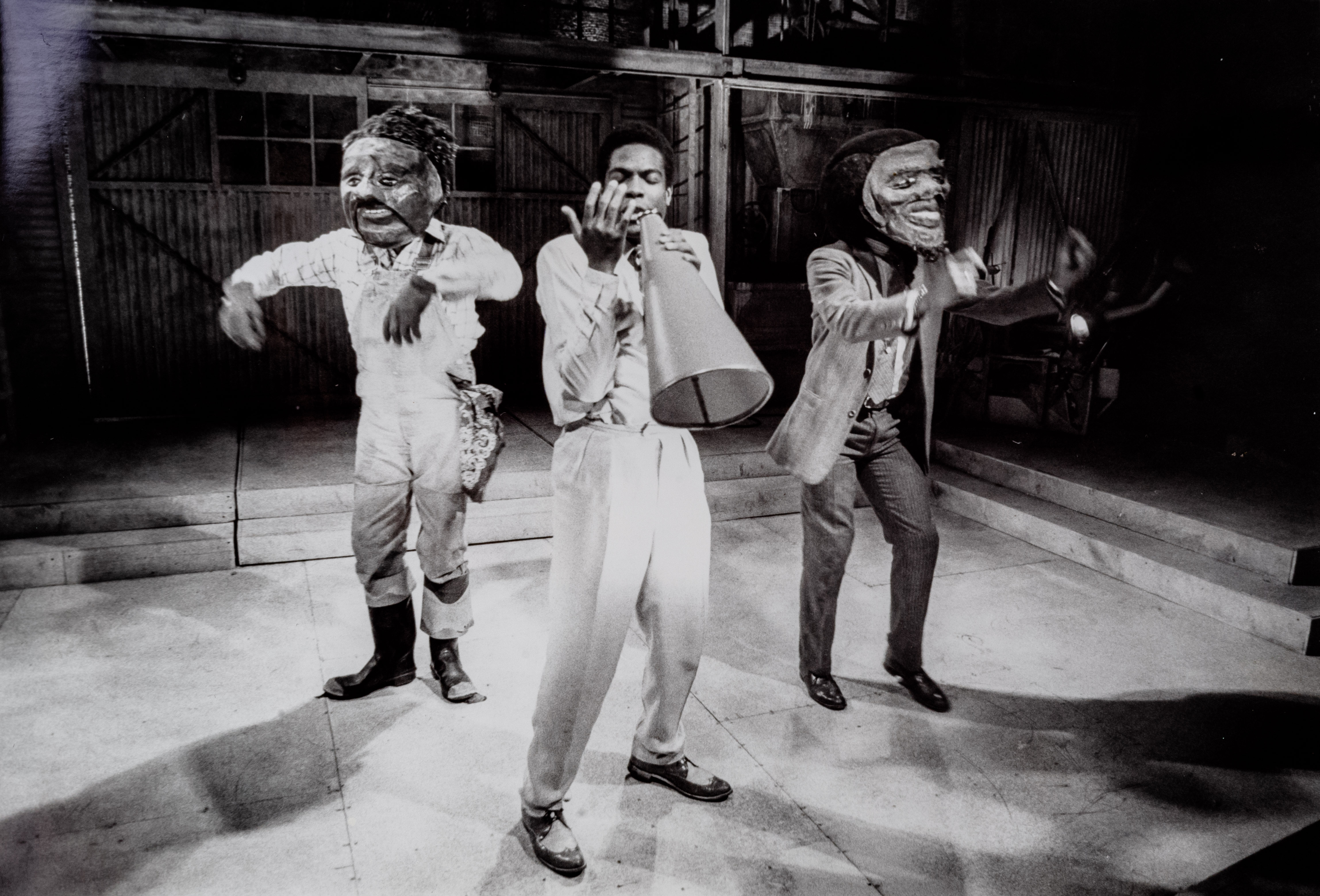
- Original language: English
- Written by: Toni Morrison
- Characters: Emmett; Princess; Eustace; George; Ma; Major; Buck; Tamara
- Subject: Emmett Till
- Genre: Drama
- Setting: Money, Mississippi

Premiere
- Date: January 5, 1986
- Place: Capital Repertory Theatre, Albany, NY

Dreaming Emmett is the debut play by American writer Toni Morrison. First performed in 1986, it was commissioned by the New York State Writers Institute at SUNY-Albany. The play's world premiere, directed by Gilbert Moses, took place on January 5, 1986, at Capital Repertory Theatre in Albany, New York for a four-week run.

The play is a poetic exploration of Emmett Till, in which Till, in surreal and dreamlike sequences, confronts other people from his life, including his murderers, seeking to make sense of his needless death. In the second act, a character emerges from the audience to address Emmett and pivot the play into a more didactic direction.

In March 1986, Mario Cuomo and Kitty Carlisle Hart presented Morrison with the New York State Governor's Arts Award for Dreaming Emmett and other works.

== Development ==
The play was commissioned by the New York State Writers Institute and the Capital District Humanities Program at SUNY-Albany, to commemorate the first celebration of Martin Luther King, Jr. Day. The Institute and its related programming were supported by Governor Mario Cuomo and the state legislature as a way to establish Albany as a destination for the development of quality writers. Program director Kathryn Gibson suggested to Morrison that she write a play, an endeavor that Morrison had been interested in pursuing for some time. Although she was a frequent reader of plays, she rarely attended the theatre.

The play is often described as Morrison's first attempt at playwriting, though she had written the book and lyrics for New Orleans, a musical that received a six-week workshop production in 1982 and staged readings at New York Shakespeare Festival in 1984.

When asked by an interviewer about her transition to writing plays, she said: "I keep asking Bill Kennedy to find one American who wrote novels first and then successful plays. Just one. And neither he nor I could come up with any one American. Even Henry James was a failure. He tried it three times and each time it was worse than the other. But I feel I have a strong point. I write good dialogue. It's theatrical. It moves. It just doesn't hang there." Morrison, who also acknowledged the tension between writer and director as different from the solo pursuit of a novelist, wrote the play in the midst of developing her 1987 novel Beloved (which would go on to win the Pulitzer Prize in 1988). The play utilized dreams as a framework to tackle the subject, echoing her belief in the cathartic power of dream and nightmare. She selected Gilbert Moses as a director because she considered him to be sympathetic to the material, with a forceful perspective on shaping the play, as opposed to other directors who might be "mere facilitators". The dream within a dream structure also supported her goal to bring Emmett Till to life on stage, instead of retelling the circumstances of his death.

"This area has a strong history of abolitionism that has surfaced over and over again in the literature of Black people. There's an old, established Black community here," Morrison told the Amsterdam News. "This is also a professional, white collar city. it has all the tensions that exist in cities with Blacks and whites living together. Albany wasn't invented by Wall Street, it's not a resort town, it's not a bedroom community. I wanted to do the play here. I needed a certain kind of space in which to start this production. I wanted a community response. New York means theater-goers primarily. I wanted the response of neighborhood people."

== Production ==
In November 1984, Writers Institute director Tom Smith met with Morrison and Capital Rep artistic directors Bruce Bouchard and Peter Clough, to propose that Morrison's play be produced at the theatre. They greenlit the project without seeing the script.

Auditions took place at the New Dramatists building on West 44th Street in New York City. Present were Bouchard, Moses and Morrison. They auditioned more than 30 people on the first day alone. Joseph Phillips, eventually selected for the lead role, wasn't scheduled to audition. Lorraine Toussaint, eventually cast in the role of Tamara, was ill with flu and Moses interrupted her reading to have her skip to another section.

In fall 1985, sculptor Willa Shalit was contracted by Morrison and Gilbert Moses to develop a series of masks for the show. Moses was originally unsure about the idea of masks, but Morrison insisted on the device. Some of the masks were small, lifelike masks in latex, while others were large, oversized grotesque heads worn by the actors over a wire mesh headgear. Shalit had previously met artistic director Bruce Bouchard while working on a project at Radio City Music Hall, and contributed a death mask for Capital Repertory Theatre's production of The Wake of Jamie Foster.

Designer Dale F. Jordan was a frequent artist at the theatre, having joined the company during its days as Lexington Conservatory Theatre in the late 1970s. The design process began as an exchange of sketches and ideas with Gilbert Moses, emphasizing abstract imagery and dreamscapes, later refined to be more concrete and suggestive of dream, rather than attempting to depict all the aspects of the fantasy. Elements such as a complex scene involving a chair that consumes Emmett in a surrealistic way were revised to be less complicated.

Driven by Moses' increasingly elaborate concepts and backed by Morrison, costs increased. Moses, versed in spending from Broadway-style productions, met resistance from the theatre's production team and their more modest financial resources. The production's co-funders agreed to increase the budget to accommodate the shortfall.

== Synopsis ==
Emmett, a 14-year-old boy, begins by reminiscing about how he spent his summer vacation in August, 1955, gradually revealing that he is the spirit of the murdered Emmett Till, engaged in a dreamlike state of thought. In surreal scenes, he interacts with a variety of characters, some donning masks to represent different stages in the characters' lives. He talks to his young Black friends from 1955, George and Eustace, and to his mother, Ma. He confronts Princess, the woman he accosted, and Major and Buck, the white men responsible for his murder.

Tamara, a Black girl, gets up from the theatre audience and walks onstage, disrupting the scene. The characters are confused because she is not part of their narrative, and exists outside Emmett's dream. Tamara confronts each of the characters, including Emmett, with her contemporary perspective, including gender power dynamics. Emmett reveals that he may not actually be Emmett Till; instead, he may be another murdered boy who dreams he is Emmett Till. The characters discuss how they perhaps didn't know the real Emmett Till. Emmett, who has built a kite, flies the kite as he exits. Tamara returns to her seat in the audience.

=== Cast ===
- Emmett - Joseph C. Phillips
- Princess - Peggy Cowles
- Eustace - Mel Winkler
- George - Herb Downer
- Ma - Beatrice Winde
- Major - Frank Stoeger
- Buck - Larry Golden
- Tamara - Lorraine Toussaint

=== Crew ===
- Director - Gilbert Moses
- Scenic and Lighting Designer - Dale F. Jordan
- Mask Design - Willa Shalit
- Costume Design - Lloyd K. Waiwaiole
- Mask/Movement - Constance Valis Hill
- Mask Design and Construction Assistants - Stacy Morse, Marlene Marda, Shelley Wyant
- Voice Consultant - Lorraine Toussaint
- Assistant to Ms. Shalit - Debra Paitchel
- Composer/Sound Design - Kevin Bartlett
- Production Stage Manager - Patricia Frey
- Technical Director - David Yergan
- Properties Master - Janet Storck
- Producing Artistic Directors - Bruce Bouchard, Peter Clough

== Premiere ==
The public premiere of Dreaming Emmett took place on January 5, 1986. It was followed by a reception at the Steuben Athletic Club. "The reception was nearly over at 7:30 when a beaming Morrison arrived and strode through the room to bravos and applause," said the Albany Times Union. The event included remarks by Morrison, director Gilbert Moses and William Kennedy. "I think the play will make racial as well as theatrical headlines," Kennedy said. "...it raises issues I've never seen raised before." In attendance was Gene Shalit, Willa Shalit, Albany Mayor Thomas Michael Whalen III, SUNY Chancellor Clifton R. Wharton Jr., assemblymember William F. Passannante, publisher Dardis McNamee, and two Broadway producers—Michel Stuart and Barbara Ligeti-Hewlitt, among others.

=== Related events ===
The Capital District Humanities Program, a co-funder of the production, organized Protest Progress: Black History Through Literature, a series of regional events surrounding Dreaming Emmett, featuring Black writers and guest lecturers.

- Prophecy and Power of Political Theater - a post-show series at Capital Repertory Theatre included lectures by Gilbert Moses, historian Lerone Bennett Jr., scholar Hortense Spillers and playwright Amiri Baraka.
- Words of the Black Experience - a lecture series hosted at schools in Albany, Schenectady and Troy included Gwendolyn Brooks, Alvin Poussaint and Toni Cade Bambara.
- From Slavery to Civil Rights - a three-month reading series of Black authors hosted by libraries throughout the region.

== Critical reception ==
The play received positive to mixed reviews, with praise for Morrison's language but criticism of the form and production The play has a unique style and form. Margaret Croyden, in her review of Dreaming Emmett for the New York Times, noted the control of Till's imagination on the play's elements and complex structural motifs, such as a play within a play, and creation of a "non-naturalistic" and "nonlinear" narrative. The Saratogian praised the sensory, poetic details of the dialog and the dramatic craft of the first act, but considered the second act to be unsatisfying dry and academic. By contrast, Bob Goepfert of The Knickerbocker News disliked the first act but praised the second. The entrance of Tamara at the end of the first act in particular galvanized the energy of the production. Goepfert praised Morrison's writing skills, despite her inexperience with drama, as compelling, expressing ideas that linger in profound ways. Critic Dan DiNicola described it as "confused and confusing" but appreciated Morrison's sharp dialog. Variety echoed this critique, calling it "verbose, redundant and confusing," though it praised Joseph C. Phillips' performance and the production values of the theatre.

Albany journalist Martin P. Kelly praised the importance of the work but criticized "...theatricality that gets between the audience and the theme." Kelly noted good performances and remarked that the play "raises an issue but does not provide intriguing drama. There is no real plot and the characterizations are generally superficial." The Amsterdam News applauded a "first-rate cast" and the "ingenious" direction of Gilbert Moses. Morrison also spoke of the significance of locating the production in Albany.

Other press found it a profound experience. "In the end we are not left with a feeling of completeness, rather we are left with a clearer knowledge of the conflicts and the problems that are continuing on the stage of life. For this I would recommend Dreaming Emmett," said a review in Concordiesis. "A two-act, one-set eight-character intensely theatrical experience, the play has a convoluted plot line that moves across time past and present and unravels like an onion," said The Berkshire Eagle. "Every layer seems necessary to the shape and sense of the play and our reaction to it, but at the end, when all has unraveled, we have nothing solid left to remember or set our minds to rest upon. And this is both the tantalizing strength and the disturbing force of the play's intentions." Metroland found the acting ensemble to be among the best the theatre had produced, finding fault mainly with the extraneous production elements that distracted from the play's core drama. The Troy Sunday Record also praised the play.

Scholar Hortense Spillers, speaking at a post-performance lecture at the theatre in Albany, praised the play, which she noted was not representational of the story of Emmett Till, but an exploration of deeper issues through the use of poetic literary devices and theatrical expressionism. She pointed to the masks as "overwhelming" the play with their shocking reveal and distortion of space, manifesting Till's internal perspectives.

Spillers also recalled her personal connection to the subject, as being close in age to Till (she was born a year later than him) and that his murder was a personal awakening for her. "The killers of Emmett Till are as much objects of myth...as is Emmett himself," she said. The play questions whether either Black or white people can escape from their own mythologies. "We are trapped inside each others dreams, that are in fact a nightmare." The dream metaphor, said Spillers, is central to the play's meaning, and it is a collective one. "We do not dream alone."

More recently, Princeton scholar Rhaisa Williams analyzed the usage of dreams and dreaming motifs, as found within a version of the script predating the 1986 production version. She posits that the dreaming structure allowed Morrison flexibility to engage with the subject matter, avoiding the "commemoration machine" that might otherwise overshadow her themes. Williams also examines how the character of Tamara reacts to and confronts the Emmett character in an unexpected and abrasive way, disrupting audience sympathies.

== Legacy ==
Members of the production described it as difficult, with tensions between the director and the theatre staff. Producing Artistic Director Bruce Bouchard described Morrison as "tough, but fair" in guarding her work, but criticized the director's extravagant and costly production as overshadowing the nuance of the play's language. Cast and crew struggled with Moses' working methods and behavior. The play was a significant box office success, however, and the theatre's best-selling show that decade.

Morrison retained numerous copies and drafts of the play, despite later reports that she had destroyed them. After the premiere, she attempted to have the play produced at other venues, including Paris and Lincoln Center, but no full production ever emerged. Morrison considered the play unfinished.

In 2018, director Daniel Banks received permission from Morrison to conduct a workshop of the play with students. He noted that there were multiple versions and revisions of the script, including versions with different character names and somewhat different endings. A selection of scenes was performed at the 2019 symposium "Performing Morrison", read by students at Washington University in St. Louis. A a staged reading was produced at the University of West Georgia in 2020, also directed by Daniel Banks.

In February 2020, University at Albany, SUNY presented an exhibit commemorating Morrison's work in Albany. It displayed items related to her time as a professor as well as the Dreaming Emmett project.
