= Janet Nkubana =

Rwandan basket weaver

- Born: Eastern Province, Rwanda
- Occupations: Social entrepreneur, business executive, basket weaver
- Known for: Co-founding Gahaya Links; Promoting "Peace Baskets"
- Title: Co-founder and COO of Gahaya Links
- Awards: Africa Prize for Leadership for the Sustainable End of Hunger (2008)

Janet Nkubana is a basket weaver from Rwanda. She is known for her work coordinating the efforts of women in Rwanda to make baskets that are sold in the United States.

== Early life ==
Nkubana grew up in a refugee camp in Uganda because of the Rwandan genocide. She was first exposed to basket weaving in the refugee camp, watching her mother and other women make baskets. As she grew older, Nkubana and her sister Joy Ndungutse ran a restaurant in the capital city of Uganda, Kampala. Nkubana then ran a hotel in the capital city of Rwanda, Kigali. Nkubana had a background in art and remembers seeing her mother and other women in her community weaving when she was young.

== Career ==
Janet Nkubana is the creator of a company called "Gahaya Links" along with her sister Joy Ndungutse. The company was created in 2003 and incorporated in 2004. They hired women who had been widowed during the Rwandan genocide in 1994. She began selling these baskets at flea markets and began exporting them to Uganda, Kenya, Tanzania, and the United States. Gahaya Links partnered with EDImports to create baskets for the U.S.A. market. In 2004 Gahaya Links made 12,000 baskets for markets in the United States and sales totaled more than $50,000 USD. In 2005 "Gahaya Links" connected with Willa Shalit to form a partnership with the retail store Macy's. The first shipment of product sold out in less than a month in Macy's stores.

As of 2012, Nkubana employed more than 4000 women working in making baskets. Some call the baskets made by Nkubana's company 'peace baskets' because the women making the baskets come from tribes that were at war in the 1994 genocide.

== Awards and honors ==
In 2008, Nkubana shared the Africa Prize for Leadership for the Sustainable End of Hunger with Faiza Jama Mohamed. She was the 2008 Africa Prize laureate.
