= Anthony Lewis =

American journalist (1927–2013)

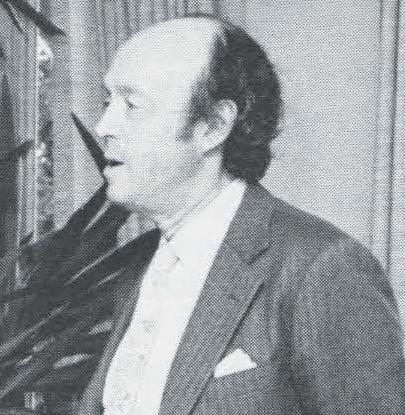
- Lewis in 1985
- Born: Joseph Anthony Lewis; March 27, 1927; New York City, U.S.
- Died: March 25, 2013 (aged 85); Cambridge, Massachusetts, U.S.
- Education: Harvard University (AB)
- Occupation: Journalist
- Known for: Pulitzer Prize for National Reporting (1955)
- Spouses: Linda J. Rannells (m. 1951; div. 1982); Margaret H. Marshall (m. 1984)
- Children: 3
- Relatives: Gene Shalit (brother-in-law); Willa Shalit (niece-in-law)

Joseph Anthony Lewis (March 27, 1927 – March 25, 2013) was an American public intellectual and journalist. He was a two-time winner of the Pulitzer Prize and was a columnist for The New York Times. He is credited with creating the field of legal journalism in the United States.

Early in Lewis' career as a legal journalist, Supreme Court Justice Felix Frankfurter told an editor of The New York Times: "I can't believe what this young man achieved. There are not two justices of this court who have such a grasp of these cases." At his death, Nicholas B. Lemann, the dean of Columbia University School of Journalism, said: "At a liberal moment in American history, he was one of the defining liberal voices."

== Early life ==
Lewis was born Joseph Anthony Lewis in New York City on March 27, 1927, to Kassel Lewis, who worked in textiles manufacturing, and Sylvia Surut, who became director of the nursery school at the 92nd Street Y. He and his family were Jewish. He attended the Horace Mann School in the Bronx, where he was a classmate of Roy Cohn, and graduated from Harvard College in 1948. While at Harvard, he was managing editor of The Harvard Crimson.

== Career in journalism ==
Following his college graduation, Lewis worked for The New York Times. He left in 1952 to work for the Democratic National Committee on Adlai Stevenson's presidential campaign. He returned to journalism at The Washington Daily News, an afternoon tabloid. He wrote a series of articles on the case of Abraham Chasanow, a civilian employee of the U.S. Navy, who had been dismissed from his job on the basis of allegations by anonymous informers that he associated with anti-American subversives. The series won Lewis a Pulitzer Prize for National Reporting in 1955.

Lewis returned to The New York Times that year as its Washington bureau chief. He was assigned to cover the Justice Department and the Supreme Court. In 1956–57 he was a Nieman Fellow at Harvard Law School. He won a second Pulitzer Prize in 1963, again in the category National Reporting, for his coverage of the U.S. Supreme Court. The citation singled out his coverage of the court's reasoning in Baker v. Carr, a Supreme Court decision which held that federal courts could exercise authority over legislative redistricting on the part of the states, and the decision's impact on specific states.

In his 1969 history of The New York Times, Gay Talese described Lewis in his Washington years as "cool, lean, well-scrubbed looking, intense and brilliant". Lewis became a member of Senator Robert F. Kennedy's social circle, too conspicuously so in the opinion of Max Frankel, another of the paper's editors.

During a four-month newspaper strike (November 1962 to February 1963), Lewis wrote Gideon's Trumpet, the story of Clarence Earl Gideon, the plaintiff in Gideon v. Wainwright, the 1963 case in which the Supreme Court held that states were required to provide counsel for indigent defendants charged with serious crimes. At Lewis' death it had not been out of print since it was first published. It won the 1965 Edgar Award for Best Fact Crime and in 1980 was adapted as a movie for television and presented by Hallmark Hall of Fame. Lewis played a small role in the film.

Lewis published a second book in 1964, Portrait of a Decade: The Second American Revolution, about the civil rights movement. In 1991, Mr. Lewis published Make No Law, an account of The New York Times v. Sullivan, the 1964 Supreme Court decision that revolutionized American libel law. In Sullivan, the court held that public officials suing critics of their official conduct needed to prove that the contested statement(s) were made with "actual malice", that is, with knowledge that it was false or with "reckless disregard" of whether it was true or not.

The Times moved Lewis to London in 1964, where he was bureau chief with responsibility for broad coverage of politics, culture and, in the words of one editor, "ballet, music, Glyndebourne, la-di-da London society, diplomacy, the British character, you name it". He moved to New York in 1969 and began writing a twice-weekly opinion column for the Times. He continued to write these pieces, which appeared under the heading "At Home Abroad" or "Abroad at Home" depending on his byline, until retiring in 2001. Though wide-ranging in his interests, he often focused on legal questions, advocacy of compromise between Israel and the Palestinians, and criticism of the war in Vietnam and the apartheid regime in South Africa. On December 15, 2001, his final column warned that civil liberties were at risk in the U.S. reaction to the September 11 attacks.

Reflecting on his years as a columnist, he said he had learned two lessons:

One is that certainty is the enemy of decency and humanity in people who are sure they are right, like Osama bin Laden and (then-Attorney General) John Ashcroft. And secondly that for this country at least, given the kind of obstreperous, populous, diverse country we are, law is the absolute essential. And when governments short-cut the law, it's extremely dangerous.

When told Henry Kissinger had once described him as "always wrong", Lewis replied: "Probably because I wrote in a very uncomplimentary way about him. I didn’t like him. He did things that were very damaging to human beings."

== Other activities ==
Beginning in the mid-1970s, Lewis taught a course in First Amendment and the Supreme Court at Columbia University's Graduate School of Journalism for 23 years. He held the school's James Madison chair in First Amendment Issues from 1982. He lectured at Harvard from 1974 to 1989 and was a visiting lecturer at several other colleges and universities, including the universities of Arizona, California, Illinois, and Oregon.

In 1983, Lewis received the Elijah Parish Lovejoy Award as well as an honorary Doctor of Laws degree from Colby College. That year, he also served as the Wayne Morse Chair of Law and Politics, established in honor of the late former Senator, at the University of Oregon.

On January 8, 2001, he received the Presidential Citizens Medal from President Bill Clinton. On October 21, 2008, the National Coalition Against Censorship honored him for his work in the area of First Amendment rights and free expression.

He served for decades as a member of the Harvard Crimson's graduate board and as one of its trustees. He was a key player in the fundraising and reconstruction of the paper's Plympton Street building.

Lewis was elected to the American Philosophical Society in 2005.

He served on the board of directors of the Committee to Protect Journalists (CPJ) and its policy committee. CPJ awarded him its Burton Benjamin Award for lifetime achievement in 2009.

He was chosen Class Day speaker at Harvard in 1997.

He was a member of the Whitney R. Harris World Law Institute's International Council.

== Views on the press ==
Lewis read the First Amendment as a restriction on the ability of the federal government to regulate speech, but opposed attempts to broaden its meaning to create special protection for journalists. He approved when a federal court in 2005 jailed Judith Miller, a New York Times reporter, for refusing to name her confidential sources as a special prosecutor demanded she do. Max Frankel, another Times editor said: "In his later years he turned a little bit against the press, which he loved. But he disagreed with those of us who felt that we couldn't just trust the courts to defend our freedom".

Lewis also opposed journalists' advocacy of a federal "shield law" to allow journalists to refuse to reveal their sources. He cited the case of Wen Ho Lee, whose privacy was, in Lewis' view, violated by newspapers who published leaked information and then refused to identify the sources of those leaks, preferring to agree to a financial settlement. He noted that the newspapers said they were acting to "protect our journalists from further sanctions", thus privileging their own needs over the damage caused the victim of the false information they printed.

== Personal life ==
On July 8, 1951, Lewis married Linda J. Rannells, "a tall, blithe student of modern dance" according to Gay Talese. They had three children and divorced in 1982.

Lewis relocated from New York to Cambridge while he was a New York Times columnist. There, in 1984, he married Margaret H. Marshall, an attorney in private practice who later became General Counsel at Harvard University and Chief Justice of the Supreme Judicial Court of Massachusetts. They were both longtime residents of Cambridge, Massachusetts.

Lewis' sister, Nancy, was married to The Today Show film critic Gene Shalit from 1950 until her death from cancer in 1978. Through this marriage, he is the uncle of Willa Shalit, an entrepreneur, and Peter Shalit, who is an internal medicine physician and the author of Living Well: The Gay Man's Essential Health Guide.

Lewis died on March 25, 2013, from renal and heart failure, two days shy of his 86th birthday. He had been diagnosed with Parkinson's disease a few years earlier.

== Awards ==
- 1955: Pulitzer Prize for National Reporting
- 1963: Pulitzer Prize for National Reporting
- 1983: Elijah Parish Lovejoy Award
- 1983: Doctor of Laws degree from Colby College
- 2001: Presidential Citizens Medal by Bill Clinton
- 2003: American Civil Liberties Union's Roger N. Baldwin Medal of Liberty
- 2008: National Coalition Against Censorship honor for work on First Amendment rights and free expression

== Selected writings ==
Author

- Gideon's Trumpet (Random House, 1964) (Reprint ISBN 0-679-72312-9)
- Portrait of a Decade: The Second American Revolution (Random House, 1964) (ISBN 0-394-44412-4)
- Make No Law: The Sullivan Case and the First Amendment (Random House, 1991) (ISBN 0-394-58774-X)
- The Supreme Court and How It Works: The Story of the Gideon Case (Random House Children's Books, 1966) (ISBN 0-394-91861-4)
- Freedom for the Thought That We Hate: A Biography of the First Amendment (Basic Books, 2010) (ISBN 0465039170)

Co-author

- Pierce O'Donnell and Anthony Lewis, In Time of War: Hitler's Terrorist Attack on America (New Press, 2005) (ISBN 1-56584-958-2)
- Frank Snepp and Anthony Lewis, Irreparable Harm: A Firsthand Account of How One Agent Took on the CIA in an Epic Battle Over Free Speech (University Press of Kansas, 2001) (ISBN 0-7006-1091-X)

Editor

- Written into History: Pulitzer Prize Reporting of the Twentieth Century from The New York Times (Holt, 2001) (ISBN 0-8050-6849-X)

Preface/introduction

- Glory and Terror: The Growing Nuclear Danger by Steven Weinberg; preface by Anthony Lewis (New York Review Books, 2004) (ISBN 1-59017-130-6)
- The Other Israel: Voices of Refusal and Dissent edited by Tom Segev and Roane Carey, with an introduction by Anthony Lewis (New Press, 2004) (ISBN 1-56584-914-0)
- The Torture Papers: The Road to Abu Ghraib edited by Karen J. Greenberg and Joshua L. Dratel, with an introduction by Anthony Lewis (Cambridge University Press, 2005) (ISBN 0-521-85324-9)
- The Myth of the Imperial Judiciary: Why the Right Is Wrong About the Courts by Mark Kozlowski, foreword by Anthony Lewis (New York University Press, 2003) (ISBN 0-8147-4775-2)

Miscellaneous articles

- One Liberty at a Time (Mother Jones, May/June 2004)
- the Framers, the 1st Amendment and watchdog reporting
- "Heroic" News media?
- The Justices Take on the President
