= Margaret H. Marshall =

American judge (born 1944)

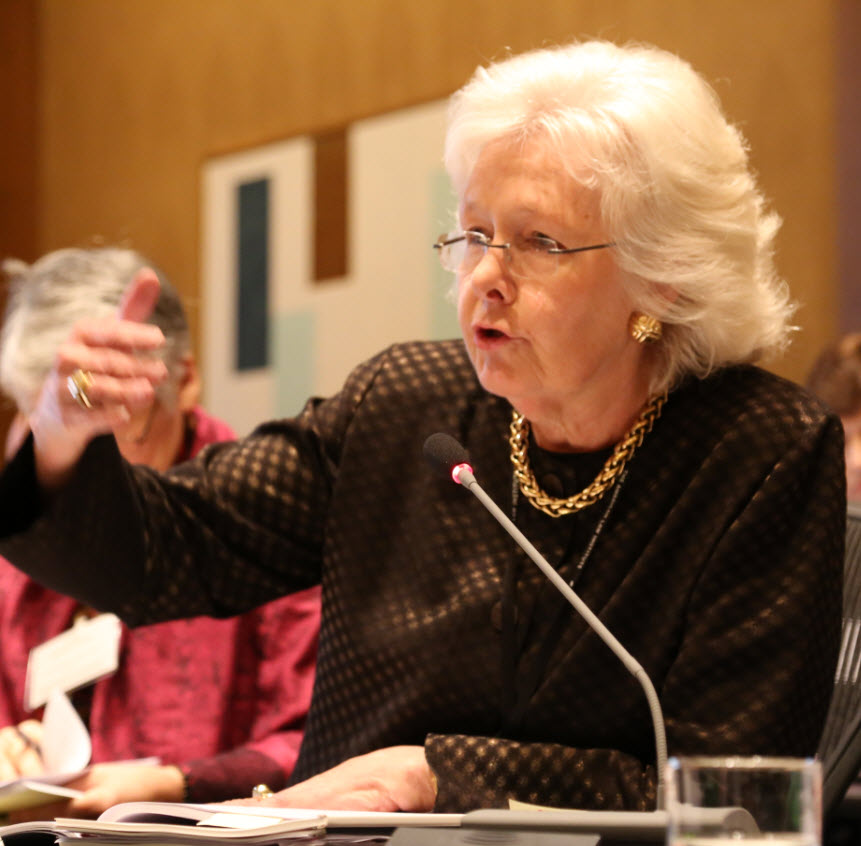
- Marshall in 2014

Chief Justice of the Massachusetts Supreme Judicial Court
- In office October 14, 1999 – December 19, 2010
- Appointed by: Paul Cellucci
- Preceded by: Herbert Wilkins
- Succeeded by: Roderick Ireland

Associate Justice of the Massachusetts Supreme Judicial Court
- In office October 31, 1996 – October 14, 1999
- Appointed by: William Weld
- Preceded by: Herbert Wilkins
- Succeeded by: Judith Cowin

Personal details
- Born: Margaret Hilary Marshall; September 1, 1944 (age 82) Newcastle, South Africa
- Spouse: Anthony Lewis (m. 1984; died 2013)
- Relatives: Gene Shalit (brother-in-law); Willa Shalit (niece-in-law)
- Education: University of the Witwatersrand; Harvard University (MA); Yale University (JD)

Margaret Hilary Marshall (born September 1, 1944) is an American jurist who served as the 24th chief justice of the Massachusetts Supreme Judicial Court, the first woman to hold the position. She was chief justice from 1999 to 2010. On July 21, 2010, she announced her retirement. She was a senior fellow of the Yale Corporation until she retired from the board in 2016, senior counsel at Choate Hall & Stewart, and a member of the Council of the American Law Institute. Marshall was elected in 2017 to the American Philosophical Society.

== Early life and education ==
Marshall was born in Newcastle, South Africa, and raised Anglican.

She was educated at the University of the Witwatersrand where she was active in student and anti-apartheid politics. In 1967 she was president of the National Union of South African Students (NUSAS), which was dedicated to ending oppressive minority rule and achieving equality for all South Africans. According to Marshall, "There was no access to justice in South Africa...There were a few courageous barristers who agreed to represent people charged with political crimes, but, by and large, if you were a black South African, you had no justice. The death penalty was imposed in vastly disproportionate numbers. Many of the offenses were applicable to black South Africans only." In June 1966, as a NUSAS vice president, she welcomed U.S. Senator Robert F. Kennedy to South Africa, in place of union president Ian Robertson, who had been banned from political appearances.

Marshall emigrated to the United States to escape political persecution. In Johannesburg, she attended Kingsmead College, and in Delaware she graduated from the Tatnall School. She earned a master's degree in education from Harvard University in 1969, and a J.D. degree from Yale Law School in 1976. She acquired United States citizenship in 1978.

In 1984, she married then-New York Times columnist Anthony Lewis, to whom she remained married until his death in 2013.

== Legal career ==
From 1976 to 1989, she was an associate and a partner in private practice at the Boston law firm of Csaplar & Bok. From 1989 to 1992, she was a partner in the Boston law firm of Choate, Hall & Stewart. From 1991 to 1992, she was president of the Boston Bar Association, the oldest bar association in the United States. From 1992 to 1996, she was general counsel to Harvard University.

Marshall was appointed to be an associate justice of the Massachusetts Supreme Judicial Court in 1996 by Republican governor William F. Weld. She was named as chief justice in September 1999 by Republican governor Paul Cellucci, to begin her term on October 14, 1999. She is the second woman to serve on the Supreme Judicial Court, the oldest appellate court in the Western Hemisphere, and the first to serve as chief justice in its more than 300-year history.

In the course of her term, she wrote more than 200 opinions. Marshall wrote the ground-breaking decision in Goodridge v. Department of Public Health that declared that the Massachusetts constitution does not permit the state to deny citizens the right to same-sex marriage.

On July 21, 2010, Marshall announced her decision to retire from the court, effective at the end of October. She said her decision was prompted by a desire to spend more time with her husband Anthony Lewis, who was suffering from Parkinson's disease. After stepping down from the bench, she rejoined Choate, Hall & Stewart.

Marshall served as the senior fellow of the Yale Corporation, the governing body of Yale University. until 2016. She is the first woman to hold the position, and previously served a term as a corporation fellow from 2004 to 2010.

Marshall is the 2021 recipient of the Bolch Prize for the Rule of Law awarded by the Bolch Judicial Institute at Duke Law School. On May 27, 2021, she was awarded an honorary Doctorate of Laws from Harvard University. In May 2022, she was awarded an honorary Doctor of Laws degree from the University of Pennsylvania.

== See also ==
- List of female state supreme court justices

Legal offices
Preceded by Herbert Wilkins	Associate Justice of the Massachusetts Supreme Judicial Court; 1996–1999	Succeeded by Francis X. Spina
Preceded by Herbert Wilkins	Chief Justice of the Massachusetts Supreme Judicial Court; 1999–2010	Succeeded by Roderick Ireland
