= New Orleans (musical) =

New Orleans: the Storyville Musical is a musical by Toni Morrison, Donald McKayle and Dorothea Freitag, set in 1917 in New Orleans' Storyville district. Produced in workshop in 1982, it also received staged readings at New York Shakespeare Festival in 1984 but was never fully produced. It was Morrison's first venture in the medium of theatre.

Numerous working titles and variations have been used in press coverage of the piece, including Storyville, District Storyville, New Orleans, N'Orleans: the Storyville Musical and New Orleans: the Storyville Musical.

== Development ==
Choreographer and director Donald McKayle first explored the story of New Orleans' Storyville when he collaborated with composer Dorothea Freitag in 1962, with the influential piece District Storyville, a ballet inspired by the early life of Louis Armstrong in a New Orleans brothel. It tells the story of a madam, the brothel prostitutes, a jazz horn player and "Little Lou", a child who dreams of being a musician as well.

McKayle returned to similar subject matter and the origins of jazz music with the 1975 musical Doctor Jazz. McKayle directed and choreographed the Buster Davis musical, a production fraught with troubles that included a difficult relationship with producer Cyma Rubin. The New York Times called the show "disastrous" and McKayle described it as "an endless series of mishaps."

In 1981, shortly after the opening of McKayle's Sophisticated Ladies, a revue based on the music of Duke Ellington, a young producer named Kevin Gebhard approached McKayle. Gebhard had seen the 1980 production of District Storyville at Alvin Ailey American Dance Theater. He saw the potential of adapting the piece into a full musical and McKayle agreed.

McKayle approached Alice Childress to collaborate on the Storyville musical. Although she showed interest, she did not commit to the project. Gebhard then suggested novelist Toni Morrison. After a promising first meeting, they began to collaborate. "She seemed eager to work on the project," recalled McKayle in his memoir.

Morrison wanted to try writing lyrics as well. Paired with Dorothea Freitag, composer of the 1962 ballet, Morrison wrote lyrics to new songs. The musical also incorporated existing music such as that of Jelly Roll Morton and Sidney Bechet. McKayle contributed some input to the songs, and suggested selections of antebellum music that could inform the content.

== 1982 workshop ==
In 1981, Storyville was announced as a new Broadway musical, featuring the playwriting debut of Toni Morrison. It was planned to open on Broadway in fall 1982, with Donald McKayle as director and choreographer and Geoffrey Holder as costume designer. It was producer Kevin Gebhard's first credit.

In February 1982, Paramount Theater Productions, a division of Paramount Pictures, announced its backing of several theater ventures, including District Storyville.

That July, New Orleans went into a six-week workshop production, with a cast that included Carmen de Lavallade, Lynne Thigpen and folksinger Odetta. "I thought working with other people would be very difficult for me, but something magical has happened," Morrison told The New York Times. "I had no idea how infectious this would be."

By September, the workshop run had concluded. Producer Kevin Gebhard announced that New Orleans would not be moving to Broadway after all, and that Paramount had exited as a backer. Instead, a further workshop would refine the work, funded by an anonymous financial backer.

Variety reported in March 1983 that producer Kevin Gebhard disagreed with Morrison and McKayle on the direction future rewrites would take, and exited the project. The authors were then seeking new management to continue development. The cost of the 1982 workshop process was $150,000.

== 1984 reading ==
In August 1984, Joseph Papp produced staged readings of New Orleans at the Public Theater. The production was credited as "By Toni Morrison, with Donald McKayle, music by Sidney Bechet and Jelly Roll Morton, additional music and musical direction by Dorothea Freitag, lyrics by Toni Morrison." The production was directed by Ron Himes

=== Cast and Crew ===
- Omar - Ed Love
- Johnny - Larry Riley
- Cally - Lynne Thigpen
- Beau - Tico Wells
- Ana La Premier - Sandra Reaves-Phillips
- Sweet Justice - Antonio Fargas
- Geneva - Ann Duquesnay
- Faye - S. Epatha Merkerson
- Elise - Charlaine Woodward
- Jessica Five - Elaine Beener
- Beau's friends - Ed Love, Chauncey Roberts, Dan Strayhorn
- Knockout - Charlaine Woodward
- Gloria Moon (AKA Mouth) - Ann Duquesnay
- Lurleen Price (AKA Copperbottom) - S. Epatha Merkerson
- Rochelle La Fort (AKA Rat) - Terry Burrell
- Patricia Diamond (AKA Bad Blood) - Carol Lynn Maillard
- Adella Westwood (AKA Dollar Bill) - Elaine Beener
- Vesuvius - Nora Cole
- Cobalt Blue - Odetta
- Clarence Deal - Ken Brawner
- Trick Baby 1 - Pam Portillo
- Trick Baby 2 - Victoria Platt
- Cally's Friends - Terry Burrell, Nora Cole, Carol Maillard
- Percussionist - Leopoldo Fleming
- Stage Directions - Toni Morrison
- Stage Manager - Elizabeth Holloway

== Legacy ==
In his memoir, Donald McKayle described the show as ultimately unsuccessful: "Some of the songs that emerged were wonderful and the language exquisite, but the play did not hang together." Morrison's stage directions, which she read aloud to audiences at both the 1982 workshop production and the 1984 staged readings, were "inseparable" to the piece. Without these sections being read, the audience could not access them, and at the same time they could not hold audience attention.

In 1986, nearing the premiere of her play Dreaming Emmett, Toni Morrison noted to a reporter from UPI that she did not consider herself a playwright, and also that she intentionally did not list New Orleans among her credits because she did not originate the concept. "I wrote the play like an assignment."

A decade later, theatre artist Mark Green, who had attended both workshop and reading of New Orleans, encouraged McKayle to continue to develop the premise as a musical. With original composer Dorothea Freitag deceased, McKayle began to work with lyricist Pamela Phillips-Oland and composer Steven Bramson on a production that became Shimmy. The show received a staged reading in 1994, but was never produced.
