= New York State Writers Institute =

Literary organization

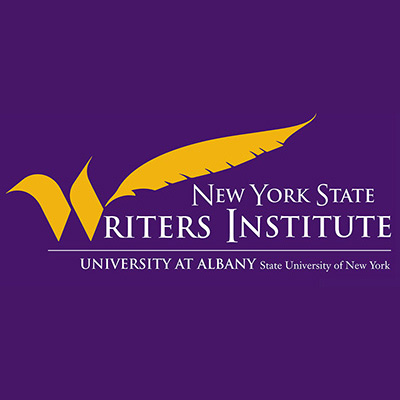
NYS Writers Institute logo

The New York State Writers Institute is a literary organization based at the University at Albany in Albany, New York. It sponsors the Albany Book Festival, the Albany Film Festival, Visiting Writers Series, Classic Film Series, the Trolley online literary magazine, and the New York State Summer Writers Institute, and New York State Summer Young Writers Institute in collaboration with Skidmore College.

The NYS Writers Institute was selected by the New York State Legislature in 1985 to award the New York State Author [Edith Wharton Citation of Merit for Fiction Writers] and New York State Poet [Walt Whitman Citation of Merit for Poets] every two years.

== History ==
1980s

Pulitzer Prize-winning novelist William Kennedy founded the NYS Writers Institute in 1983 with part of a fellowship awarded him from the John D. and Catherine T. MacArthur Foundation. As part of that award, $15,000 for five years went to the institution of Kennedy's choice, the University at Albany, State University of New York. The university made a commitment to match those funds in order to establish a visiting writers series.

In 1984, the institute had its first visiting writer event with Nobel Prize-winning novelist Saul Bellow. Later that year, NY Governor Mario Cuomo signed into law the legislation creating the New York State Writers Institute, giving it goals to conduct a broad range of cultural and educational literary activities. The Writers Institute has a mandate to provide "a milieu for established and aspiring writers to work together to increase the freedom of the artistic imagination,"and "to encourage the development of writing skills at all levels of education throughout the state." A year later, the institute commissioned a play by author Toni Morrison, then in residence at University at Albany. Dreaming Emmett was co-produced by the Writer's Institute and Capital Repertory Theatre in 1986.

1990s

In 1991 the NYS Writers Institute hosted Telling the Truth: A Symposium on the Craft of Nonfiction. This symposium assembled 37 of the "country's most noted nonfiction writers" for a three-day series of presentations and panel discussions. Among the speakers were Maureen Dowd, James Fallows, Timothy Ferris, Frances FitzGerald, Doris Kearns Goodwin, Mary Gordon, Stephen Jay Gould, Patricia Limerick, J. Anthony Lukas, Norman Mailer, David McCullough, Richard Rhodes, Gay Talese, Calvin Trillin, Juan Williams and Garry Wills.

2000s

On November 13, 2000, the institute hosted A New York State of Mind, a panel featuring Russell Banks, Mary Gordon, William Kennedy, and Meg Wolitzer. The writers discussed how they used the history, landscape, and popular culture of New York as their muse for fiction writing. It was cosponsored by the New York Council for the Humanities.

The institute celebrated its 25th anniversary in 2009 with a special event featuring former governor Mario Cuomo.

2010s

The institute began to expand its events to include theatre. In conjunction with the American Place Theatre, the institute presented in 2011 a one-person theatrical adaptation of Junot Díaz's Pulitzer Prize-winning novel, The Brief Wondrous Life of Oscar Wao.

The inaugural event of The Creative Life: A Conversation Series at UAlbany began in 2016 by featuring Pulitzer Prize-winning author Joyce Carol Oates. The "Speaker Series" also saw several iconic visiting speakers, including Bill Nye in 2015, Supreme Court Justice Sonia Sotomayor in 2017, and Olympic gold-medalist Aly Raisman.

In 2017, the Institute hosted a two-day symposium examining the meaning of truth and modern journalism called "Telling the Truth in a Post-Truth World". The symposium was moderated by Bob Schieffer.

2020s

The Institute celebrated its 40th anniversary with an event at the University at Albany on Thursday, January 19, 2023.

The Institute received a $1 million donation from the Chet and Karen Opalka Foundation in January, 2023.

== Speaker Series ==
The NYS Writers Institute co-sponsors the University at Albany's Speaker Series, which began in 2009. The events features nationally recognized icons, who deliver speeches and engage in Q&A's at UAlbany's campus. Other sponsors of the series include UAlbany Student Association, Division of Student Affairs, University Auxiliary Services and the Alumni Association. Most events are free for students and open to the public.

Past speakers include:

2019 Dan Rather – broadcast journalist and author Terry Crews – actor, athlete, activist

2018 Aly Raisman – Olympic medal gymnast and author Tyler Oakley – pop culture phenomenon

2017 Captain Scott Kelly – engineer, U.S. navy captain & retired astronaut Octavia Spencer – Academy Award-winning actress Sonia Sotomayor – U.S. Supreme Court Justice

2016 Brandon Stanton – photographer and creator of Humans of New York Daymond John – celebrity entrepreneur, FUBU founder, 'Shark Tank' investor Venus Williams – tennis legend

2015 Bill Nye the Science Guy Common – king of conscious hip hop

2013 David Axelrod, David Plouffe & Jon Favreau – Obama campaign advisors

2011 President Bill Clinton – 42nd president of the United States Magic Johnson – basketball legend, entrepreneur & philanthropist

2010 Barbara Walters – broadcast journalist, author, television personality Howard Dean & Karl Rove – political icons

2009 General Colin Powell – former U.S. Secretary of State
