= Willa Shalit =

American artist (born 1955)

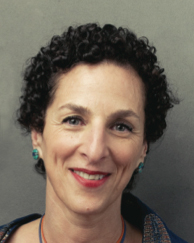
- Shalit in 2012
- Born: November 11, 1955 (age 70); New York City, New York, U.S.
- Occupation: Entrepreneur
- Spouse(s): Michael Schneider (divorced); Anthony James Heynen
- Children: 1
- Parent(s): Gene Shalit; Nancy Lewis
- Relatives: Anthony Lewis (uncle); Margaret H. Marshall (stepaunt)
- Website: www.rtmltd.com

Willa Shalit (born November 11, 1955) is an American entrepreneur and strategic advisor. She is widely recognized for her work as an artist, theatre and television producer, photographer and author/editor.

== Early life ==
Shalit was born in 1955 in New York City to film and book critic Gene Shalit and Nancy Shalit (née Lewis); her parents were of Russian Jewish and Latvian Jewish descent. Her name comes from the American author Willa Cather. She was born the second of six children, and raised in Leonia, New Jersey. Her father shielded the family from the public eye. Her brother Peter Shalit is an internal medicine physician and the author of Living Well: The Gay Man's Essential Health Guide. Her uncle was Pulitzer Prize–winning journalist Anthony Lewis; her stepaunt, Lewis's widow, is retired Massachusetts Chief Justice Margaret H. Marshall, who wrote the decision in Goodridge v. Department of Public Health resulting in the world's first ruling in a court of final appeal legalizing same sex marriage.

When Shalit was 15, she was raped at knifepoint. She said of the experience, "I learned that life can change in the blink of an eye and that security is very illusory. I also realized there are some experiences that require a lifetime to recover from." She explained that the experience was deeply constructive, if cruel, training for finding common ground with the women of Rwanda.

She graduated from Saint Ann's School (Brooklyn) in 1974. In 1978, she graduated from Oberlin College with a degree in classics. After graduating, she moved to Martha's Vineyard and partnered with artist Richard Lee to create masks.

== Career ==
=== Artist ===
Throughout the 1980s, Shalit created "lifecast" sculptures made from molds formed directly upon human faces and bodies. Her casts of five former United States presidents are in the collections of their respective presidential libraries. Other examples of her work are on display at the United States Olympic Committee's training center in Colorado Springs, Colorado, the Fogelson Library at the College of Santa Fe (now Santa Fe University of Art and Design), and the Jewish Guild for the Blind in New York City. She also created life casts for Muhammad Ali, Bill Gates, Clint Eastwood, Sting, civil rights leader Rosa Parks, choreographer Alvin Ailey, Isaac Stern, sculptor Louise Nevelson, prima ballerina Natalia Makarova and the 14th Dalai Lama.

In 1986, Shalit collaborated with Nobel Prize-winning author Toni Morrison and Gilbert Moses to design masks and costumes for Morrison's play Dreaming Emmett, directed by Moses.

In 1994, Shalit and her lifecasting art were featured in the Emmy Award-winning television documentary, Willa: Behind The Mask.

She was artist-in-residence at the College of Santa Fe from 1989 to 1994.

In 1998, Shalit's exhibit "Incarcerated Women: A View From the Inside Out" was featured at the National Museum for Women in the Arts in Washington, DC. The installation displayed life-cast facial portraits of inmates from the Bexar County Adult Detention Center in San Antonio, Texas.

=== Producer ===
In 1985, Shalit produced James Lecesne's play One Man Band off-Broadway.

Shalit was the producer of the first anti-violence benefit performance of Eve Ensler's The Vagina Monologues with Whoopi Goldberg, Susan Sarandon, Winona Ryder, Calista Flockhart, Lily Tomlin and others. She also produced a 1997 reading of Eve Ensler's Necessary Targets at the Helen Hayes Theater Broadway starring Meryl Streep, Anjelica Huston, and Cherry Jones and the landmark V-Day 2001 performance in Madison Square Garden featuring Oprah Winfrey, Queen Latifah, Glenn Close, Claire Danes and many others. Shalit continued to produce the play in February 1998 in New York City, and during a second reading of the play at Kennedy Center for then First Lady Hillary Clinton starring Natalie Portman and Jena Malone. From 1999 to 2003 Shalit produced the play during the off-Broadway run at New York City's Westside Theater and later served as executive producer of the 2002 HBO film of the show. She was an executive producer of Until the Violence Stops, a documentary film about V-Day's 2002 activities.

She co-produced the 2002 off-Broadway run of Ensler's Necessary Targets, produced Carol Kaplan's play Jocasta Rising at the Artscape Theatre Centre in Cape Town, South Africa in 2004, and was an associate producer of the 2004 Broadway revival of August Wilson's Ma Rainey's Black Bottom starring Whoopi Goldberg.

=== Photographer ===
Shalit's photos of Afghanistan, Rwanda and Israel have been published in the Chicago Tribune, The New York Times, the International Herald Tribune, Parade magazine, Marie Claire magazine, O, The Oprah Magazine, and distributed by the Associated Press wire service.

=== Author and editor ===
Her 1992 book Lifecast: Behind the Mask (ISBN 0941831787) details her methods and experiences casting sculptures of the Dalai Lama and other notable persons. Proceeds from the book benefitted the Touch Foundation, which sponsors "Please Touch" exhibits of work for the blind and visually impaired.

In 2005, along with Yoko Ono, Shalit edited the HarperCollins book Memories of John Lennon; it features intimate glimpses from those who knew John, including Pete Townshend, Sir Elton John, and David Geffen, and artists who followed him such as Bono, Alicia Keys and Carlos Santana. The book also contains photographs from Annie Leibovitz.

Shalit edited Becoming Myself: Reflections on Growing Up Female, a collection of essays and reminiscences by notable women including Meryl Streep, Maya Angelou, and America Ferrera, that was published by Hyperion in April 2006.

=== Social entrepreneur ===
To bring economic advancement to women in post-trauma zones, Shalit has worked to create markets in the United States for products manufactured jointly by Palestinian and Israeli women, and by women survivors of the Rwandan genocide.

Shalit's company, Fair Winds Trading, became an importer of handmade goods from Rwanda and partnered with Macy's for the Rwanda Path to Peace project to market handwoven Rwandan baskets, including those made by Janet Nkubana's organization Gahaya Links, in the United States, and produced hand-beaded gemstone and glass bracelets in partnership with O, The Oprah Magazine. In 2015, Macy's and Rwanda Path to Peace celebrated a 10-year partnership.

In 2010, Fair Winds Trading launched the Heart of Haiti line working with Macy's and the Clinton Foundation and the Clinton Bush Haiti Fund. The line included handcrafted products made by Haitian artists and was part of an effort to help rebuild from the 2010 Haiti earthquake. Shalit organized a trip to Haiti where Macy's leaders, joined by Martha Stewart and Rachel Roy, met with local artisans. In 2010, Macy's was the biggest U.S. retailer selling handmade Haitian goods, followed by the West Elm and Anthropologie chains.

In 2011, Shalit co-founded the communications firm Road to Market, ltd where she develops global branding strategies and continues to work with social justice missions and worldwide movements.

Shalit also co-founded an online platform for women designers called Maiden Nation. The site features work designed by Rachel Roy, Lauren Bush, Yoko Ono, Gloria Steinem and Chan Luu.

When Shalit's friend Anne Glauber was diagnosed with pancreatic cancer in 2014, together they held an information-gathering meeting at the Roosevelt Hotel in New York, where they met with Dr. Allyson Ocean of New York-Presbyterian/Weill Cornell Medicine, Kerri Kaplan of the Lustgarten Foundation and others. The team developed Let’s Win - an online community for sharing new science-driven treatments to help patients and families fight pancreatic cancer. Shalit is the co-founder and digital director of Let’s Win.

Shalit serves as President of the Board for Indigenous Ways, an advocacy organization based in New Mexico. She also is a team member at 18by.vote, a non-partisan youth-led organization developed to support teenage voter registration and voting.

=== Philanthropist and activist ===
Shalit's Touch Foundation created an exhibit of touchable lifecasts of the faces of celebrities and other notable individuals, for the purpose of making those faces accessible to the blind and visually impaired, which toured American museums from 1990 to 2000, including the Philadelphia Museum of Art and the Memphis Brooks Museum of Art in Memphis, Tennessee.

Shalit was a member of the Board of Trustees at the College of Santa Fe from 1990 to 1995.

She co-founded V-Day with Ensler and served as its first executive director. V-day is a non-profit organization that distributes funds to grassroots, national, and international organizations and programs that work to stop violence against women and girls. During her time as executive director, Shalit traveled with Ensler on a "harrowing undercover journey" to chronicle the Revolutionary Association of the Women of Afghanistan's fight against the Taliban in 2002. More than 2,000 members of this clandestine network provide shelter, education and medical services to Afghan women and girls—all in defiance of the Taliban.

Shalit served as a special advisor to the United Nations Development Fund for Women (UNIFEM) and The United Nations Ethical Fashion Initiative. In 2007, Shalit joined the Board of Directors of the Hadassah Foundation. She currently serves on the Board of the Israeli Palestinian Peace organization, American Friends of the Parents Circle, (Parents Circle Family Forum) and on the Advisory Board of Feminist.com.

in 2014, Shalit was one of the first sponsors of Women and Men as Allies, an initiative founded by Feminist.com in partnership with The Center for the Study of Men and Masculinities at Stony Brook University.

== Awards ==
Women's eNews named Shalit one of "21 Leaders for the 21st Century" in 2006.The Holmes Report, a magazine for public relations professionals, gave a 2006 Superior Achievement in Branding and Reputation Award to Shalit's Rwanda Path to Peace project, which was also "highly commended" by the judges of the International Chamber of Commerce's 2006 World Business Awards in support of the United Nations Development Programme's Millennium Development Goals.
