= Gene Shalit =

American film critic (1926–2026)

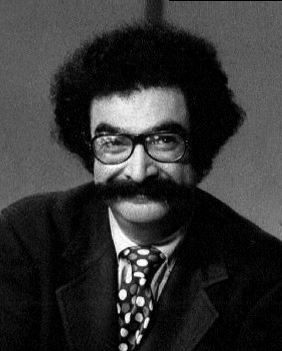
- Shalit in 1973
- Born: March 25, 1926; New York City, U.S.
- Died: June 12, 2026 (aged 100); Stockbridge, Massachusetts, U.S.
- Education: University of Illinois Urbana-Champaign (BA)
- Occupations: Journalist; film critic; literary critic; television personality; author
- Years active: 1960s–2010
- Television: Today
- Spouse: Nancy Lewis (m. 1950; died 1978)
- Children: 6, including Willa
- Relatives: Anthony Lewis (brother-in-law); Margaret H. Marshall (sister-in-law)

Eugene Shalit (March 25, 1926 – June 12, 2026) was an American journalist, television personality, film and book critic, and author. After starting to work part-time on NBC's The Today Show in 1970, he appeared regularly there from January 15, 1973, until his retirement on November 11, 2010. He was known for his frequent use of puns and his distinctive bushy mustache and Jewfro-styled hair.

== Early life, family and education ==
Shalit was born on March 25, 1926, in New York City, and raised in Newark and Morristown, New Jersey; he was of Latvian Jewish ancestry.

He attended Morristown High School, where he wrote a humor column The Korn Krib for the school newspaper. Shalit wrote for The Daily Illini at the University of Illinois Urbana-Champaign, graduating in 1949 with a Bachelor of Arts degree in science and letters.

== Career ==
Shalit, according to a Dick Clark interview in The New York Times Magazine, was Clark's press agent in the early 1960s. Shalit reportedly "stopped representing" Clark during a Congressional investigation of payola. Clark never spoke to Shalit again, and referred to him as a "jellyfish".

Shalit began reviewing the arts in 1967 and wrote for such publications as Look magazine, Ladies' Home Journal (for 12 years), Cosmopolitan, TV Guide, Seventeen, Glamour, McCall's, and The New York Times.

From 1970 to 1982, Shalit broadcast a daily essay, Man About Anything, for the NBC Radio Network, which was NBC's most widely carried radio feature.

From January 15, 1973, to November 11, 2010, Shalit served as the film and book critic for NBC's Today, marking a tenure of over 37 years during which he reviewed thousands of films and conducted interviews with prominent actors and directors. Shalit's generally positive assessments of films, often avoiding outright pans, drew both acclaim for accessibility and criticism from peers for lacking rigor, as evidenced by parodies from rival film critics like Siskel and Ebert. Among his notable reviews, Shalit praised John Cusack's performance in the 1989 film Say Anything..., describing the film as an "unpretentious and perceptive little jewel of a movie" that captured the nuances of young romance. He similarly lauded the 1987 Mel Brooks film Spaceballs in an interview with Brooks, highlighting its satirical take on science fiction tropes while noting its modest $20 million budget.

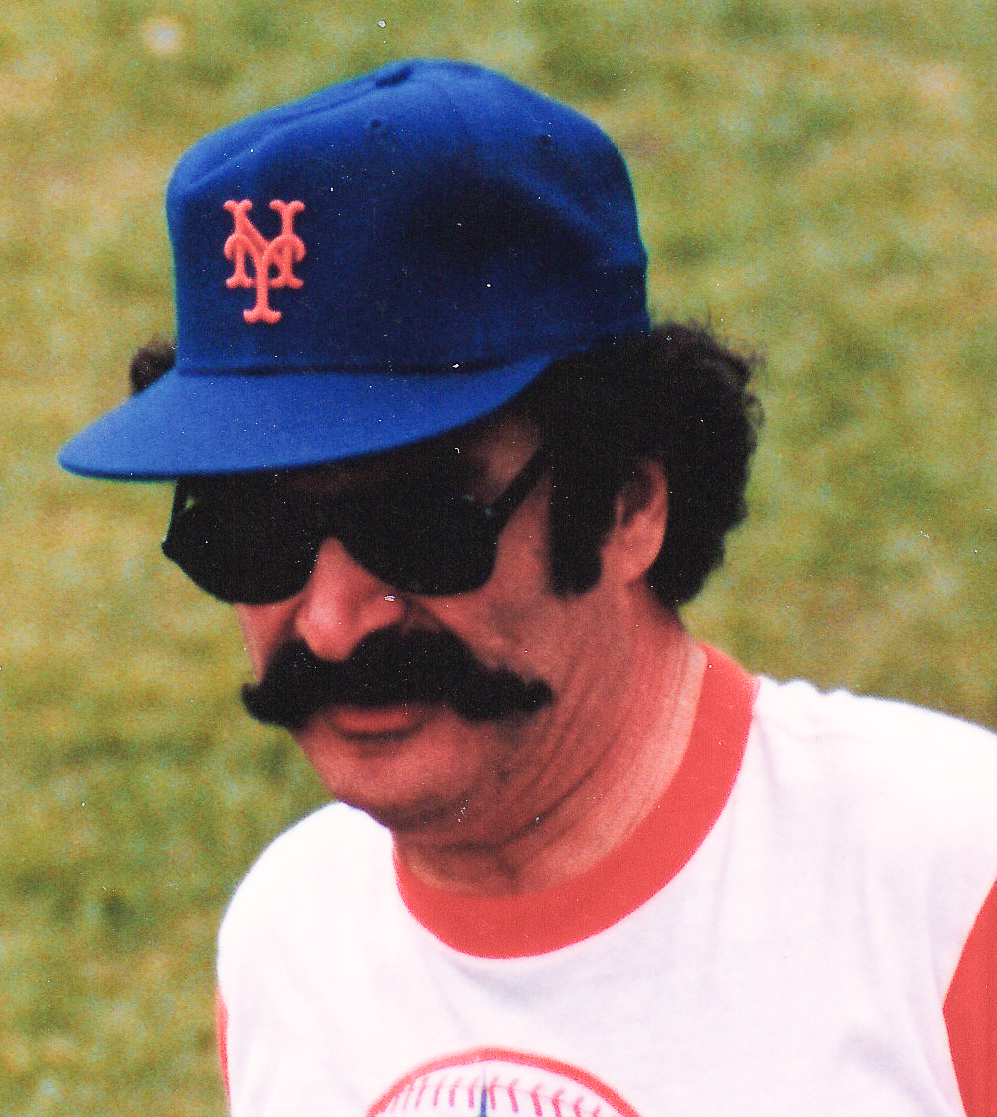
Shalit in 1986

In 1986, Shalit hosted a videocassette and laserdisc collection from MCA Home Video, Gene Shalit's Critic's Choice Video. Four images (five on the laserdisc covers) of Shalit appeared in a filmstrip on the front of the box with his reviews on the back. Titles included Touch of Evil, Destry Rides Again, Double Indemnity, and The Ipcress File.

Shalit announced that he would leave The Today Show after 40 years, effective November 11, 2010. He was quoted as saying "It's enough already", about his retirement. At the time of his departure, he was one of the last high profile film critics on a major network. He largely stayed out of the public eye thereafter, only appearing once for Willard Scott's retirement from NBC on December 15, 2015.

At the time of his death, Shalit was writing a memoir entitled Procrastination is a Full Time Job.

Brokeback Mountain review controversy

In 2005, Shalit gave an adverse review to the film Brokeback Mountain, in which he described Jack Twist (the character played by Jake Gyllenhaal) as a "sexual predator" who "tracks Ennis (Heath Ledger's character) down and coaxes him into sporadic trysts".

The Gay and Lesbian Alliance Against Defamation (GLAAD) stated that Shalit's "baseless branding of Jack as a 'sexual predator' merely because he was romantically interested in someone of the same sex is defamatory, ignorant, and irresponsible" and that he "used the occasion to promote defamatory antigay prejudice to a national audience". Shalit's son Peter, who is gay, wrote a letter to GLAAD defending his father and stating he had not defamed anyone and was not homophobic, and further said the organization had defamed him by "falsely accusing him of a repellent form of bigotry". Shalit himself apologized for the wording of his review.

== Personal life ==
Shalit was married to Nancy Lewis, who is the sister of journalist Anthony Lewis, from 1950 until her death from cancer in 1978. For much of his career, he lived in Leonia, New Jersey. He also resided in Stockbridge, Massachusetts. Shalit and Lewis had six children. They include the artist and businesswoman Willa Shalit (born 1955), Peter (born 1954), who is a physician, and Emily, who was born in August 1957 and died of ovarian cancer in November 2012, at the age of 55.

=== Later years and death ===
On October 24, 2012, Shalit crashed his car in Lenox, Massachusetts, after falling asleep at the wheel. Misdemeanor charges of negligent driving to endanger were later dismissed after he agreed to stop driving until the dismissal, and he was to follow a "safety condition" approved by his attorney and the police chief.

Shalit turned 100 on March 25, 2026. The Today Show did a special segment commemorating the milestone in which Al Roker sent birthday wishes through a personalized Smucker's jar. Shalit celebrated the occasion surrounded by his family, and was looking forward to watching his favorite baseball team, the New York Mets as they geared up for opening day.

Shalit died on June 12, 2026, in Stockbridge, Massachusetts, at the age of 100.

== In popular culture ==
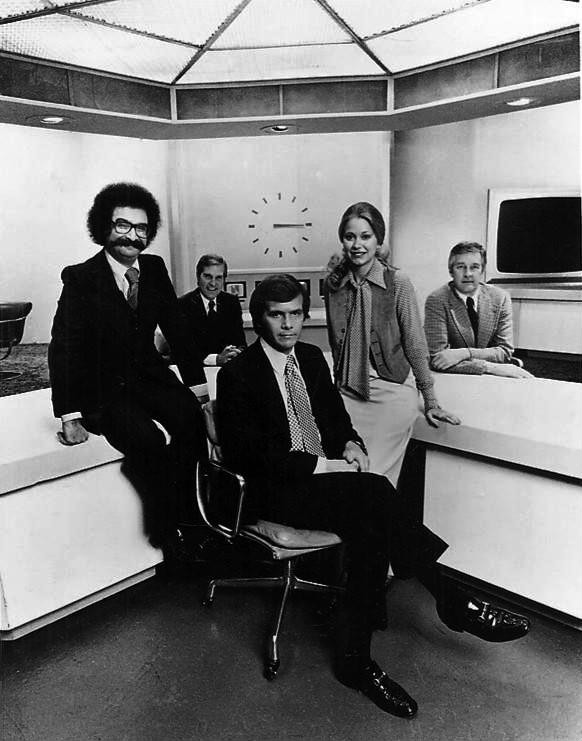
Shalit (left) with Today show anchors, 1976

- Shalit guest-starred as the voice, and was portrayed in the form of a fish food critic named "Gene Scallop" in the SpongeBob SquarePants episode "The Krusty Sponge".
- Shalit was parodied in several episodes of Family Guy in cutaway gags, including "Family Guy Viewer Mail #1", "Brian Sings and Swings", "The Book of Joe", and "Tiegs for Two".
- Shalit also voiced a portrayal of himself in three episodes of the animated series The Critic.
- A Muppet character based on him appeared in The Muppet Show: Sex and Violence (1975).
- Shalit was portrayed in two episodes of Saturday Night Live by Jon Lovitz, and later in nine episodes by Horatio Sanz in sketches and Weekend Update sequences.
- Shalit was also portrayed on Second City Television several times by cast member Eugene Levy.
- On Late Night with David Letterman, Shalit had his head squashed between two giant comedy hammers during an interview with David Letterman.

== Written works ==
- Shalit, Gene (1965). Somehow It Works; A Candid Portrait of the 1964 Presidential Election.
- Shalit, Gene (1987). Laughing Matters: A Celebration of American Humor. Doubleday. ISBN 978-0385185479.
- Shalit, Gene (2002). Great Hollywood Wit. Macmillan. ISBN 978-0312282721.
- Shalit, Gene (2016) [1962]. Khrushchev's Top Secret Coloring Book. About Comics. ISBN 978-1936404636.

== See also ==
- List of centenarians (actors, filmmakers and entertainers)
