= Faiza Jama Mohamed =

Women's rights activist

Faiza Jama Mohamed (born 1958) is a Somalian women's rights activist, Africa Regional Director of Equality Now. She has been a prominent campaigner for the Maputo Protocol, and against female genital mutilation.

== Life ==
Faiza Jama Mohamed holds a Masters in Business Administration from the California State University, Fresno. In 1998, she also gained a human rights diploma from the Institute of Social Studies (ISS) at The Hague.

In 2004, Faiza Jama Mohamed wrote Pambazuka News editorials arguing for the importance of the African Protocol on the Rights of Women. She has also written for The Guardian.

== Works ==
- 'African Union Protocol on the Rights of Women in Africa: the SOAWR Campaign', in Roselynn Musa, Faiza Jama Mohammed and Firoze Manji (eds.) Breathing life into the African Union protocol on women's rights in Africa, pp.14–18.
- (ed. with Brenda Kombo and Rainatou Sow) Journey to Equality: 10 Years of the Protocol on the Rights of Women in Africa , Equality Now, 2013.
