= List of Suffolk University people =

Here follows a list of notable people associated with Suffolk University in Boston, Massachusetts. This list includes Suffolk alumni, faculty, and honorary degree recipients, as well as students of Suffolk University Law School, the Suffolk College of Arts and Sciences, Sawyer Business School, and the New England School of Art and Design at Suffolk University.

== Politics ==
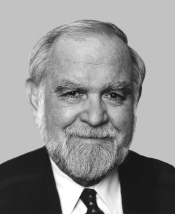
Joe Moakley, Class of 1956, former U.S. congressman

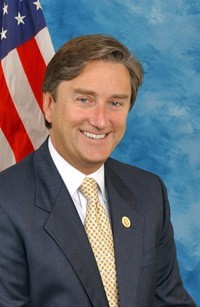
John F. Tierney, Class of 1977, former U.S. congressman

- Edward M. Augustus Jr., class of 1987, city manager of Worcester, Massachusetts (2014–present)
- James V. Aukerman, class of 1975, former Rhode Island representative, attorney, candidate for Rhode Island's 2nd congressional district seat in 1982
- Phillip Brutus, class of 1985, former Florida representative; attorney; seeking Florida's 17th congressional district seat
- James A. Burke, U.S. representative from Massachusetts (1959–1979)
- David Campbell, New Hampshire state representative
- David Caprio, class of 1992, legislator, Rhode Island state representative (1999–2011)
- Frank T. Caprio, class of 1991, general treasurer of Rhode Island (2006–2011)
- Gary Christenson, class of 1990, 1992, and 2003, mayor of Malden, Massachusetts (2012–present)
- Edward J. Clancy, Jr., former member of the Massachusetts House of Representatives, Massachusetts State Senate and former mayor of Lynn, Massachusetts
- Michael A. Costello, class of 1996, member of the Massachusetts House of Representatives from Essex's 1st district (2002–2014)
- Armand Paul D'Amato, class of 1969, former member of the New York State Assembly from New York's 19th district (1973–1987)
- Robert A. DeLeo, speaker of the Massachusetts House of Representatives from Suffolk's 19th district (1991–present)
- Salvatore DiMasi, class of 1971, former speaker of the Massachusetts House of Representatives (1979 - 2009)
- James H. Fagan, class of 1973, member of the Massachusetts House of Representatives from Bristol's 3rd district (1993–2011)
- Christopher Fallon, class of 1981, member of the Massachusetts House of Representatives from Middlesex's 33rd district (1993–2015)
- Linda Dorcena Forry, class of 2004, member of the Massachusetts House of Representatives from Suffolk's 12th district (2005–2013), member of the Massachusetts Senate from Suffolk's 1st district (2013–present)
- Allan Fung, class of 1995, mayor of Cranston, Rhode Island (2009-present)
- William F. Galvin, class of 1975, secretary of the Commonwealth of Massachusetts (1995–present)
- Oz Griebel, class of 1977, 2010 Republican candidate for governor of Connecticut
- John Hynes, class of 1924, 49th mayor of Boston (1950–1960), namesake of Boston's Hynes Convention Center
- Brian A. Joyce, class of 1990, Massachusetts state senator from Norfolk, Bristol and Plymouth districts (1998–2017)
- Thomas J. Lane, class of 1925, U.S. representative from Massachusetts (1941–1963)
- Garreth Lynch, member of the Massachusetts House of Representatives
- Patrick C. Lynch, class of 1992, attorney general of Rhode Island (2003–2011)
- Ian Mackey, class of 2017, member of the Missouri General Assembly
- Juana Matias, class of 2014, state representative
- Joe Moakley, class of 1956, U.S. representative from Massachusetts (1973–2001)
- Kate Murray, supervisor of Hempstead, New York
- Steven C. Panagiotakos, class of 1989, Massachusetts state senator from 1st Middlesex district (1992–2011)
- John F. Quinn, class of 1990, member of the Massachusetts House of Representatives from Bristol's 9th district (1992–2011)
- John H. Rogers, class of 1992, member of the Massachusetts House of Representatives from Norfolk's 12th district (1992–present)
- Nelson D. Simons, class of 1925, chief of Mashpee tribe, town official
- Bruce Tarr, class of 1989, Massachusetts state senator from 1st Essex and Middlesex districts (1994–present)
- John F. Tierney, class of 1976, U.S. representative from Massachusetts (1997–2015)
- Timothy J. Toomey, Jr., class of 1985, member of the Massachusetts House of Representatives from Middlesex's 26th district (1992–2016)
- Cleon Turner, class of 1992, member of the Massachusetts House of Representatives from Barnstable's 1st district (2005–2015)
- Guy Velella (R), New York State Senator indicted for bribery and conspiracy; pleaded guilty to one count in a plea bargain and received a year in jail, but served 182 days.
- Richard Vetere, playwright and screenwriter
- Marian Walsh, class of 1984, Massachusetts state senator from Suffolk and Norfolk districts (1992–2011)
- Daniel K. Webster, class of 1994, member of the Massachusetts House of Representatives from the 6th Plymouth District (2002–2013)
- Nina Mitchell Wells, secretary of state of New Jersey (2006–2010)
- Louis G. Whitcomb, class of 1929, U.S. attorney for Vermont

== Judicial ==
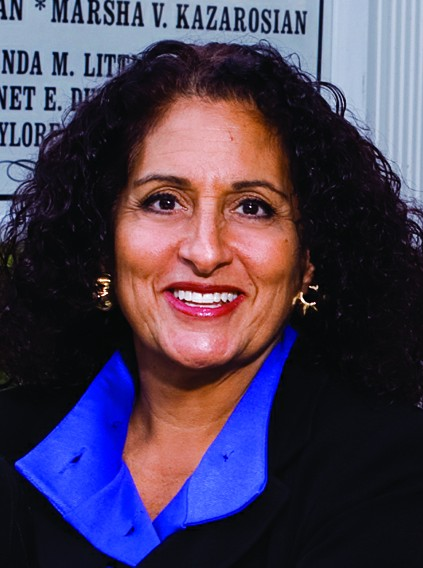
Marsha Kazarosian

- Peter Agnes, class of 1975, associate justice, Massachusetts Appeals Court, Massachusetts
- Jonathan W. Blodgett, class of 1983, current district attorney for Essex County, Massachusetts
- Frank Caprio, class of 1965, television judge on Caught in Providence on ABC, chief judge of Providence, RI Municipal Court
- Daniel F. Conley, class of 1983, district attorney for Boston (Suffolk County)
- Elspeth B. Cypher, class of 1986, current justice of the Massachusetts Supreme Judicial Court
- Linda S. Dalianis, class of 1974, chief justice of the New Hampshire Supreme Court (2010–2018)
- Frank Donahue, class of 1921, longest-serving justice of the Superior Court of Massachusetts (forty-two years)
- John E. Fenton, class of 1924, chief justice of Massachusetts Land Court 1937–1965
- Francis Flaherty, class of 1975, justice of Rhode Island Supreme Court
- Frank Gaziano, class of 1989, justice of the Massachusetts Supreme Judicial Court
- Gustavo Gelpí, class of 1991, United States District Court judge for the District of Puerto Rico
- Serge Georges Jr., class of 1996, associate justice of the Massachusetts Supreme Judicial Court
- Maureen Goldberg, class of 1978, justice of Rhode Island Supreme Court
- Timothy S. Hillman, class of 1973, U.S. District Court of Massachusetts, judge (2011–present)
- Marsha Kazarosian, class of 1982, attorney, handled high-profile cases
- William R. Keating, class of 1985, U.S. congressman, former district attorney for Norfolk County, Massachusetts
- Richard J. Leon, class of 1974, U.S. District Court of the District of Columbia, judge (2002–present)
- Gerard Leone, class of 1989, current district attorney for Middlesex County, Massachusetts
- Martin F. Loughlin, class of 1951, U.S. District Court of New Hampshire, judge (1979–1995)
- Mary S. McElroy, class of 1992, U.S. District Court of Rhode Island, judge (2019–present)
- Paul Reiber, class of 1974, chief justice of the Vermont Supreme Court
- Robert Rufo, class of 1975, Superior Court justice, Massachusetts
- Michael Sullivan, U.S. attorney for the District of Massachusetts
- Paul Suttell, class of 1976, chief justice of Rhode Island Supreme Court
- Samuel Zoll, class of 1962, chief judge of the Massachusetts District Court

== Academia and business ==
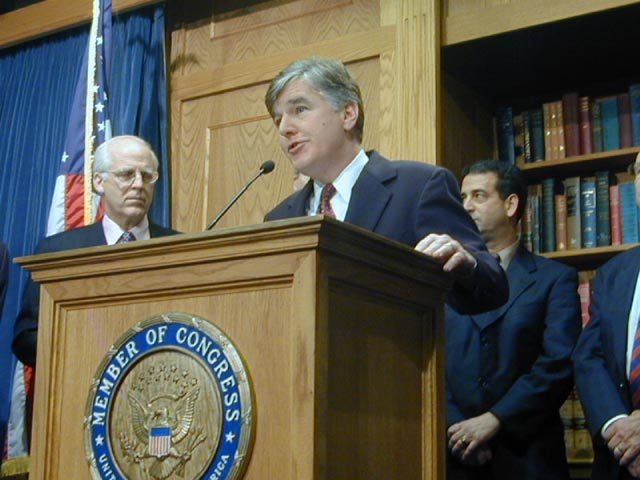
Marty Meehan, Class of 1983, chancellor of UMass, Lowell, former U.S. congressman

- John E. Fenton, class of 1924, president of Suffolk Law School
- Jerald G. Fishman, class of 1976, president and CEO, Analog Devices
- Neil Goldman, class of 1976, chief legal and regulatory officer of Skype
- John Inge, class of 1974, chief counsel and partner for Orrick, Herrington & Sutcliffe
- Ronald Machtley, class of 1978, president of Bryant University (1996–present), former U.S. representative from Rhode Island (1989–1995)
- Martin Meehan, class of 1983, U.S. representative from Massachusetts (1993–2007), current chancellor of University of Massachusetts Lowell
- Gunnar S. Overstrom, Jr., class of 1968, vice-chair of Fleet Boston; president and chief operating officer of the Shawmut National Corporation
- Tranquil Salvador III, LLM Class of 2009, Filipino lawyer, educator, civic leader, columnist, and media advocate for mainstreaming and popularizing law education in the Philippines
- David Sargent, class of 1954, former president of Suffolk University (1989–2010)
- Léo Valentin, Class of 1948, inventor of the Bird Man Suit, a predecessor of modern-day wingsuit flying

== Arts, entertainment, media, and letters ==
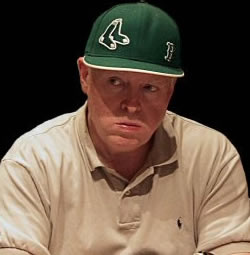
Dan Harrington, professional poker player

- Gleason Archer Jr., class of 1939, theologian
- James Bamford, class of 1975, author
- Paul Benedict, class of 1960, actor
- Dan Harrington, professional poker player
- Cheryl Jacques, class of 1987, former executive director of the Human Rights Campaign
- Stephen Kurkjian, class of 1970, Pulitzer Prize-winning investigative journalist
- Michelle Leonardo, class of 2013, Miss New Jersey USA 2012, Miss New Jersey Teen USA 2008 and Top 10 at Miss USA 2012
- John Loftus, class of 1977, author, television commentator
- Jenna Marbles, class of 2008, YouTube personality
- Gerald Peary, professor of Communication and Journalism at Suffolk University
- James Sokolove, class of 1969, television personal injury attorney
- Spose, rapper
- Joan Vennochi, class of 1984, Pulitzer Prize-winning investigative journalist

== Presidents of Suffolk University (1906–present) ==
- Gleason Archer, Sr. (1906–1948)
- Walter Burse (1948–1954)
- Robert Munce (1954–1960)
- Dennis C. Haley (1960–1965)
- John E. Fenton (1965–1970)
- Thomas Fulham (1970–1980)
- Daniel Perlman (1980–1989)
- David Sargent (1989–2010)
- Barry Brown (2010–2012) (interim)
- James McCarthy (2012–2014)
- Norman Smith (2014–2015) (interim)
- Margaret McKenna (2015–2016)
- Marisa Kelly (2016–present)
