= Suffolk College =

Suffolk College or Suffolk University may refer to:

== United Kingdom ==
- Suffolk New College, Ipswich
- University of Suffolk, in Suffolk and Norfolk
- West Suffolk College, Bury St Edmunds

== United States ==
- Suffolk County Community College, Selden, New York
- Suffolk University, Boston, Massachusetts
  - Suffolk College of Arts and Sciences, part of Suffolk University
