= Walter Burse =

Walter M. Burse (1898-1970) served as the second president of Suffolk University in Boston, Massachusetts from 1948 to 1954.

Walter Burse graduated from Brown University in 1920 and then Harvard Law School in 1923 and began practicing law that year. He served as president of the Boston Exchange Club and a director of the New England School of Art. Burse became a trustee of Suffolk University in 1946 and was appointed president in 1948 to replace Suffolk founder Gleason Archer, Sr. Burse served until 1954 and died in 1970.

Burse also served as an officer of the New England Concrete Masonry Association The Walter M. Burse Forensic Society, a debating society at Suffolk is named in his honor.
