= Great Pond, Maine =

Town in Maine, United States

- Town
- Location within Maine Location within the United States
- Coordinates: 44°59′40″N 68°17′33″W
- Country: United States
- State: Maine
- County: Hancock

Area
  - Total: 39.89 sq mi (103.31 km^{2})
  - Land: 37.76 sq mi (97.80 km^{2})
  - Water: 2.13 sq mi (5.52 km^{2})
- Elevation: 285 ft (87 m)

Population (2020)
  - Total: 61
  - Density: 1.6/sq mi (0.6/km^{2})
- Time zone: UTC-05:00 (EST)
  - Summer (DST): UTC-04:00 (EDT)
- ZIP code: 04408
- Area code: 207
- FIPS code: 23-28975
- GNIS feature ID: 582498
- Website: https://townofgreatpond.wixsite.com/gpredesign

Great Pond is a town in Hancock County, Maine, United States. The population was 61 at the 2020 census.

Gleason Archer Sr. (1880–1966), the founder and first president of Suffolk University in Boston, was born in Great Pond. He was also the author of many legal textbooks.

== Geography ==
According to the United States Census Bureau, the town has a total area of 39.89 square miles (103.31 km^{2}), of which 37.76 square miles (97.80 km^{2}) is land and 2.13 square miles (5.52 km^{2}) is water.

== Demographics ==
Historical population
Census	Pop.	Note	%±
1960	58		—
1970	43		−25.9%
1980	45		4.7%
1990	59		31.1%
2000	47		−20.3%
2010	58		23.4%
2020	61		5.2%
U.S. Decennial Census

=== 2010 census ===
As of the census of 2010, there were 58 people, 26 households, and 17 families living in the town. The population density was 1.5 inhabitants per square mile (0.6/km^{2}). There were 85 housing units at an average density of 2.3 per square mile (0.9/km^{2}). The racial makeup of the town was 96.6% White, 1.7% Native American, and 1.7% from two or more races. Hispanic or Latino of any race were 6.9% of the population.

There were 26 households, of which 15.4% had children under the age of 18 living with them, 50.0% were married couples living together, 11.5% had a female householder with no husband present, 3.8% had a male householder with no wife present, and 34.6% were non-families. 26.9% of all households were made up of individuals, and 3.8% had someone living alone who was 65 years of age or older. The average household size was 2.23 and the average family size was 2.59.

The median age in the town was 50.3 years. 13.8% of residents were under the age of 18; 5.1% were between the ages of 18 and 24; 15.5% were from 25 to 44; 48.3% were from 45 to 64; and 17.2% were 65 years of age or older. The gender makeup of the town was 53.4% male and 46.6% female.

=== 2000 census ===
As of the census of 2000, there were 47 people, 19 households, and 14 families living in the town. The population density was 1.3 people per square mile (0.50 people/km^{2}). There were 67 housing units at an average density of 1.8 per square mile (0.69/km^{2}). The racial makeup of the town was 87.23% White, 2.13% African American, 2.13% Asian, and 8.51% from two or more races.

There were 19 households, out of which 42.1% had children under the age of 18 living with them, 63.2% were married couples living together, 5.3% had a female householder with no husband present, and 26.3% were non-families. 21.1% of all households were made up of individuals, and 15.8% had someone living alone who was 65 years of age or older. The average household size was 2.47 and the average family size was 2.79.

In the town, the population was spread out, with 27.7% under the age of 18, 4.3% from 18 to 24, 27.7% from 25 to 44, 23.4% from 45 to 64, and 17.0% who were 65 years of age or older. The median age was 41 years. For every 100 females, there were 104.3 males. For every 100 females age 18 and over, there were 112.5 males.

The median income for a household in the town was $32,083, and the median income for a family was $32,083. Males had a median income of $32,250 versus $0 for females. The per capita income for the town was $16,207. There were no families and 4.8% of the population living below the poverty line, including no under eighteens and 40.0% of those over 64.

== Notable person ==
- Gleason Archer Sr., first president of Suffolk University and Suffolk Law School in Boston, Massachusetts
