= Sokolove Law =

American personal injury and mass tort law firm

- Headquarters: Chestnut Hill, Massachusetts, United States
- Major practice areas: Personal injury, mass torts, mesothelioma, birth injuries, nursing home abuse, lung cancer, disability denial
- Key people: Michael Skoler (chief executive officer); Ricky A. LeBlanc (managing attorney)
- Date founded: 1979
- Founder: Jim Sokolove
- Company type: Limited liability company

Sokolove Law is an American personal injury and mass tort law firm based in Chestnut Hill, Massachusetts. Founded in 1979, the firm practises principally in asbestos and mesothelioma litigation, medical malpractice and other personal injury claims. The firm also handles a wide range of cases, including birth injuries, nursing home abuse, sexual assault, and medical malpractice.

== History ==
The firm was founded in 1979 by attorney Jim Sokolove. Following the U.S. Supreme Court decision in Bates v. State Bar of Arizona (1977), which held that lawyer advertising is protected commercial speech, Sokolove was among the first American lawyers to advertise heavily on television, and in the 1980s his firm was one of the first to combine television commercials with a toll-free number.

In January 1999 the firm shifted its advertising focus toward medical malpractice, launching 63 new commercials. The campaign's creative director said the change was deliberate, as automobile accident work had become crowded and the firm turned to the other side of its practice. By 2007 the firm was associating with attorneys in about 30 states.

In January 2010 the Rhode Island Supreme Court allowed the firm to register in that state, which the ABA Journal described as its 49th; the decision is discussed below.

Jim Sokolove retired as chairman in 2013. As of 2026, Michael Skoler serves as chief executive officer and Ricky A. LeBlanc as managing attorney.

== Practice areas ==
The firm made its name locally in automobile accident work and nationally in mesothelioma and asbestos claims, which remain its best-known practice. Asbestos claimants may pursue recovery both through tort suits against manufacturers and through claims against asbestos trust funds established in bankruptcy proceedings.

The firm moved into medical malpractice advertising in 1999, and its portfolio later broadened to other kinds of personal injury claims. Case types it has handled or marketed include birth injury, disability denial, firefighting foam, lung cancer, nursing home abuse, dangerous drugs and medical devices, sexual abuse, and workplace injury.

The firm represents plaintiffs in litigation against Monsanto and Bayer alleging that the herbicide Roundup causes cancer. In 2026, managing attorney Ricky LeBlanc commented publicly on the U.S. Supreme Court's hearing in Monsanto Co. v. Durnell.

== Business model ==
Sokolove Law has been described in the legal trade press as one of the most prominent examples of high-volume legal advertising in the United States and paved the way for attorney advertising as we know it. The firm has been recognized in industry publications, including being named one of the "Best Law Firms for Mass Tort Litigation" by ''U.S. News & World Report''. The firm holds an A+ rating from the Better Business Bureau and a "Preeminent" peer rating from Martindale-Hubbell.

According to a 2014 ''ABA Journal'' report, the firm spends between $30 million and $40 million annually on advertising, and was ranked fifth in projected legal advertising spending in 2015 by Kantar Media.

A 2015 report by the U.S. Chamber Institute for Legal Reform placed the firm among the largest legal television advertisers in the country.

The firm has also sponsored Miles for Meso, an annual race that raises funds for mesothelioma research.
