= Suffolk College of Arts and Sciences =

Division of Suffolk University, Massachusetts

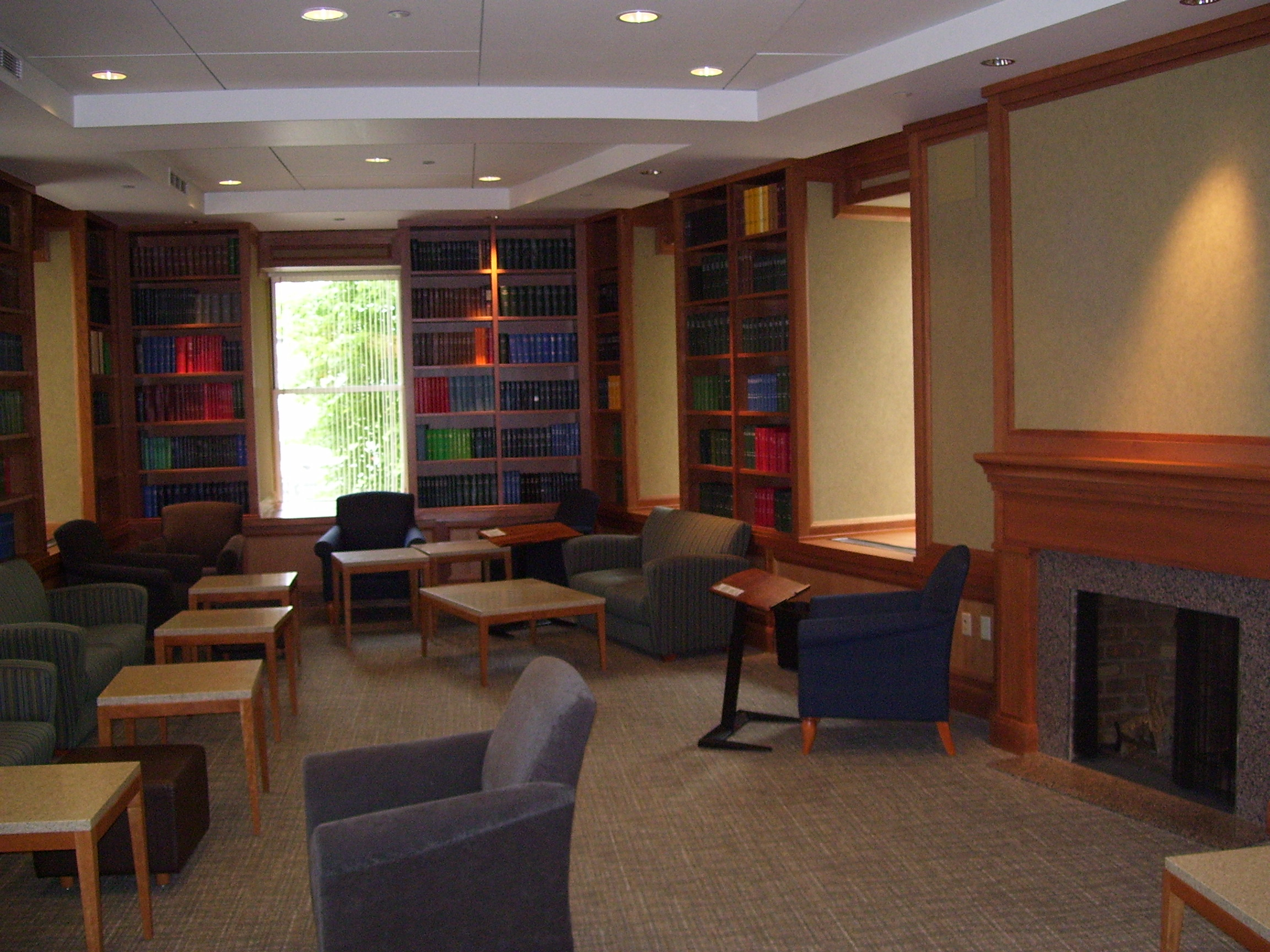
Sawyer Library, 2007

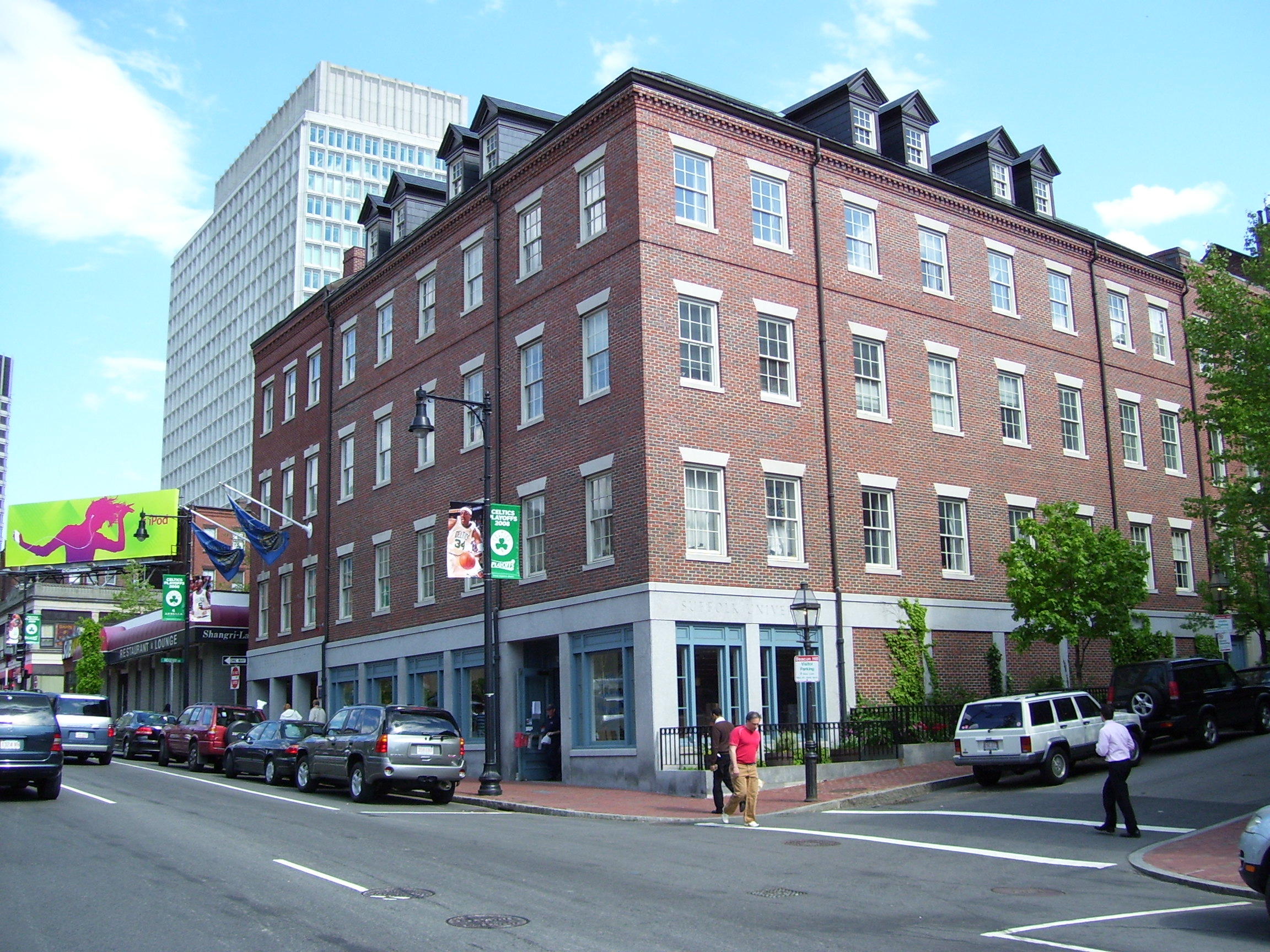
Ridgeway Building, housing Suffolk's Reagan Gymnasium and the campus book store.

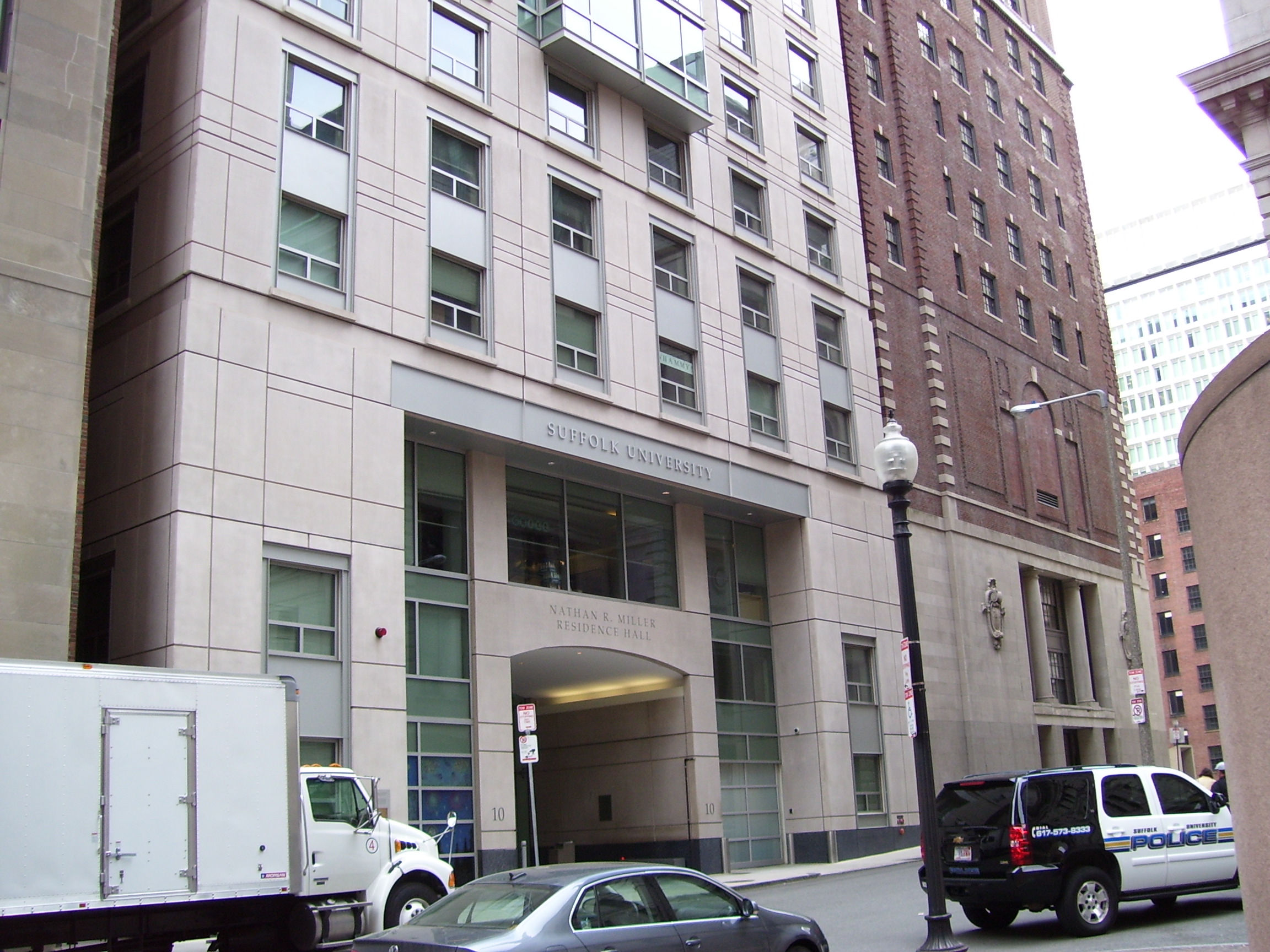
Nathan R. Miller dormitory built in 2005

Suffolk University College of Arts and Sciences is the undergraduate and graduate division of Suffolk University in Boston, Massachusetts. Suffolk was founded in 1906 and the College of Arts and Sciences was founded in 1934 by Gleason Leonard Archer. The college confers Bachelor of Arts (B.A.) or Bachelor of Science (B.S.), Bachelor of Fine Arts (B.F.A.), Master of Arts (M.A.), Master of Education (M.Ed.), Master of Science (M.S.), and Doctor of Philosophy (Ph.D.) degrees and several others.

== Academics ==
The Suffolk College of Arts and Sciences has seventeen academic departments which offer more than seventy undergraduate and graduate programs, ranging from engineering and biology to theater to art and design and economics. The school has honors program for qualified candidates. The university also offers various opportunities at its research institutes, including: Beacon Hill Institute, Center for Crime & Justice Policy Research, Center for Restorative Justice, Center for Women's Health and Human Right, Poetry Center, and Political Research Center, R.S. Friedman Field Station, and Sagan Energy Research Laboratory. The New England School of Art and Design, founded in 1923, has been a department of the college since merging in 1996.

In 2011 U.S. News ranked Suffolk #60 in Regional Universities (North). In 2009 U.S. News ranked Suffolk in the "top tier of "Best Master's Universities" in the North" and #7 in "Best College: Most International Students" attending master's programs." Suffolk is also listed annually in the Princeton Review rankings of "The Best 376 Colleges", including a ranking in the top 25 entrepreneurship programs in the United States.

== Athletics and student organizations ==
12 athletic teams from Suffolk compete in the NCAA Division III. Suffolk is a member of the NCAA National Collegiate Athletic Association, ECAC– Eastern College Athletic Conference, and GNAC– Great Northeast Athletic Conference. The university is located nearby the TD Banknorth Garden, home to the Boston Celtics and Bruins. The Ridgeway Building on Cambridge Street contains the university's Reagan Gymnasium and fitness facility.. The student organizations on campus are:

- American Chemical Society (ACS)
- Asian American Association (AAA)
- Best Buddies
- Beta Beta Beta (Tri-Beta)
- Black Student Union (BSU)
- Cape Verdean Student Association (CVSA)
- Capital Asset Group
- Caribbean Student Network (CSN)
- CAS Peer Mentors
- College Democrats
- College Republicans (Suffolk GOP)
- Collegiate Investors Association (CIA)
- Commuter Students Association (CSA)
- Dance Company
- Eco Ambassadors
- Economics Club
- Entrepreneurship Club
- Environmental Club
- Fashion Industry Network
- Future Investors in Real Estate (F.I.R.E.)
- Graduate Student Association (GSA)
- Health Careers Club
- Hellenic Association (HA)
- Hillel
- Hispanic Association (SUHA)
- History Society
- In House Design
- Information Systems (IS Club)
- International Business Club (IBC)
- International Student Association (ISA)
- Italian-American Student Union (IASU)
- Jazz Ensemble
- Knitting Club
- Latinos on the Move (LOTM)
- Mirembe On My Mind
- Model United Nations (MUN)
- Musilim Student Association
- National Association of Black Accountants (NABA)
- Paintball Club
- Paralegal Association
- Paranormal Club (Paranormal)
- Performing Arts Office (PAO)
- Philosophy Society
- Pre Law Association
- Professional Marketing Association (PMA)
- Program Council (PC)
- Project Nur
- Psychology Club
- Rainbow Alliance
- Ready, Set, Act! Children's Theater
- Residence Hall Association (RHA)
- Russian Speakers Association
- Seriously Bent Improv Comedy Troup (Seriously Bent)
- SGA- Finance Committee (FinCom)
- Sigma Alpha Epsilon (SAE)
- Sigma Gamma Rho (SGR)
- Ski and Snowboard Club
- Soulfully Versed A Capella Group (Soulfully Versed)
- South Asian Student Association
- Step Team
- Student Government Association (SGA)
- Student Judicial Review Board (SJRB)
- Student Leadership and Involvement (SLI)
- Student Political Science Association
- Suffolk Bikes
- Suffolk Free Radio
- Suffolk Smile Train (Smile Train)
- Suffolk Snidgets: Suffolk University's Quidditch Team (Quidditch)
- Suffolk University Book Club (Booklub)
- Suffolk University Coalition of Reason (SUCOR)
- Suffolk University Mathematics Society (SUMS)
- Suffolk University Mock Trial (SUMTT)
- SUNORML (The National Organization for the Reform of Marijuana Laws)
- Techies Union
- The French Club
- The Journey Leadership Program (The Journey)
- The Photo Club
- The Ramifications A Capella Group (The Ramifications)
- The Suffolk Journal (The Journal)
- The Suffolk Voice (The Voice)
- Theta Phi Alpha
- Who's Askin'? Sketch Comedy Troupe (Who's Askin'?)

== Image gallery ==
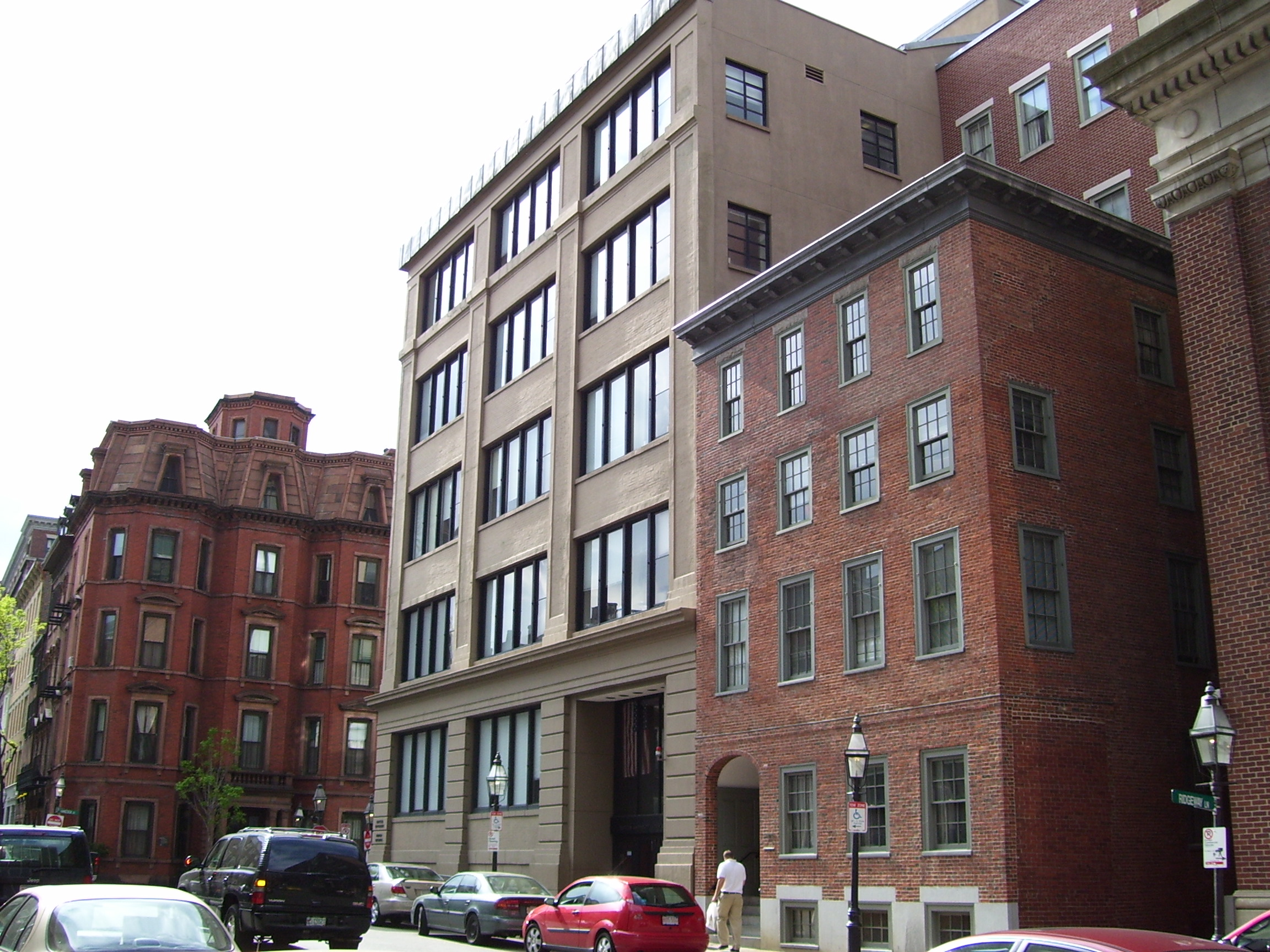
Fenton Building, 1913.

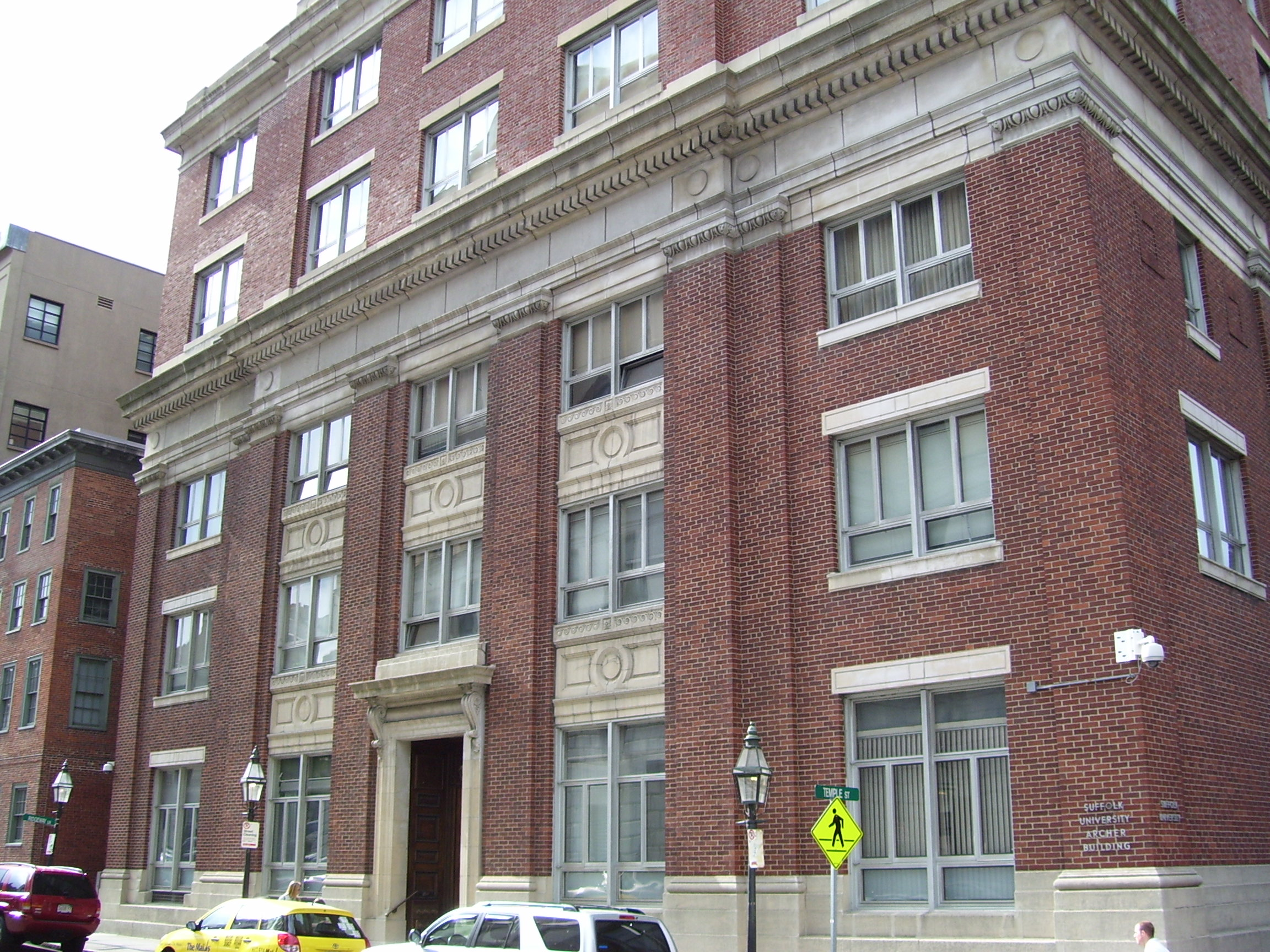
Archer Building, 1920.

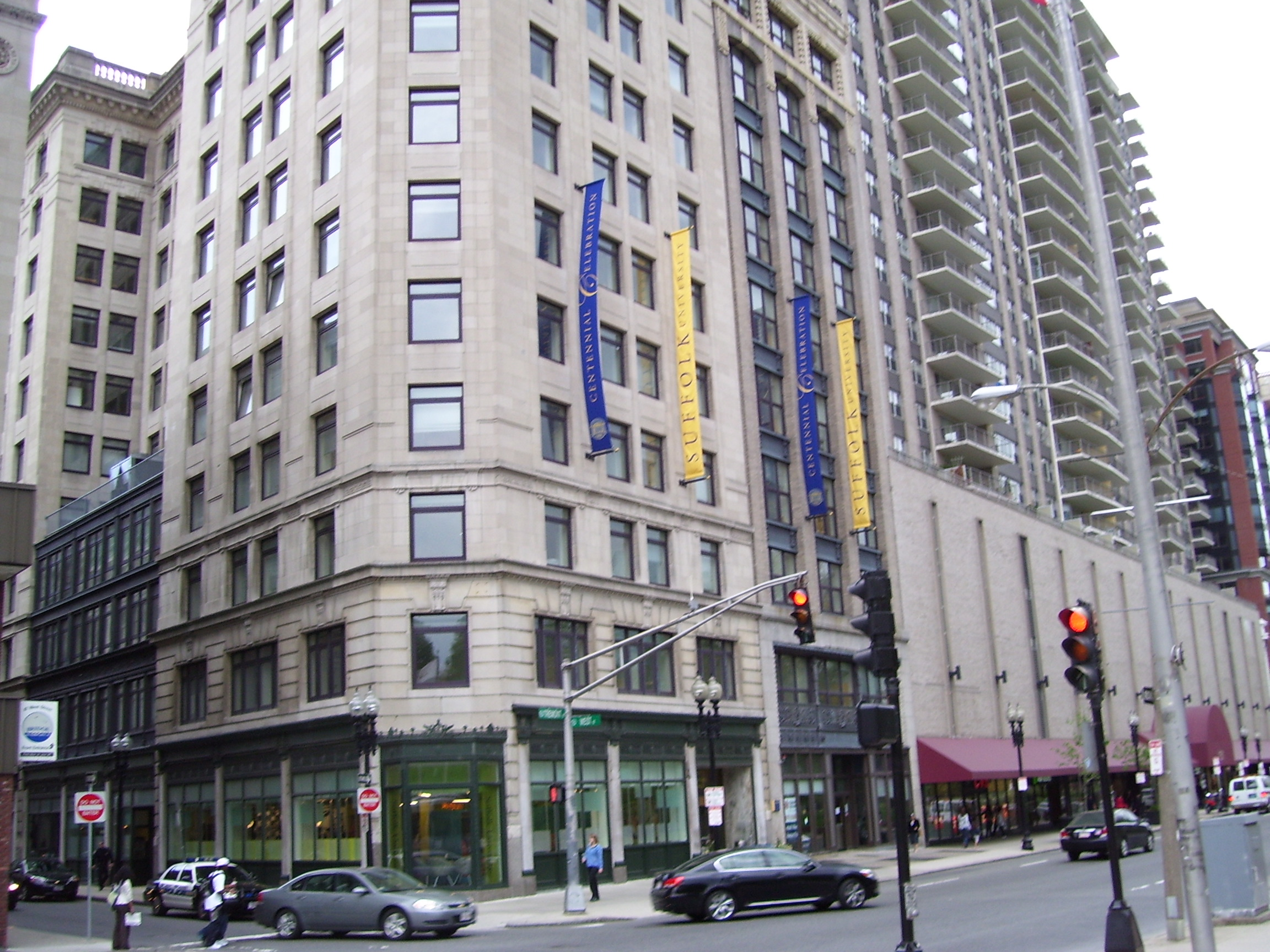
150 Tremont Street houses a Suffolk cafeteria and dormitory.

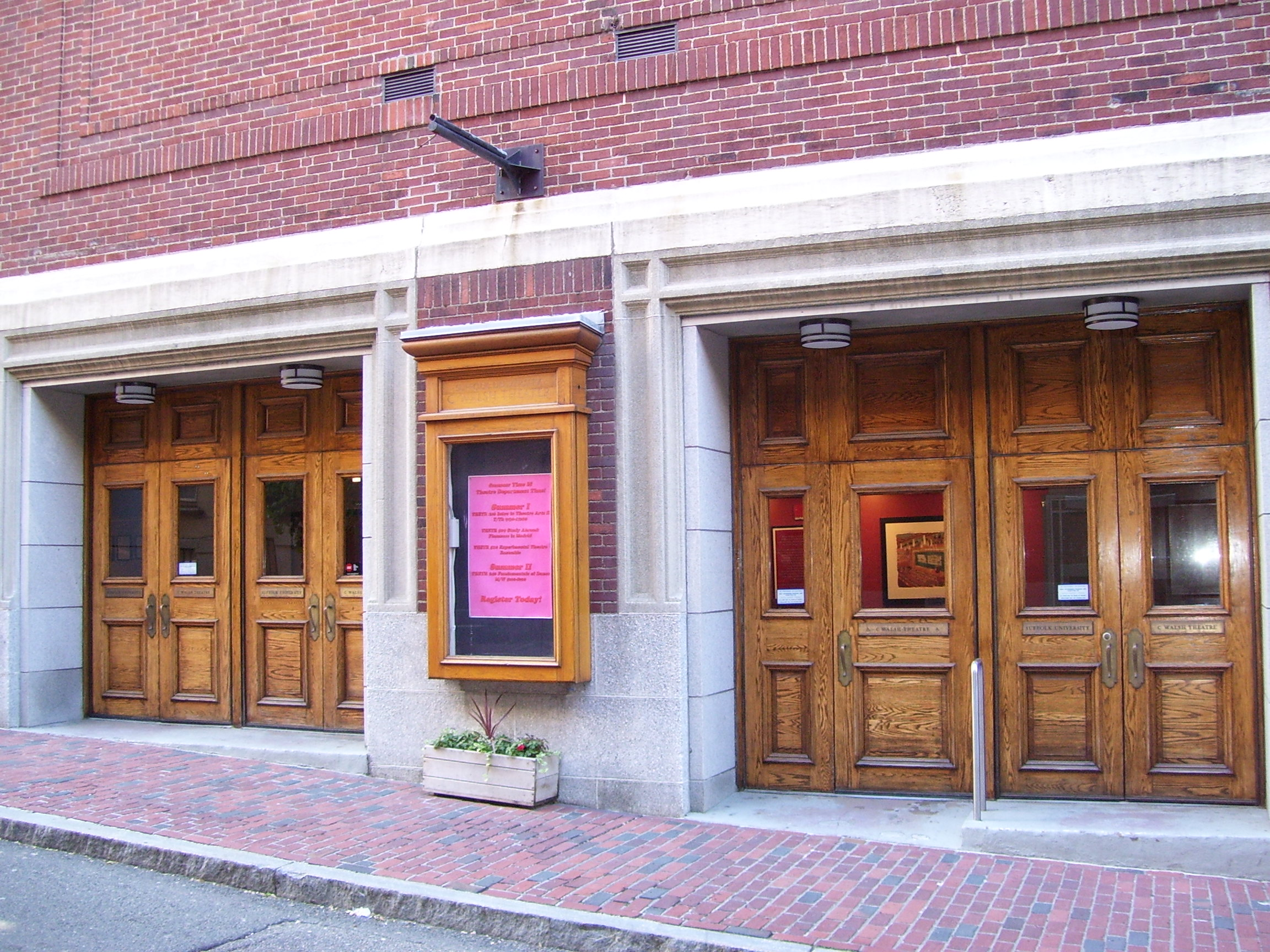
Walsh Theater

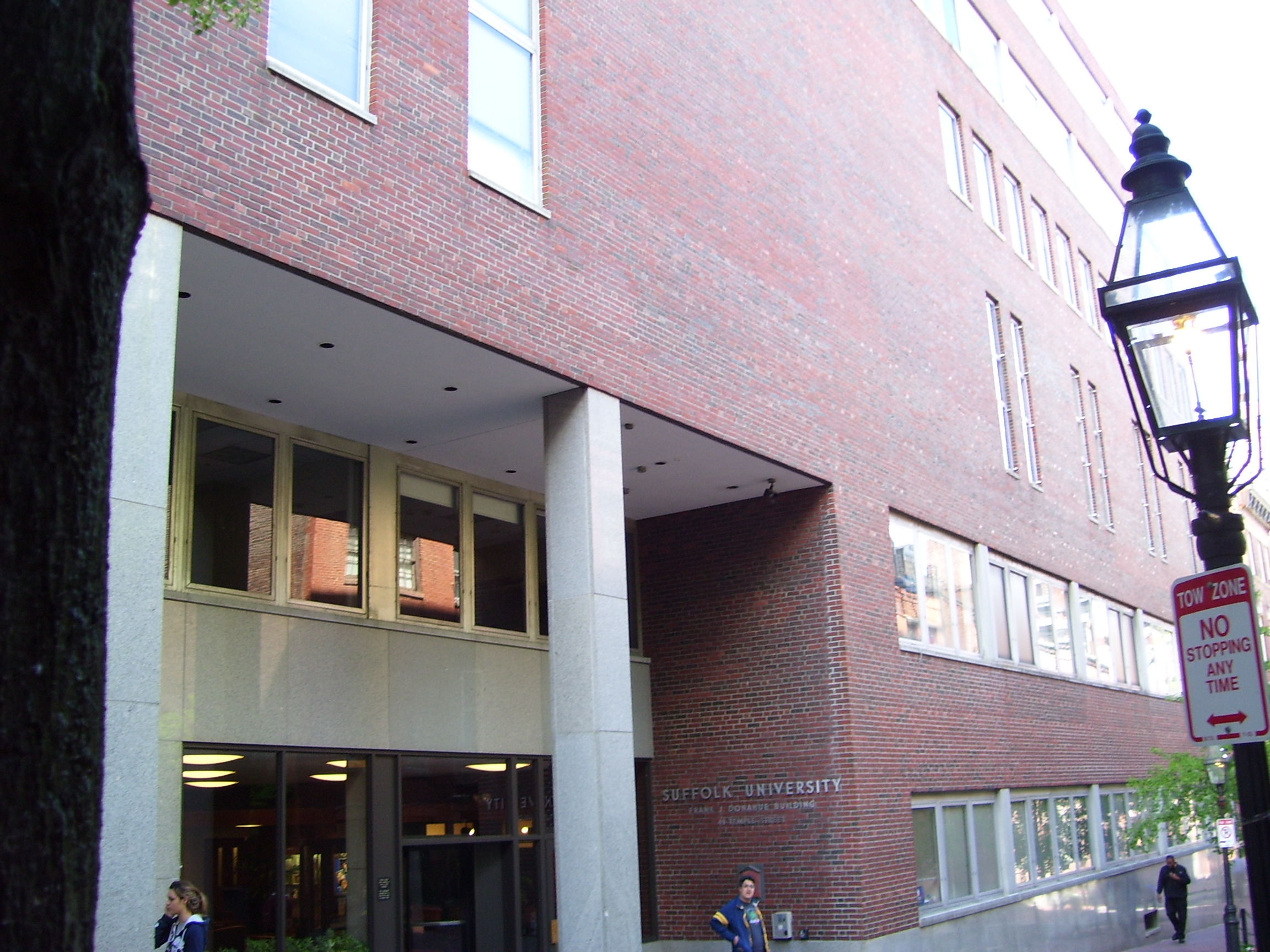
Donahue Building

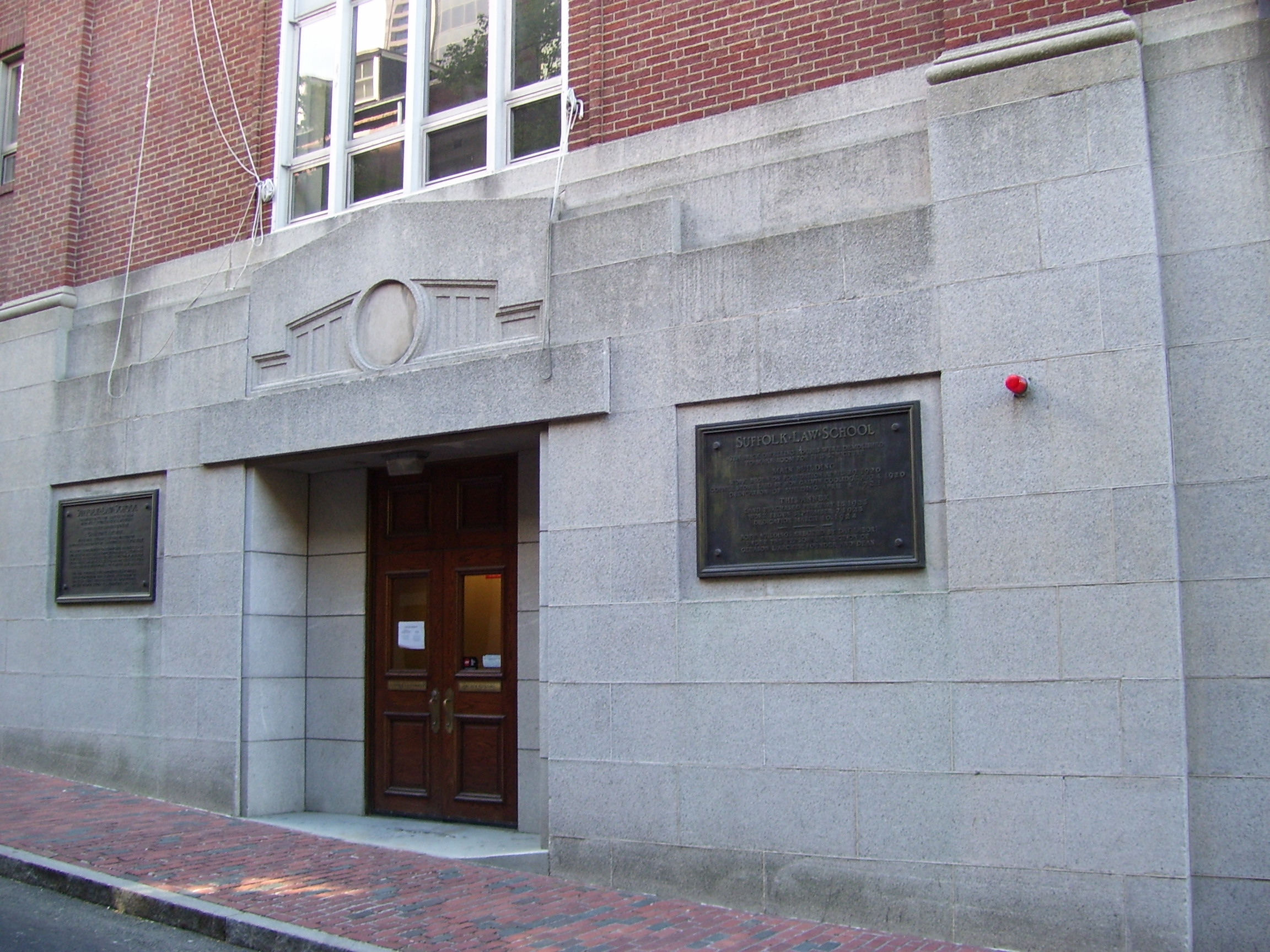
Walsh Theater Building

== See also ==
- Suffolk University
- Suffolk University Law School
- Sawyer Business School
- List of Suffolk University people

== External links and references ==
- Official SUCAS website
