= New England School of Art and Design =

Coordinates: 42.3506°N 71.0704°W

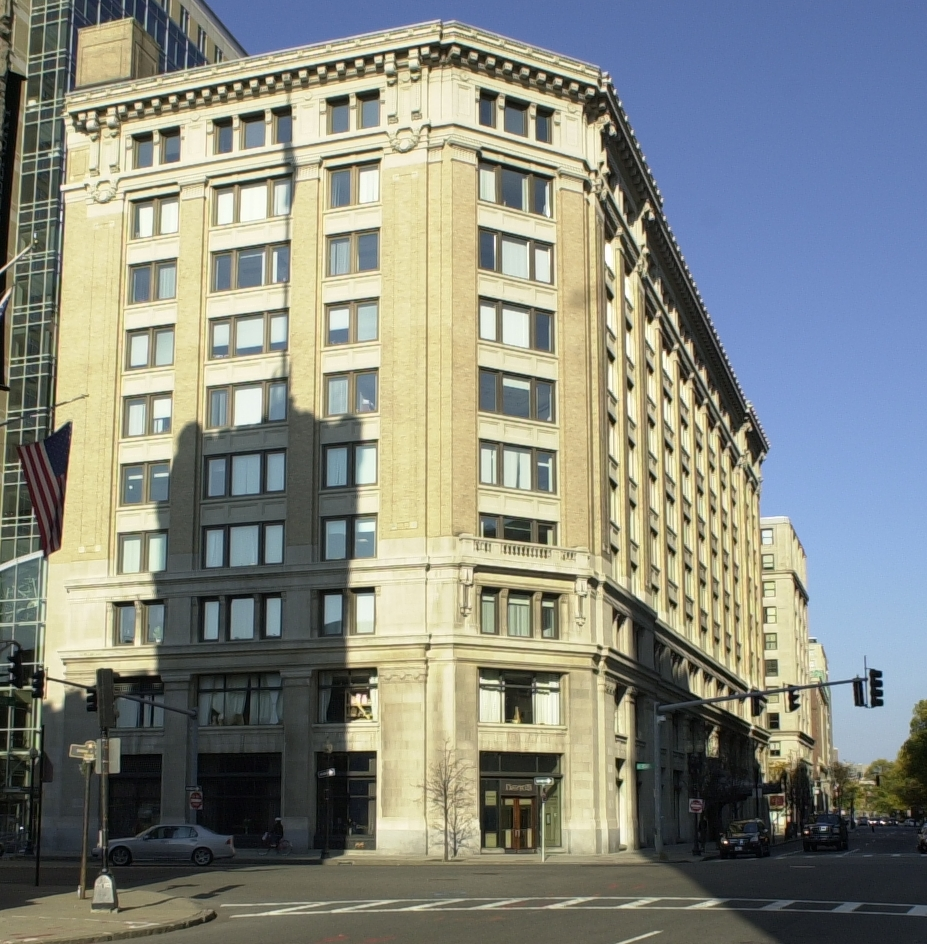
- Type: Private
- Established: 1923
- Location: Boston, Massachusetts, U.S.
- Campus: Urban
- Website: www2.suffolk.edu/nesad

The New England School of Art and Design at Suffolk University is a school of fine arts and design located in Boston, Massachusetts. The school offers undergraduate (BFA) and graduate (MA) degrees, as well as continuing education courses and programs. The School of Art & Design is accredited by the National Association of Schools of Art and Design (NASAD). The BFA program in Interior Design and MA program in Interior Architecture & Design are accredited by the Council for Interior Design Accreditation (CIDA). Suffolk University is accredited by the New England Association of Schools and Colleges.

== History ==
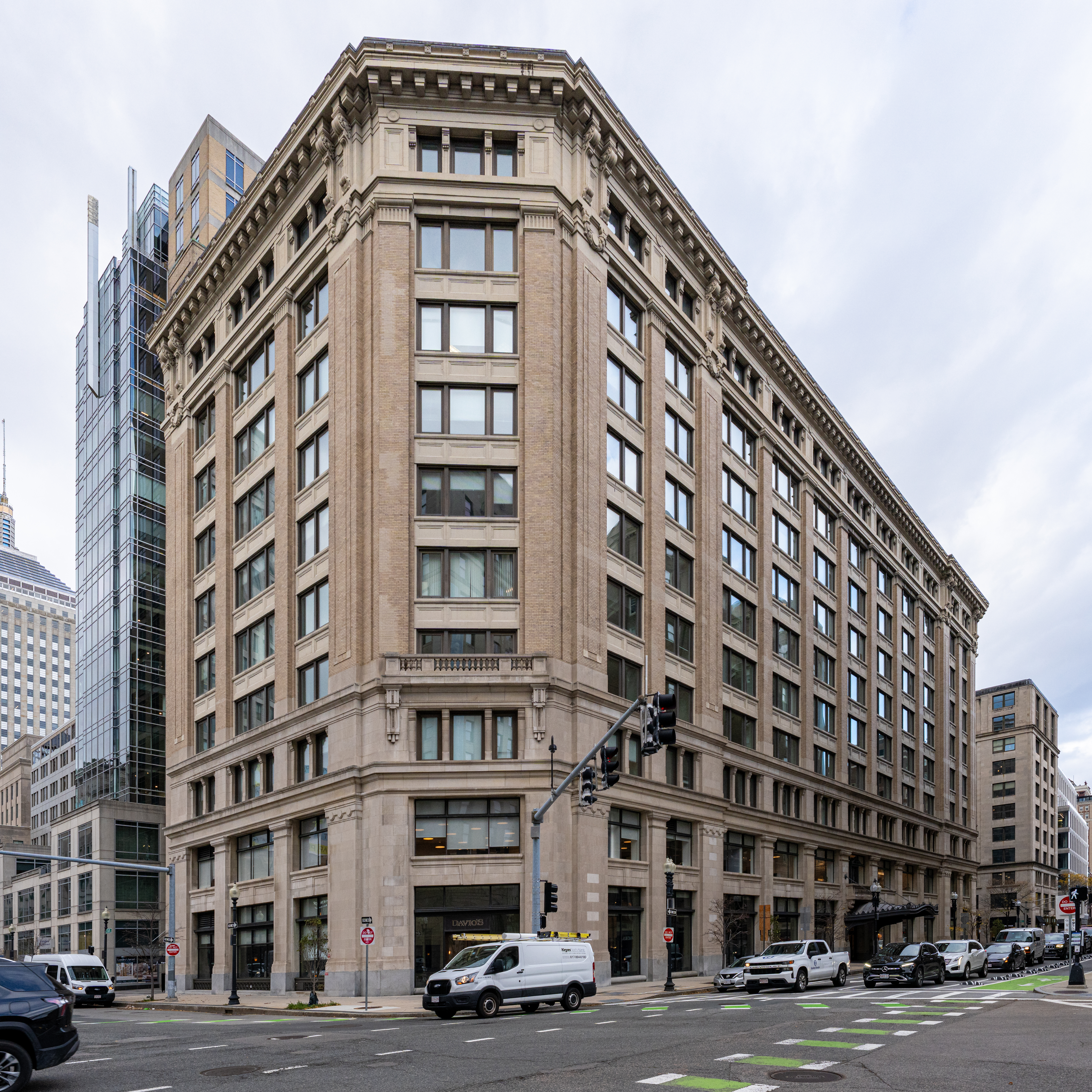
75 Arlington Street, also known as the former Paine Furniture Building, is the site of the galleries of the New England School of Art and Design

The school was founded in 1923 as the New England School of Art on Huntington Ave. on the same block as Symphony Hall. It was known by this name until 1975, when:

it was renamed The New England School of Art & Design and at the same time, moved to 28 Newbury Street where it resided for the next twenty years. The School of Art & Design is currently located at 75 Arlington Street in Boston's Back Bay, where it occupies over 43,000 square feet in a modern facility with state-of-the-art classrooms, studios and equipment ... The academic collaboration between The New England School of Art & Design and Suffolk University began in 1988 with an articulation agreement, allowing art and design students to enroll in Suffolk courses. The following year joint Bachelor of Fine Arts degrees were offered in Fine Arts, Graphic Design and Interior Design. In 1996, the two institutions successfully merged, and The School of Art & Design became a department within the College of Art & Sciences.

== Programs and degrees ==
The New England School of Art & Design offers undergraduate (Bachelor of Fine Arts) degrees, as well as graduate degrees (Master of Arts), continuing education courses and high school programs. Concentrations in fine arts, graphic design, interior design and interior architecture are offered.

== Rankings ==
The New England School of Art Design at Suffolk University received recognition by being ranked as one of the "Top 10" best interior design programs in the United States by DesignIntelligence Magazine in 2010. NESAD was selected among a few of the nation's leading design schools and noticeably displayed on the "2011 America's Best Architecture and Design Schools" list, featured in the November/December 2011 issue of DesignIntelligence Magazine. The school was again named to the "Top 10" list of "America's Best Architecture and Design Schools" for 2012 and 2013 (graduate program).

== Gallery ==
Suffolk University Art Gallery is New England School of Art & Design's main exhibition space. Located in the heart of the school, the gallery's exhibition program reflects a wide range of art and design representing all fields of study offered by the art school and in so doing, presents a multiplicity of ideas and issues. Annual exhibits of current student work and biannual exhibits of faculty work provides an important pedagogical link between and for students, faculty, and visitors. The goal of the gallery is to create exciting exhibits and related programs, reflecting our ever increasing visual and image - driven world, and to engage the School of Art & Design and Suffolk University communities as well as adding to a larger conversation in the Boston cultural arena. The Suffolk University Art Gallery is free and open to the public.

== See also ==
- Suffolk University
- Suffolk College of Arts and Sciences
- Suffolk Law School
