= Sawyer Business School =

Business school of Suffolk University

Coordinates: 42.359°N 71.062°W

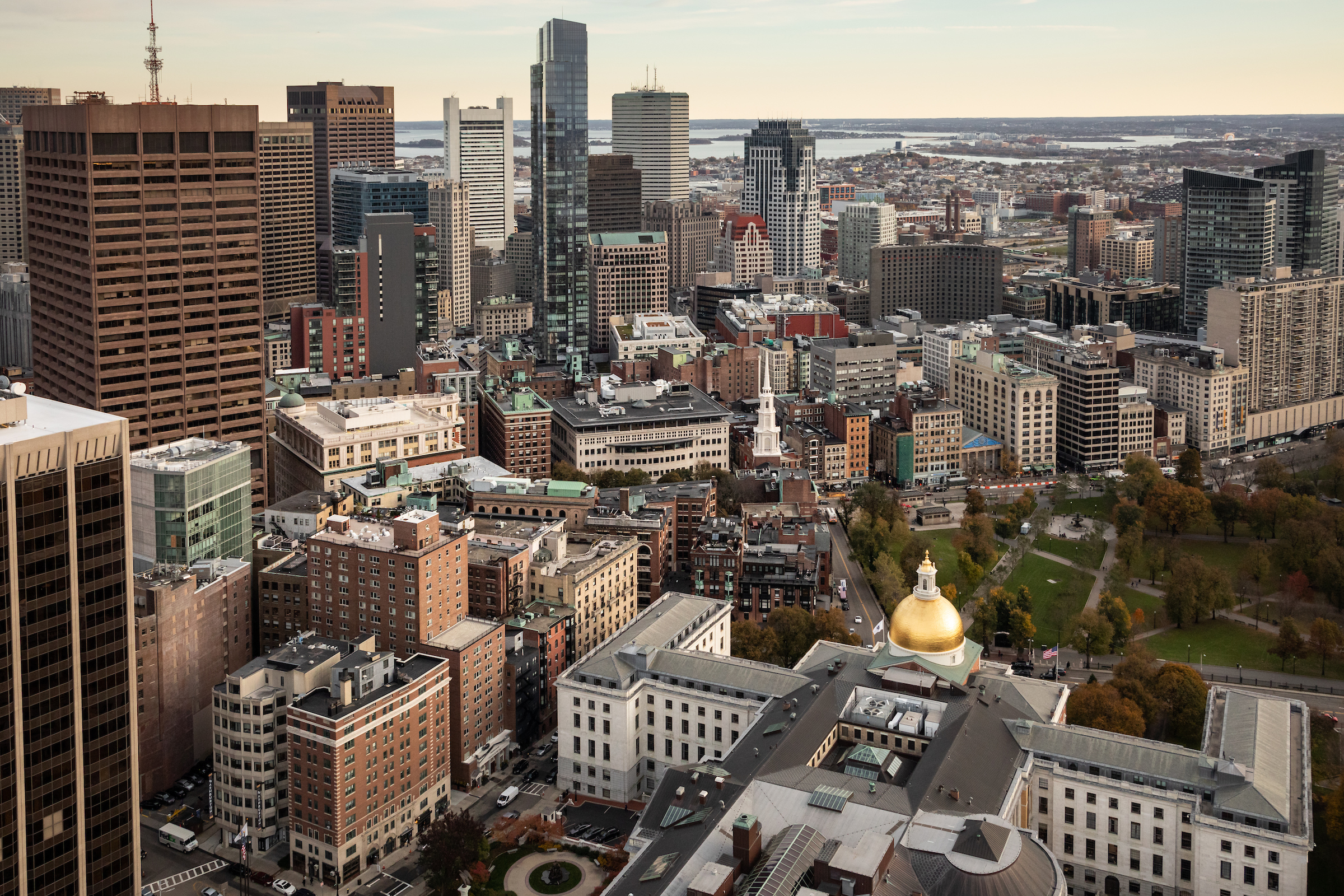
Suffolk University's Sawyer Business School is located in downtown Boston.

The Sawyer Business School is one of the three schools comprising Suffolk University in Boston, Massachusetts. Suffolk was founded in 1906; the Business School was founded in 1937 by Gleason Leonard Archer.

== Academics ==
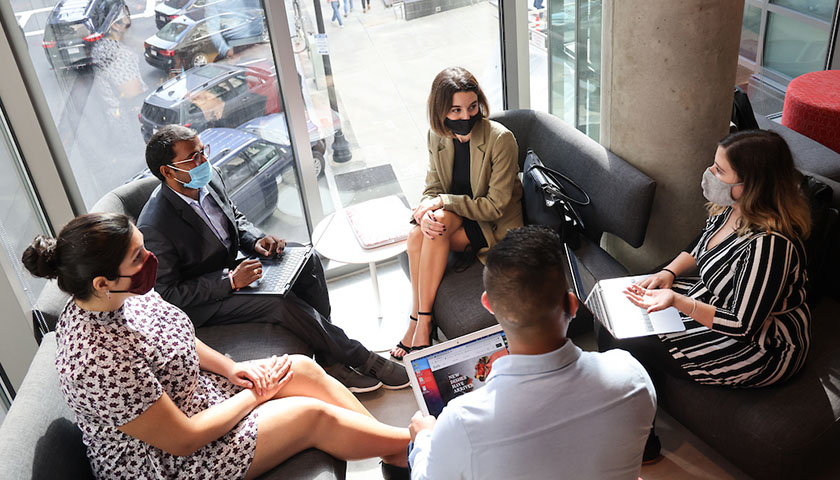
Students from Suffolk University's Sawyer Business School in the Samia Academic Center.

Sawyer Business School offers part-time and full-time undergraduate and graduate programs.

Undergraduate degrees are available in:

- Accounting
- Business Analytics
- Business Analytics & Information Systems
- Business Economics
- Corporate Accounting & Finance
- Entrepreneurship
- Finance
- Financial Wealth Management
- Global Business
- Information Systems
- Management
- Marketing

Starting in fall 2023, the School began offering a new Sports Management major, a keystone of which is a multi-year partnership signed with the Boston Celtics.

There are also dozens of minors and numerous concentrations.

At the graduate level the Business School offers:

- Master of Science in Accounting
- Master of Science in Business Analytics
- Master of Science in Finance
- Master of Science in Healthcare Administration
- Master of Science in Law: Life Sciences
- Master of Science in Management and Organizational Leadership
- Master of Science in Marketing
- MBA
- Executive MBA (EMBA)
- Master of Science in Public Administration

Students can also earn certificates or joint degrees among programs, as well as with the Suffolk University Law School.

== Rankings and accreditation ==
The Sawyer Business School is the only business school in the United States to obtain three accreditations from the leading international accreditation agencies in the areas of Business and Accounting, Healthcare Management (CAHME), and Public Administration.

Princeton Review ranked the Sawyer Business School MBA in its "Best Business Schools" list for 2023, and the online MBA in the Top 50 in the nation. They also ranked the school #6 for resources for women.

CEO Magazine has ranked the MBA as a global 'Tier 1' every year since 2017.

U.S. News & World Report ranked the MPA in the Top 100 Public Affairs programs in the nation for its 2023 rankings. The program has jumped 70 spots since 2017.

== See also ==
- Suffolk University
- Suffolk University Law School
- List of Suffolk University people
