= United States House Armed Services Subcommittee on Oversight and Investigations =

House Armed Services Subcommittee on Oversight and Investigations is a subcommittee of the House Armed Services Committee in the United States House of Representatives.

== Jurisdiction ==
The Oversight and Investigations Subcommittee has no legislative jurisdiction, but has responsibility of any matter within the Armed Services Committee's jurisdiction, subject to concurrence of the chairman of the full committee any chairmen of any affected subcommittees.

== Members, 115th Congress ==
Majority	Minority
Vicky Hartzler, Missouri, Chairwoman; Mike Conaway, Texas; Matt Gaetz, Florida; Jim Banks, Indiana; Liz Cheney, Wyoming; Austin Scott, Georgia	Seth Moulton, Massachusetts, Ranking Member; Tom O'Halleran, Arizona; Thomas Suozzi, New York
Ex officio
Mac Thornberry, Texas	Adam Smith, Washington
