= James Sokolove =

American attorney (born 1944)

- Born: October 4, 1944 (age 82)
- Education: Case Western Reserve University; Harvard University; Suffolk University
- Occupation: Attorney
- Organization: Sokolove Law LLC
- Known for: Personal injury law
- Website: sokolovelaw.com

James G. Sokolove (born October 4, 1944) is an American personal injury attorney known for building one of the first national personal injury law firms in the U.S. and pioneering the use of television advertising to connect injured individuals with legal representation. Although he retired in 2013, Sokolove Law continues to try cases.

The son of a personal injury lawyer, Sokolove was raised in Revere, Massachusetts. He received a B.A. from Case Western Reserve University in 1966 and a juris doctor from Suffolk University Law School in 1969. He was admitted to the Massachusetts Bar in 1969, to the U.S. District Court for the District of Massachusetts and the U.S. Court of Appeals for the First Circuit in 1970, and to the New York Bar in 1991. He also received a certificate in 1990 from Harvard Business School. When Sokolove's father was diagnosed with Parkinson's disease, he took his father's place leading the family law firm. After several years, the law firm dissolved, which led Sokolove to develop a new model for promoting legal services centered on television advertising. Sokolove's first ad, which featured a car crash filmed in slow motion, aired in 1982.

His advertising tactics were initially criticized by prominent Boston lawyers but proved successful. Overwhelmed by an influx of clients, he began referring clients to affiliated law firms for a portion of the legal fees they earned. The strategy was profitable enough that he told the Boston Business Journal in 1999 that by franchising his law firm he would "do for law what Staples did for office products." In 2009, Sokolove Law was referred to as "The Law Firm That Operates As An Ad Agency" by AdAge.

As of 2010, Sokolove's law office consisted of 80 employees and had over 300 affiliate firms in the United States. By 2011, his associates had surpassed $1 billion in fees from their operations in every U.S. state. The firm operates primarily through a network of affiliate attorneys, a model that gives it national reach.

He is known for the controversial style of his advertisements, which he describes as following a specific formula that boils down to "Injured? Free money." During the 1970s, Sokolove moved away from litigation and focused increasingly on managing and developing his personal injury practice. Sokolove is a supporter of the Democratic party, having donated over $250,000 in the past 10 years. During the 2008 presidential election, he participated in door-to-door canvassing on behalf of Barack Obama.

As of 2009, Sokolove's firm operated about 30 websites, including injury-related bulletin boards and forums for caregivers.

Sokolove retired from active practice at Sokolove Law in 2013, while the firm has continued to operate.

== Philanthropy ==
After law school, Sokolove served as a VISTA community organizer. In 1987, he launched Cycleline, a motorcycle safety education campaign, for which he received the 1988 Public Service Award from the Central Massachusetts Chapter of the National Safety Council. In 1989, he was awarded a certificate of merit by Students Against Drunk Driving, and in 1990 he established the James Sokolove Personal Best Awards and the Special Young Visions Art Competition, which for six years recognized achievements by young people with disabilities.

In 2008, Sokolove's charitable fund granted Stanford Law School's Center on the Legal Profession support for the Roadmap to Justice Project, aimed at expanding access to legal services for low- and middle-income individuals. The project brought together over one hundred experts in two forums (Boston, October 2008; Stanford, March 2009) and produced a 2012 white paper by Stanford law professor Deborah L. Rhode and Dmitry Bam.
