= Joan Vennochi =

American newspaper columnist (born 1953)

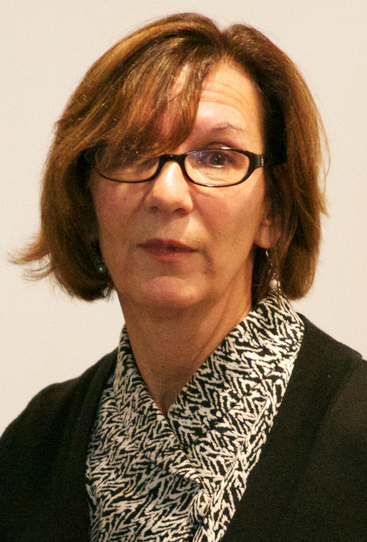
- Born: Joan Elizabeth Vennochi; January 27, 1953 (age 72); Brooklyn, New York
- Education: Boston University (BS); Suffolk University (JD)
- Occupation: Journalist

Joan Elizabeth Vennochi (born January 27, 1953) is an American newspaper columnist. She specializes in local and national politics at The Boston Globe. With Stephen A. Kurkjian, Alexander B. Hawes Jr., Nils Bruzelius, and Robert M. Porterfield she won the 1980 Pulitzer Prize for Local Investigative Specialized Reporting.

== Biography ==
Vennochi earned her BS degree from the Boston University College of Communication in 1975 and later earned her JD degree from the Suffolk University Law School, the latter institution where she is also a part-time faculty member and senior lecturer.

Vennochi works as a columnist for the Op-ed page for the Boston Globe. Previously she covered national and Massachusetts politics along with writing a business column.
