= Robert Munce =

Robert John Munce (1895–1975) served as the third president of Suffolk University in Boston, Massachusetts from 1954 to 1960.

Munce was born in Washington, Pennsylvania on January 25, 1895, to Robert John Munce, Sr. and Elizabeth M. Donley. Munce graduated from Washington and Jefferson College in 1918 and received an AM in 1926 from the University of Michigan. Munce became president of Suffolk University in 1954 and served until 1960.
