= Gleason Archer Jr. =

American Christian theologian (1916 – 2004)

- Born: May 22, 1916; Norwell, Massachusetts, U.S.
- Died: April 27, 2004 (aged 87); Sterling, Kansas, U.S.
- Spouses: Virginia Lillian (nee Atkinson) (m. 1939; died 1962) Sandra Paula (nee Larson)) (m. 1964; died 1999)
- Parent: Gleason Archer Sr. (father)

Academic background
- Education: Harvard University (BA, MA, PhD); Suffolk University (LLB); Princeton Theological Seminary (BDiv)
- Thesis: The Reception of Pindar in Germany during the Eighteenth Century (1944)

Academic work
- Discipline: Biblical studies
- Institutions: Fuller Theological Seminary; Trinity Evangelical Divinity School

Gleason Leonard Archer Jr. (May 22, 1916 – April 27, 2004) was an American biblical scholar, theologian, educator and author. He is notable for his work on well-known Bible translations and for his defense of biblical inerrancy.

== Early life and education ==
Gleason Archer was born in Norwell, Massachusetts, in 1916 and became a Christian at a young age through the influence of his mother, Elizabeth Archer. His maternal grandfather was a pastor. Archer's father was Gleason Archer Sr., the first president of Suffolk University and the founder of Suffolk Law School.

Archer was raised in Boston, Massachusetts. After graduating from Boston Latin School, he was educated at Harvard University, where he received a Bachelor of Arts, summa cum laude, in classics in 1938. He then received a Bachelor of Laws (LL.B.) from Suffolk Law School in 1939, the same year he was admitted to the Massachusetts Bar Association.

In 1940, Archer received a master's degree from Harvard and also earned a Ph.D. from the university in classics in 1944. In 1945, he received his Bachelor of Divinity (B.Div.) from Princeton Theological Seminary.

== Career ==
Archer served as an assistant pastor at Park Street Church in Boston from 1945 to 1948. He then was a professor of Biblical languages at Fuller Theological Seminary in Pasadena, California, from 1948 to 1965.

From 1965 to 1986, Archer served as a professor of Old Testament and semitics at Trinity Evangelical Divinity School in Deerfield, Illinois. He became an emeritus faculty member in 1989. The remainder of his life was spent researching, writing, and lecturing.

Archer served as one of the 50 original translators of the NASB published in 1971. He also worked on the team which translated the NIV Bible published in 1978. His defense of the doctrine of Biblical inerrancy by proposing harmonizations and exegesis regarding inconsistencies in the Bible made Archer a well known biblical inerrantist. He stated: "One cannot allow for error in history-science without also ending up with error in doctrine." He was critical of the documentary hypothesis which denies the Mosaic authorship of the Pentateuch. Archer also maintained that the prophet Isaiah wrote the entire book of Isaiah; he wrote regarding this issue: "There is not a shred of internal evidence to support the theory of a Second Isaiah, apart from a philosophical prejudice against the possibility of predictive prophecy."

In 1986 a Festschrift was published in his honor. A Tribute to Gleason Archer: Essays on the Old Testament included contributions from John J. Davis, Walter C. Kaiser, Meredith G. Kline, John H. Sailhamer, Bruce K. Waltke, Edwin M. Yamauchi, and Ronald F. Youngblood.

== Works ==
=== Books ===
- Archer Jr., Gleason Leonard (1944). The reception of Pindar in Germany during the eighteenth century (Ph. D.). Harvard University.
- ——— (1957). In the Shadow of the Cross. Grand Rapids, MI: Zondervan.
- ——— (1957). The Epistle to the Hebrews: A Study Manual. Grand Rapids, MI: Baker Book House.
- Jerome, Saint (1958). Jerome's commentary on Daniel. Translated by Archer, Gleason Leonard Jr. Grand Rapids, MI: Baker Book House.
- ——— (1959). The Epistle to the Romans: A Study Manual. Grand Rapids, MI: Baker Book House.
- ——— (1964). A Survey of Old Testament Introduction. Chicago, IL: Moody Press.
- ———; Harris, R. Laird; Waltke, Bruce K. (1980). Theological wordbook of the Old Testament. Chicago, IL: Moody Press. ISBN 0-8024-8631-2.
- ——— (1982). Encyclopedia of Bible Difficulties. Grand Rapids, MI: Zondervan. ISBN 0-310-43570-6.
- ——— (1983). The Book of Job: God's Answer to the Problem of Undeserved Suffering. Grand Rapids, MI: Baker Book House.
- ———; Chirichigno, Gregory (1983). Old Testament quotations in the New Testament. Chicago: Moody Press. ISBN 0-8024-0236-4.
- ——— (1986). A descriptive catalog of the Trinity Evangelical Divinity School Biblical coin collection. Deerfield, IL: Trinity Evangelical Divinity School.
- ———; Kaiser, Walter C.; Youngblood, Ronald F. (1986). A Tribute to Gleason Archer. Chicago, IL: Moody Pres. ISBN 0-8024-8780-7.
- ———; Hill, Gary (1987). The Discovery Bible. New American Standard, New Testament (Reference ed.). Chicago, IL: Moody Press. ISBN 0-8024-4159-9.
- ——— (1994). A Survey of Old Testament Introduction (Updated ed.). Chicago: Moody Press. ISBN 0-8024-8200-7.
- ———; Feinberg, Paul; Moo, Douglas (1996). Three Views on the Rapture. Grand Rapids, MI: Zondervan. ISBN 0-310-21298-7.
- ——— (2007). A Survey of Old Testament Introduction (Revised ed.). Chicago: Moody Press. ISBN 978-0-8024-8434-5.

== Reference works ==
- Robbins, David L. (1980). Gleason L. Archer. Suffolk University historical pamphlet series. Boston, MA: Suffolk University.
