= Gunnar S. Overstrom Jr. =

Gunnar S. Overstrom Jr. was a vice chairman of FleetBoston Financial (now a part of Bank of America) and the former president and chief operating officer of the Shawmut National Corporation. Mr. Overstrom graduated from Babson College in Wellesley, MA. He received an L.L.B. from Suffolk University Law School in Boston, MA in addition to a M.A. in Economics from Trinity College in Hartford, CT.

As a vice chairman of Fleet, Overstrom was instrumental in building the corporation's asset management portfolio and its brokerage and securities business. He spearheaded the acquisition of Quick and Reilly as well as the purchase of Columbia Asset Management.

As president and chief operating officer of Shawmut National, Overstrom helped lead the company in making over 50 acquisitions and building the company from a $2 billion regional bank to a $35 billion super-regional institution with offices in five states. In 1995, Shawmut National merged with the Fleet Financial Group.

After his work at Fleetboston, Mr. Overstrom joined Shawmut Capital Partners, a venture capital firm based in Boston, Massachusetts. In addition to his role as a partner at Shawmut Capital, Overstrom consulted and invested through his family's firm, Larus & Sons, and served on the boards of a number of public and private institutions.

Overstrom died on December 6, 2001, while travelling in Chicago. He was survived by his wife, Margery Larus Overstrom, and his two sons.
