= Suffolk University =

Private university in Boston, Massachusetts, US

- Former names: Archer's Evening Law School (1906–1907); Suffolk School of Law (1907–1937); Suffolk College of Arts and Sciences (1934–1937); College of Business Administration (1937)
- Motto: Honestas et Diligentia
- Motto in English: Honesty and Diligence
- Type: Private university
- Established: 1906 (120 years ago)
- Founder: Gleason L. Archer
- Accreditation: NEASC
- Endowment: $260.5 million (2025)
- President: Marisa Kelly
- Students: 6,403 (fall 2025)
- Undergraduates: 4,319 (fall 2025)
- Postgraduates: 2,078 (fall 2025)
- Location: Boston, Massachusetts, United States; 42°21′28″N 71°03′40″W
- Campus: 350 acres (140 ha); Urban
- Colors: Navy Blue and Gold
- Nickname: Rams
- Sporting affiliations: NCAA Division III; Commonwealth Coast Conference; Eastern College Athletic Conference
- Mascot: Hiram (Rammy) the Ram
- Website: Official Website

Suffolk University is a private university in Boston, Massachusetts, United States. With 7,560 students on all campuses, it is the tenth-largest university in metropolitan Boston. It was founded as a law school in 1906 and named after its location in Suffolk County, Massachusetts. The university is also host to its namesake public opinion poll, the Suffolk University Political Research Center.

The university, located at the downtown edge of the historic Beacon Hill neighborhood, comprises the Suffolk College of Arts and Sciences, Sawyer Business School, and Suffolk University Law School. The university's sports teams, the Suffolk Rams, compete in 19 varsity sports in NCAA Division III as members of the Commonwealth Coast Conference.

== History ==
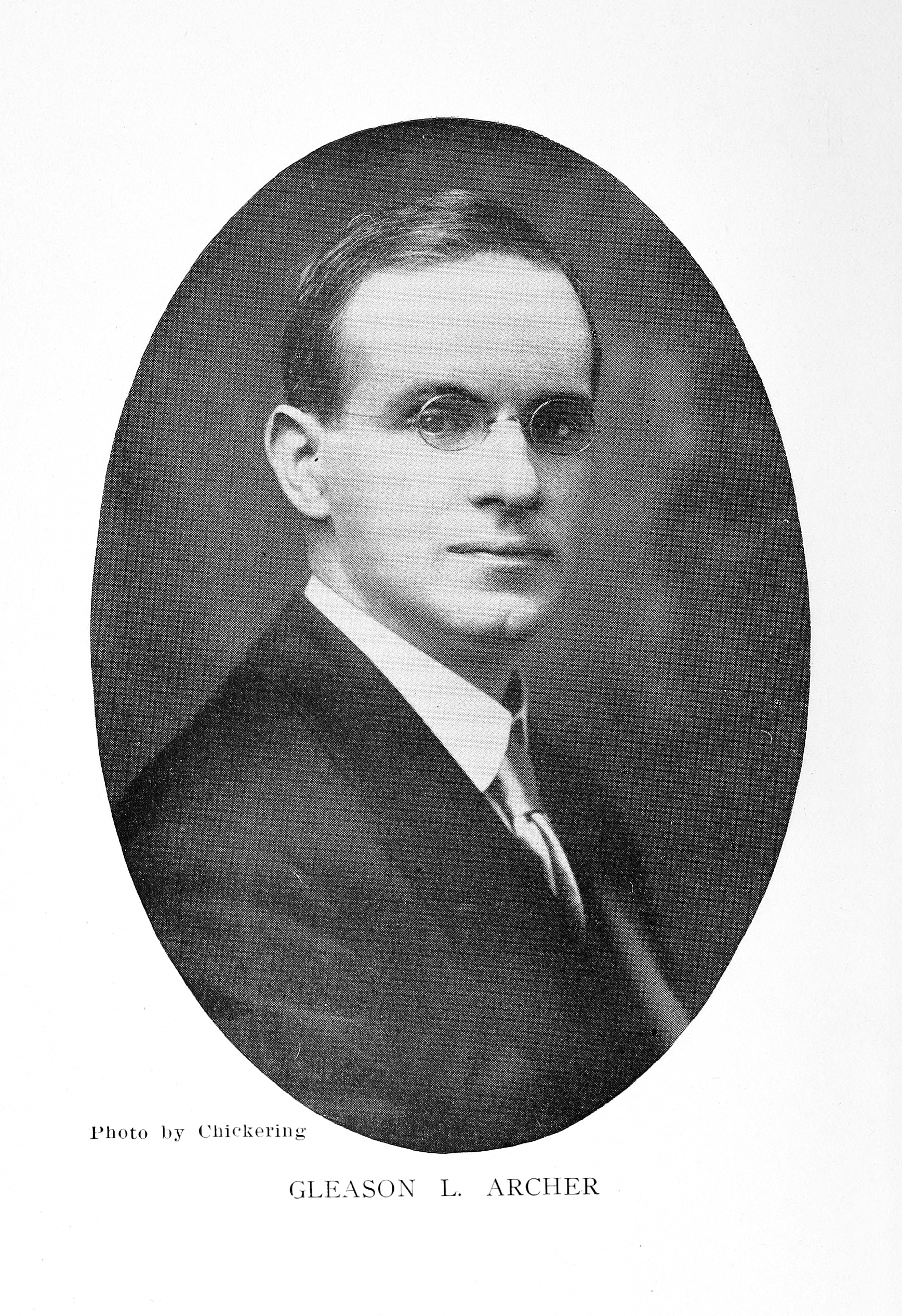
Suffolk University founder Gleason Archer Sr., c. 1915

Suffolk University was initially founded as a law school in 1906 by Boston lawyer Gleason Archer Sr., who named it "Archer's Evening Law School", intending it for law students who worked during the day. The school was renamed "Suffolk School of Law" in 1907, after Archer moved it from his Roxbury, Massachusetts home into his law offices in downtown Boston.

A year later the first of Archer's students had passed the bar, leading to a boost in registration. The school's original goal was to "serve ambitious young men who are obliged to work for a living while studying law."

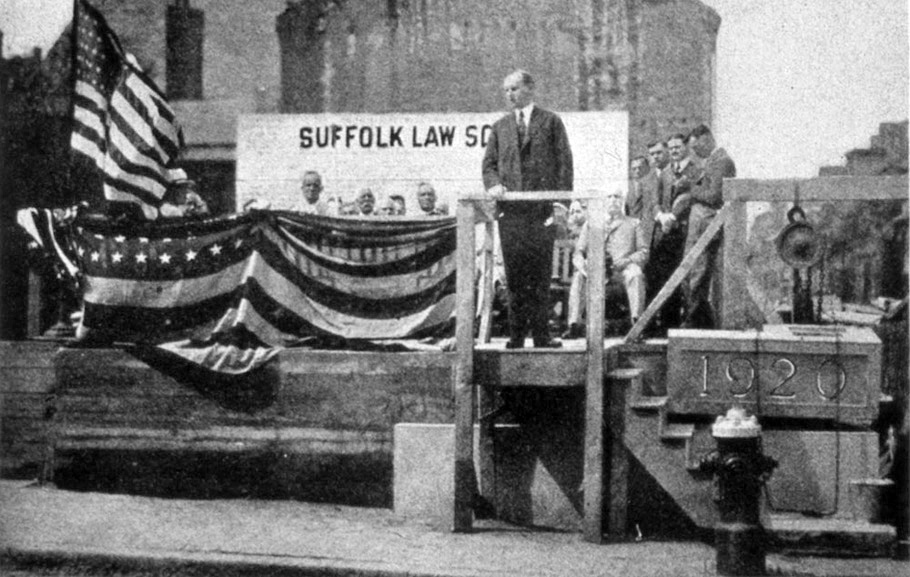
Calvin Coolidge, then Governor of Massachusetts and eventual 30th President of the United States, laying cornerstone for the law building, in 1920

By 1930, Archer developed Suffolk into one of the largest law schools in the country, and decided to create "a great evening university" that working people could afford.

The school became a university in the 1930s when the "Suffolk College of Arts and Sciences" was founded in 1934 and the Sawyer Business School—then known as the "College of Business Administration"—in 1937. That same year, the three academic units were incorporated as Suffolk University.

During the 1990s Suffolk constructed its first residence halls, began satellite programs with other colleges in Massachusetts, and opened its international campuses. From 1990 to 2005, its endowment increased over 400%, to approximately $72 million, and enrollment climbed.

=== Presidents ===
- Gleason Archer Sr. (1906–1948)
- Walter Burse (1948–1954)
- Robert Munce (1954–1960)
- Dennis C. Haley (1960–1965)
- John E. Fenton (1965–1970)
- Thomas Fulham (1970–1980)
- Daniel Perlman (1980–1989)
- David Sargent (1989–2010)
- Barry Brown (2010–2012) (interim)
- James McCarthy (2012–2014)
- Norman R. Smith (2014–2015) (interim)
- Margaret McKenna (2015–2016)
- Marisa Kelly (2016–present)

== Campus ==
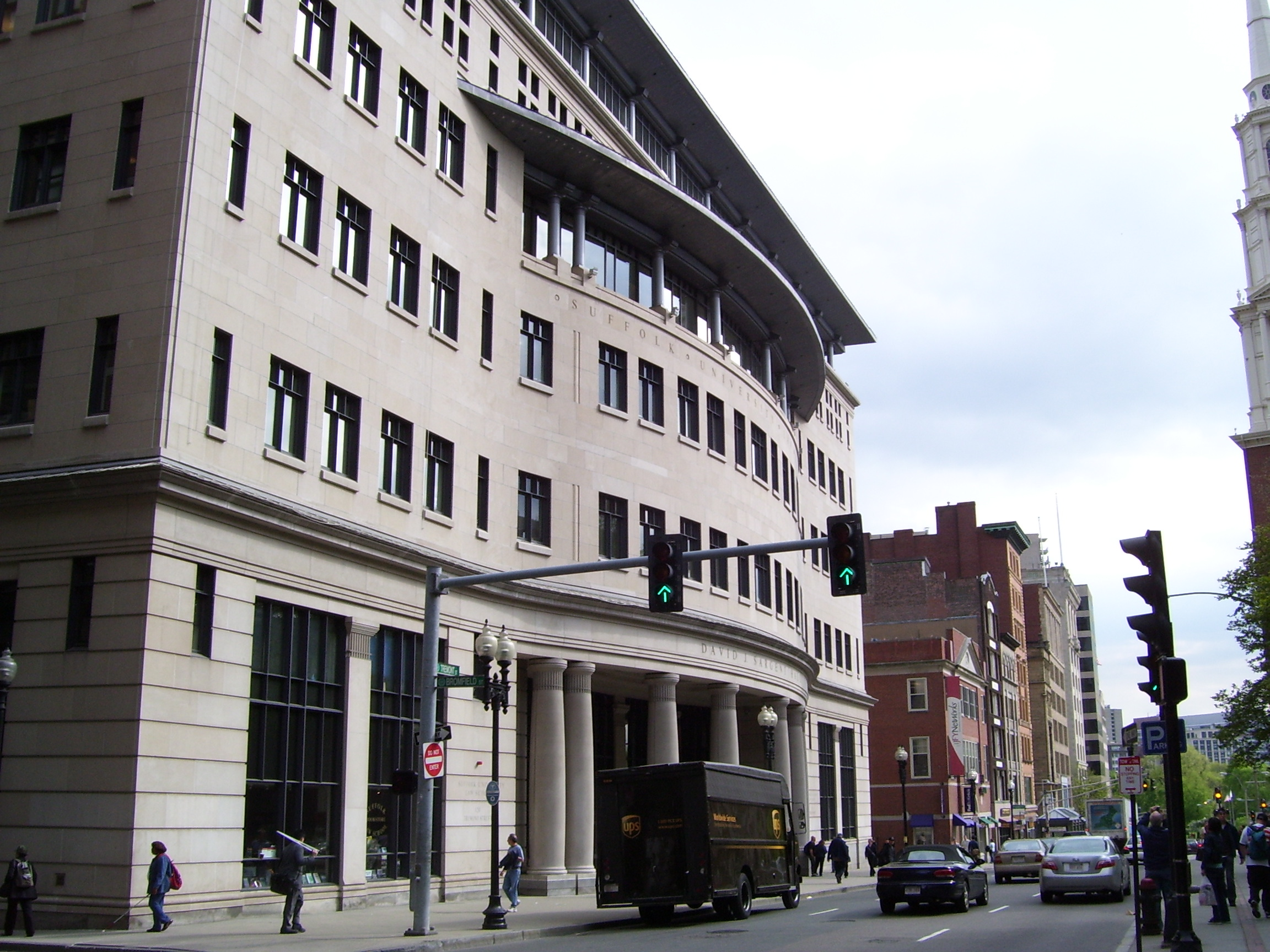
Sargent Hall

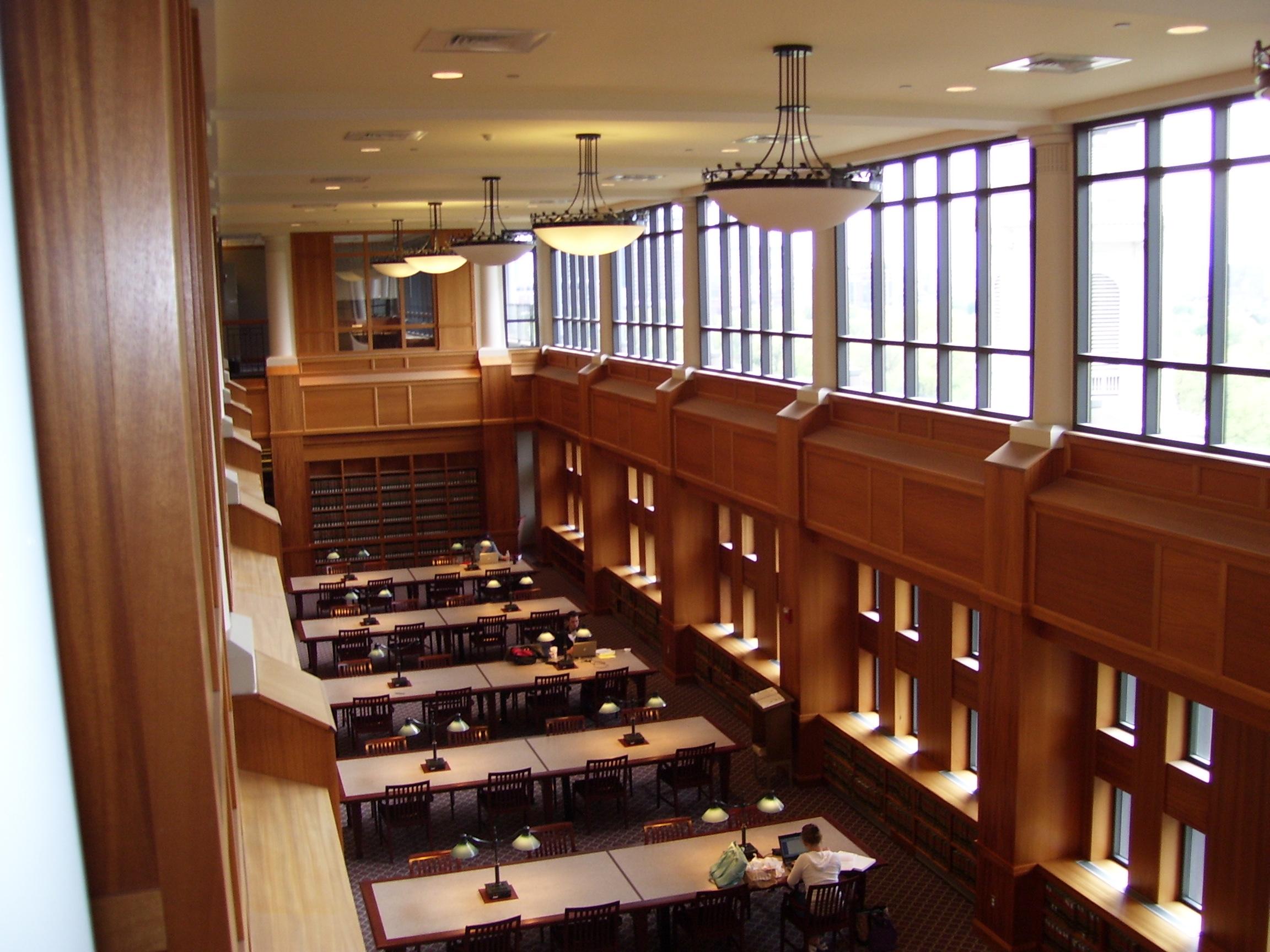
A Suffolk University Law Library reading room

The main campus in downtown Boston is situated on well-known Beacon Hill, adjacent to the Massachusetts State House and the Massachusetts Supreme Judicial Court. Up until 1995, Suffolk was a commuter-only school. Today, there are five coed residence halls, housing over 65% of freshman, and a total of 24% of the entire undergraduate population:

- Smith Hall
- Nathan R. Miller Hall
- 10 West
- Modern Theatre
- One Court Street

The residence hall at 150 Tremont Street, renamed Smith Hall in 2018, was the first built by the university and currently houses students in singles, doubles, quads, and suites, with communal bathrooms.

Nathan R. Miller Residence Hall (located at 10 Somerset St.) was opened in 2005 and houses 15 floors of freshman, and 2 floors of sophomores in singles, doubles and quads, with bathrooms shared between every two rooms or one bathroom per quad.

The 10 West Residence Hall, opened in 2008, has housing for freshman and sophomores in singles and doubles. Suites accommodate 3–5 students and a variety of apartment-style suites (that include full kitchens) house 2 to 8 students.

Both Miller Hall and 150 Tremont have cafeterias. Students living at 10 West/Modern Theater can eat at 150 Tremont. Suffolk University occasionally leases additional properties (such as the Hyatt & Holiday Inn Beacon Hill). If leased, those locations house freshman students.

The Modern Theatre Residence Hall opened in the fall of 2010 and is considered an extension to the 10 West Resident Hall. The two residence halls share one entrance at 10 West Street. The Modern Theater Residence Hall is built over the restored Modern Theatre (Boston).

In the fall of 2020, the university added a new residence hall, the Ames Building at One Court Street, which it purchased in the fall of 2019.

On June 26, 2024, Suffolk University announced plans for a sixth residence hall after the purchase of a new property. President Marisa Kelly said that 101 Tremont Street across from Granary Burial Ground will be converted to an 11-story residence hall following their pending permit and review process of the city of Boston.

== Academics ==
Suffolk employs over 900 full-time and adjunct faculty members, who instruct approximately 10,000 undergraduate and graduate students on its Boston Campus.

The Sawyer Business School (previously the Sawyer School of Management) focuses on global business education. It offers undergraduate and graduate degrees. Joint degrees are also offered. About 3,000 students are currently enrolled in all programs. The Saturday-only Executive MBA Program incorporates four off-site one-week seminars and week-long global trips to Madrid and China. The Global MBA is a specialized MBA in international business with an intensive concentration in either finance or marketing. The full-time program includes a 3-month internship outside the student's home country. Summer 2010 Global MBA internships are in 10 countries. Part-time Global MBAs complete either a global experiential research project at their place of business or a 3-month consulting project that includes an intensive 2 week residency outside the US.

The Suffolk College of Arts and Sciences has seventeen academic departments which offer more than seventy undergraduate and graduate programs. Among the departments is the New England School of Art and Design (NESAD)

Suffolk University Law School, founded in 1906, offers a standard Juris Doctor program and advanced L.L.M. program. 43% of applicants were admitted to the J.D. program in 2005.

The university is also home to various research centers and institutes, including the Centers for Crime & Justice Policy Research, Restorative Justice, and Women's Health and Human Right, the Moakley Archives, the Poetry Center, Political Research Centers, and the Sagan Energy Research Laboratory. The Suffolk University Political Research Center (SUPRC) conducts various scientific polls of national and regional political issues.

The university also has an undergraduate honors program in the College of Arts & Sciences and Sawyer Business School. Freshman and transfer students are considered for the Honors program upon applying to Suffolk. Students in their second year are considered candidates for the program by remaining one year at the institution with a 3.5 GPA.

== Reputation and rankings ==
In 2018, U.S. News ranked Suffolk #177 (tie) in National Universities.

== Athletics ==
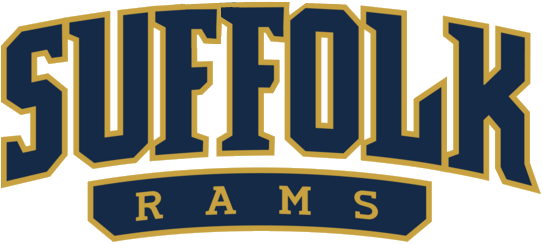
Suffolk Rams wordmark

Suffolk University teams, nicknamed the Rams, participate as a member of the National Collegiate Athletic Association's Division III. The Rams are a member of the Conference of New England and the Eastern College Athletic Conference (ECAC). They were a member of the Great Northeast Athletic Conference (GNAC) from 1995 to 2020.

Men's sports include baseball, basketball, cross country, indoor and outdoor track and field, golf, ice hockey, soccer and tennis; while women's sports include basketball, cross country, indoor and outdoor track and field, ice hockey, soccer, softball, golf, tennis and volleyball.

== Student newspaper ==
The Suffolk Journal is the weekly student newspaper of Suffolk University. It has operated continuously since 1936. The Journal prints a 16-page weekly newspaper, distributed across campus.

== Notable persons ==
=== Notable alumni ===
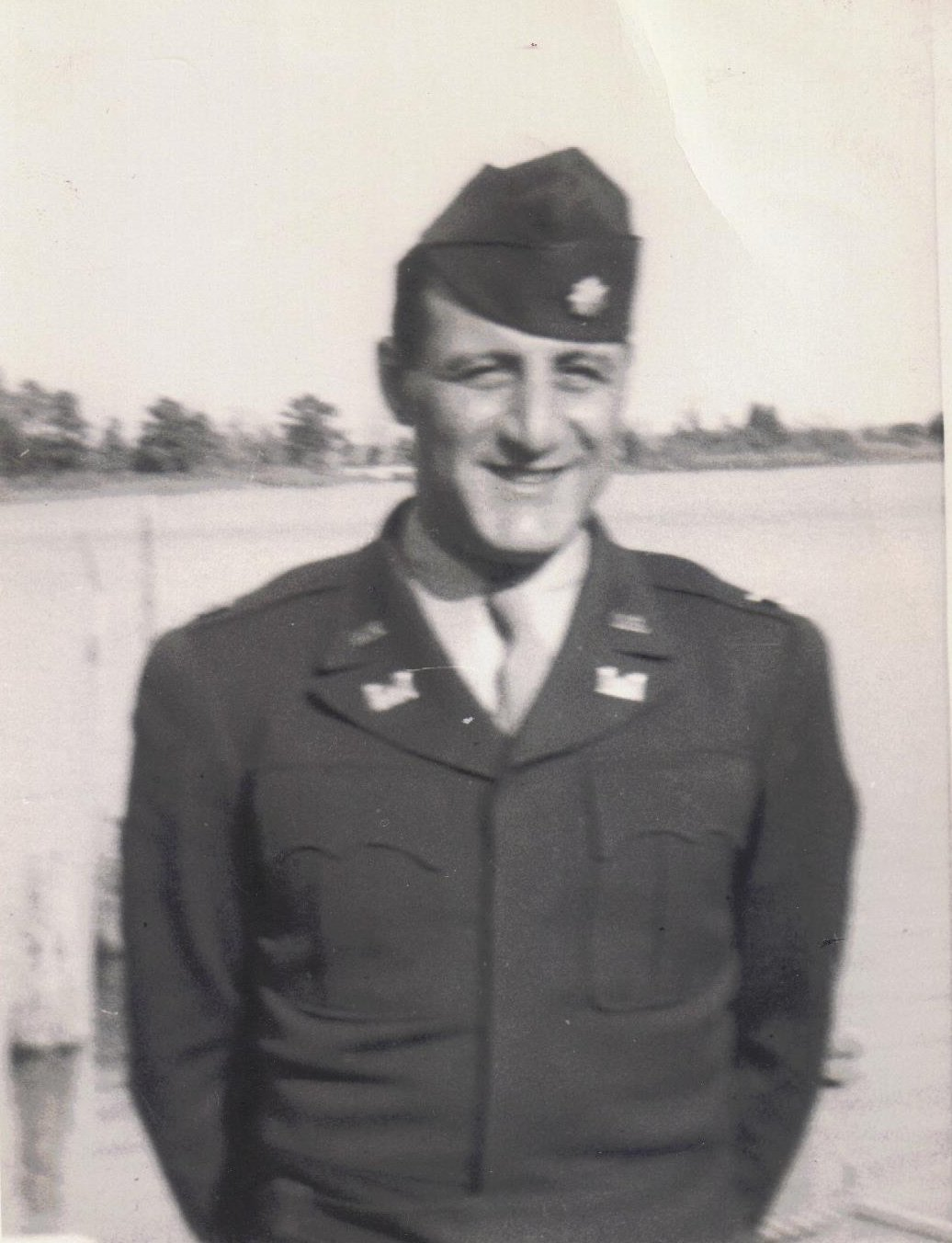
William L. Uanna, class of 1942, officer at the Central Intelligence Agency, Counter Intelligence Corps (CIC) as Director of Operations of the I Service Command, security expert on the Manhattan Project

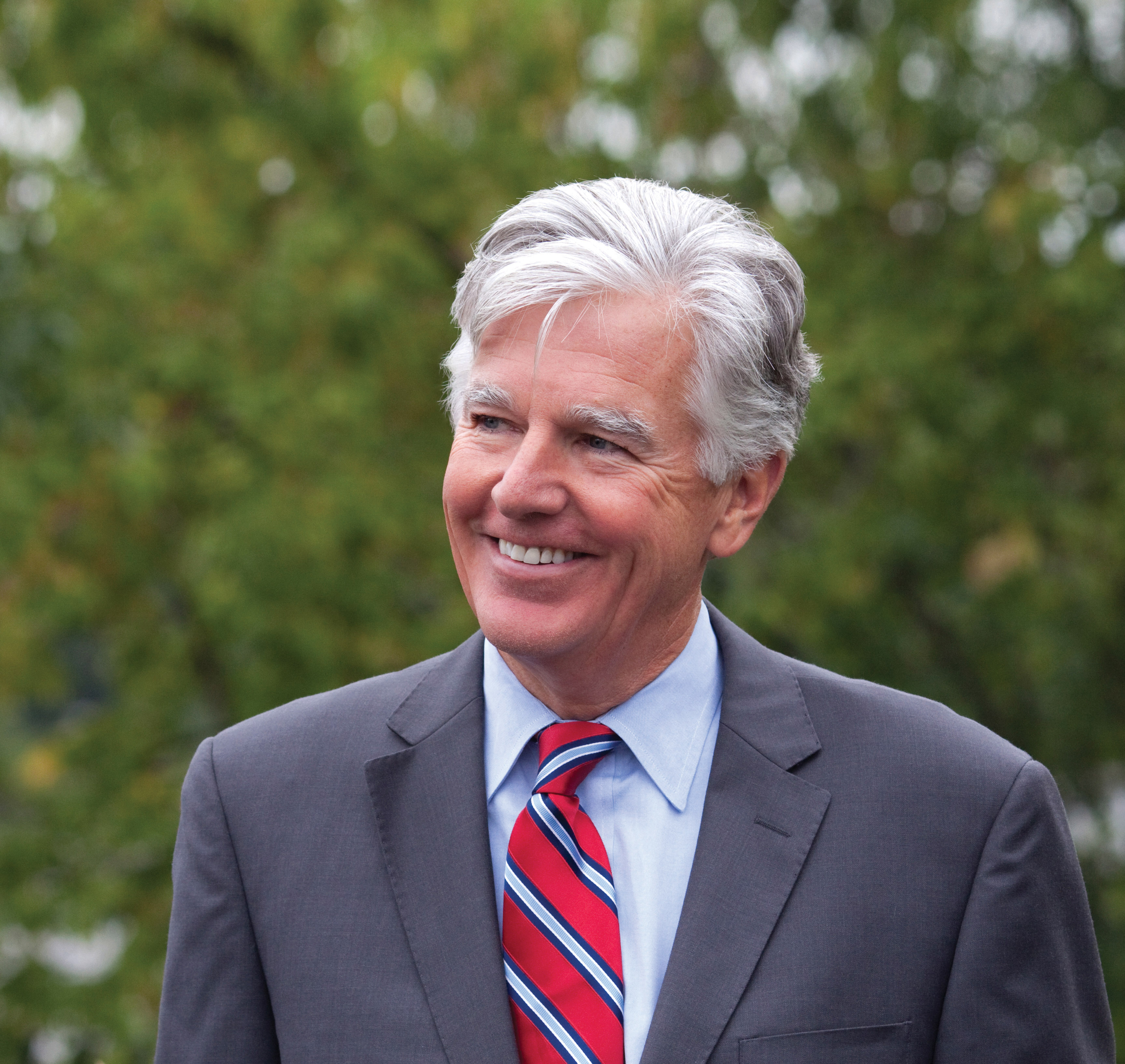
Martin Meehan, class of 1981, U.S. representative from Massachusetts 1993–2007, former chairman United States House Armed Services Subcommittee on Oversight and Investigations, current president of the University of Massachusetts

- Paul Benedict, Broadway actor (Hughie, The Music Man), director, television and actor (Bentley on The Jeffersons, The Goodbye Girl, Sesame Street, This is Spinal Tap, Waiting for Guffman, A Mighty Wind)
- Eliza Dushku, actor (Buffy the Vampire Slayer, Bull), activist
- Garreth Lynch, member of the Massachusetts House of Representatives
- John Hynes, class of 1924, 49th mayor of Boston
- Thomas J. Lane, class of 1925, U.S. representative from Massachusetts (1941–1963)
- James A. Burke, U.S. representative from Massachusetts (1959–1979)
- Gleason Archer Jr., class of 1939, theologian, author
- William L. Uanna, class of 1942, officer at the Central Intelligence Agency from 1949 to 1951, Counter Intelligence Corps (CIC) as Director of Operations of the I Service Command, security expert on the Manhattan Project
- Martin F. Loughlin, class of 1951, U.S. District Court of New Hampshire, judge (1979–1995)
- Thomas Michael McGovern, college president
- David Sargent, class of 1954, president of Suffolk University (1989–2010)
- Joe Moakley, class of 1956, U.S. representative from Massachusetts 1973–2001, chairman of the U.S. House Committee on Rules
- Judge Frank Caprio, class of 1965, television judge Caught in Providence on ABC; Chief Judge Providence, R.I. Municipal Court
- Gunnar S. Overstrom Jr., class of 1968, vice-chair of Fleet Boston and president and chief operating officer of the Shawmut National Corporation.
- James Sokolove, class of 1969, television personal injury attorney
- Robert L. Caret, class of 1969, Chancellor of University System of Maryland
- Richard J. Leon, class of 1974, U.S. District Court of the District of Columbia, judge (2002–present)
- Paul Reiber, class of 1974, Chief Justice of the Vermont Supreme Court
- James Bamford, class of 1975, journalist, author
- Francis Flaherty, class of 1975, Justice of Rhode Island Supreme Court
- William F. Galvin, class of 1975, Secretary of State of Massachusetts
- Dan Harrington, poker player, winner of 1995 World Series of Poker, member of Poker Hall of Fame
- Robert A. DeLeo, class of 1976, member of the Mass. House of Representatives (served 1991 – present) 85th Speaker of the Massachusetts House of Representatives
- Jerald G. Fishman, class of 1976, president & CEO, Analog Devices
- John F. Tierney, class of 1976, U.S. Representative from Massachusetts 1997–2015, former chairman of the Subcommittee on National Security and Foreign Affairs
- Paul Suttell, class of 1976, Justice of Rhode Island Supreme Court
- John Loftus, class of 1977, author, television commentator
- Maureen Goldberg, class of 1978, Justice of Rhode Island Supreme Court
- Ronald Machtley, class of 1978, president of Bryant University, U.S. Representative from Rhode Island (1989–1995)
- Michael E. Festa, class of 1979, member of the Mass. House of Representatives (served 1998–present)
- Nina Mitchell Wells, Secretary of State of New Jersey, 2006–present
- Martin Meehan, class of 1981, U.S. representative from Massachusetts 1993–2007, former chairman United States House Armed Services Subcommittee on Oversight and Investigations, current president of the University of Massachusetts
- Joan Vennochi, class of 1984, Pulitzer Prize winner, investigative journalist, The Boston Globe
- Cheryl Jacques, class of 1987, legislator, president of the Human Rights Campaign
- Edward M. Augustus Jr., class of 1987, city manager for Worcester, Massachusetts
- Patrick C. Lynch, class of 1992, Attorney General of Rhode Island
- Gary Christenson, class of 1990, 1992, and 2003 (triple alumnus), mayor of Malden, Massachusetts
- Allan Fung, Class of 1995, Mayor of Cranston, Rhode Island
- George Sifakis, Class of 2000, Director of the White House Office of Public Liaison
- Jenna Mourey (Jenna Marbles), class of 2008, YouTube personality
- Michelle Leonardo, class of 2013, Miss New Jersey USA 2012, Miss New Jersey Teen USA 2008 and Top 10 at Miss USA 2012
- Nick Cafardo, Boston Globe sports reporter and columnist, 2017 Massachusetts Sports Writer of the Year and 2017 recipient of the Boston Baseball Writers' Association of America's Dave O'Hara award.
- Hridayendra Shah, former Crown Prince of Nepal and current master's student
- Katjana Ballantyne, 36th mayor of Somerville, Massachusetts

=== Notable faculty and trustees ===
- Patricia Brown, emeritus law librarian and professor
- Joseph Glannon, professor, well-known writer of Torts and Civil Procedure texts
- Joseph P. Hoar, trustee, Commander in Chief of U.S. Central Command
- Tom "Clack" Magliozzi, professor of business and co-host of Car Talk
- Gerald Peary, professor of communications, noted film critic, reviewer, and columnist
- Susan Starr Sered, senior research associate at Suffolk University's Center for Women's Health and Human Rights, author of books on women's health
- Ronald Suleski
