= Thomas Fulham =

Thomas A. Fulham (July 18, 1915 – March 30, 1995) was an American businessman and the president of Suffolk University in Boston, Massachusetts from 1970 to 1980.

== Life ==
Thomas Fulham was born in 1915 in Winthrop, Massachusetts. Fulham graduated from St. John's Preparatory School and College of the Holy Cross in Worcester, Massachusetts in 1937. He served in the Army during World War II. After the War, Fulham entered the family fish business and served as president of the Boston Fish Market Corporation starting in 1953. He pioneered fish sticks in the 1950s. Fulham was elected as president of Suffolk University in 1970 and served until 1980. He received an honorary doctorate from Northeastern University in 1980. Fulham died in Natick, Massachusetts in 1995 at age 79. The Thomas A. Fulham Merit Scholarship is named in his honor.
