= Daniel Perlman =

Daniel H. Perlman (1934–1994) was the seventh president of Suffolk University in Boston, Massachusetts, from 1980 to 1989 and president of Webster University from 1990 to 1994.

Perlman received two A.B. degrees, one from Shimer College in 1954 and one from the University of Chicago in 1955. He received his A.M. in 1956, and Ph.D. in 1971, both from the University of Chicago.

From 1972 to 1980, Perlman worked at Roosevelt University in Chicago. In 1980, he became president of Suffolk University in Boston and served in that position until 1989. After leaving Suffolk University, Perlman was president-in-residence at Harvard University's Institute for Educational Management for a year.

Perlman became president of Webster University in 1990, serving until ill health forced him to take a leave of absence in 1993. Perlman died on March 31, 1994, in St. Louis from cancer at age 59.
