= James McCarthy (sociologist) =

American sociologist (born c.1949)

James F. McCarthy (born c. 1949) is an American sociologist who was the president of Suffolk University in Boston, Massachusetts, from 2012 to 2014.

== Early life and education ==
McCarthy was born and raised in Waterbury, Connecticut, to Irish American parents. He has two sisters, Mary and Patricia, both of whom became nuns. He also has a younger brother, Tom, who became a stockbroker. His father, John McCarthy, was a clerk, and his mother, Mary Flaherty, was a brass factory worker; both were first-generation Irish immigrants. All four of his grandparents were immigrants from County Kerry, Ireland.

After attending Sacred Heart High School, McCarthy graduated from the College of the Holy Cross in Worcester, Massachusetts, with a Bachelor of Arts in sociology in 1971. He then earned a Master of Arts in sociology from Indiana University in 1972 and his Ph.D. in sociology from Princeton University in 1977. His doctoral dissertation at Princeton was titled, "Patterns of marriage dissolution in the United States."

== Career ==
McCarthy served as a professor and dean of the School of Health and Human Services at the University of New Hampshire, and has taught courses in public health and sociology at Columbia University and the Johns Hopkins University. His academic expertise is demography and adolescent and reproductive health. From 2007 to 2012 McCarthy served as provost and senior vice president for academic affairs at the City University of New York's Baruch College, McCarthy was selected as the president of Suffolk University in 2012.
