= Garreth Lynch =

American politician (1943–2026)

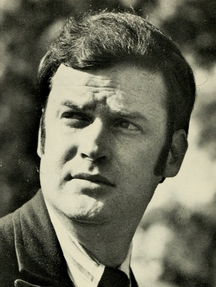
- Lynch in 1975

Member of the Massachusetts House of Representatives from the 6th Hampden district
- In office 1973–1978

Personal details
- Born: Garreth James Lynch; March 13, 1943 Portsmouth, New Hampshire, U.S.
- Died: August 9, 2026 (aged 83)
- Party: Democratic
- Spouse: Cheryl Houghton
- Education: Westfield State University; Suffolk University; University at Albany

Garreth James Lynch (March 13, 1943 – August 9, 2026) was an American politician. A member of the Democratic Party, he served in the Massachusetts House of Representatives from 1973 to 1978.

== Early life and career ==
Lynch was born in Portsmouth, New Hampshire, on March 13, 1943, the son of James Lynch and Anne Mara. He attended Assumption Preparatory High School and the College of the Holy Cross. He earned his bachelor's degree at Westfield State University. He also earned his master's degree at Suffolk University, and earned his doctorate at the University at Albany. After earning his degrees, he worked as a English teacher at Westfield High School.

He served in the Massachusetts House of Representatives from 1973 to 1978.

== Personal life and death ==
Lynch was married to Cheryl Houghton. Their marriage lasted until Lynch's death in 2026.

Lynch died on August 9, 2026, at the age of 83.
