= Marisa Kelly =

American political scientist

President of Suffolk University
- Incumbent
- Assumed office 2018

Personal details
- Education: California State University, Sacramento (B.A.); San Francisco State University (M.A.); University of Kansas (Ph.D)

Marisa Kelly is an American political scientist and academic administrator who is the current president of Suffolk University in Boston, Massachusetts.

Kelly received a B.A. in Government from California State University, Sacramento in 1986 and an MA in Political Theory from San Francisco State University. She then earned a PhD in Political Science from the University of Kansas in 1994.

From 1994 to 2006 Kelly was a faculty member and administrator at University of the Pacific in Stockton, California. She then worked as dean and McQuinn Distinguished Chair of the College of Arts and Sciences at the University of St. Thomas (Minnesota) from 2006 to 2011. Kelly was provost and vice president at Ithaca College from 2011 to 2014, and joined Suffolk as provost in 2014. She was interim president of Suffolk University before being appointed president in 2018.
