= Barry Brown (attorney) =

American lawyer

Barry Brown was the eighth president of Mount Ida College in Newton, Massachusetts. Brown is also a law professor, author, and a former provost at Suffolk University Law School. He previously served as interim president of Suffolk University in Boston, Massachusetts from 2010 to 2012.

Brown received his A.B. in 1968 at Harvard College, Ed.M. in 1969 at the Harvard Graduate School of Education, and J.D. in 1972 at Harvard Law School. He was admitted to the Massachusetts bar in 1973. He was Assistant Bar Counsel of the Massachusetts Board of Bar Overseers from 1974 to 1976. From 1983 to 1984 Brown served as a visiting scholar at Harvard. Brown has written about Bioethics, Land Transfer & Finance, Real Property and the Legal Profession. Barry Brown joined the Suffolk University Law School faculty in 1976 and became a tenured professor of law in 1978. He was named provost of Suffolk in August 2008. Brown served as acting president of Suffolk University from October 2010 through January 2012. He was appointed president of Mount Ida in July 2012.

Brown's presidency of Mount Ida College ended in 2018 when the school officially closed in May. The Massachusetts Attorney General's office approved Mount Ida's merger with UMass.

== Works by Brown ==
Books

- Massachusetts Condominium Law (1st ed. 1990 & 2d ed., 1992) (with Bernard Keenan, and Douglas MacGregor)

Articles

- "Human Cloning and Genetic Engineering: The Case for Proceeding Cautiously," 65 ALBANY L. REV. 649 (2002)
- "The Case for Caution—Being Protective of Human Dignity in the Face of Corporate Forces Taking Title to our DNA," 29 J. J. MED. & ETHICS 166 (2001)
- "The Old Chestnut Explored: Thoughts on the Survival of Casner’s Cases and Text on Property Long Past Its Prime," 22 SEATTLE U. L. REV. 947 (1999)
- "Reconciling Property Law with Advances in Reproductive Science," 6 STANFORD L. & POL'Y REV. 73 (1995)
- "Genetic Testing, Access to Genetic Data, and Discrimination: Conceptual Legislative Models," 27 SUFFOLK U. L. REV. 1573 (1993)
- "Preface," 27 SUFFOLK U. L. REV. 1169 (1993)
