= Jerald G. Fishman =

American electrical engineer and businessman (1945–2013)

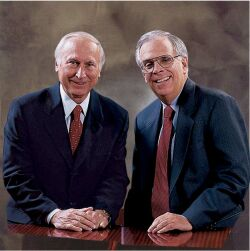
Ray Stata (Left) and Jerry Fishman (right)

Jerald G. Fishman (1945 - March 28, 2013) was an American electrical engineer and businessman. He was Chief Executive Officer and President of Analog Devices since November 1996 until his death in March 2013. He was a 35-year veteran of Analog Devices and was on the Board of Directors of Analog Devices, Cognex Corporation and Xilinx Inc.

== Personal and education ==
Fishman grew up in Flushing, New York, and graduated from the Bronx High School of Science. He was granted both Bachelor of Science and Master of Science degrees in Electrical Engineering from City College of New York and Northeastern University, respectively, as well as an MBA from the Boston University Graduate School of Management and a Juris Doctor from Suffolk University Law School.

== Career ==
Shortly after receiving his master's degree from Northeastern University in 1970, Fishman joined the product marketing team at Analog Devices in 1971. Over the next few years he held a number of positions in management and eventually ended up as the General Manager of Analog Devices' Semiconductor division in 1979. During these years, Fishman also completed and received an MBA from Boston University in 1972 and JD from Suffolk University Law School in 1976.

In 1980, Fishman was elected vice president and then again in 1988 as executive vice president. In 1991, he was elected as president and chief operating officer and in 1996, he was elected as president and chief executive officer.

In 2004, Fishman was named "CEO of the Year" by Electronics Business magazine.

Fishman was on the board of trustees of the Lahey Clinic.

== Death ==
Fishman died on March 28, 2013, of an apparent heart attack at age 67.
