= David Sargent =

American lawyer and academic administrator (1931–2026)

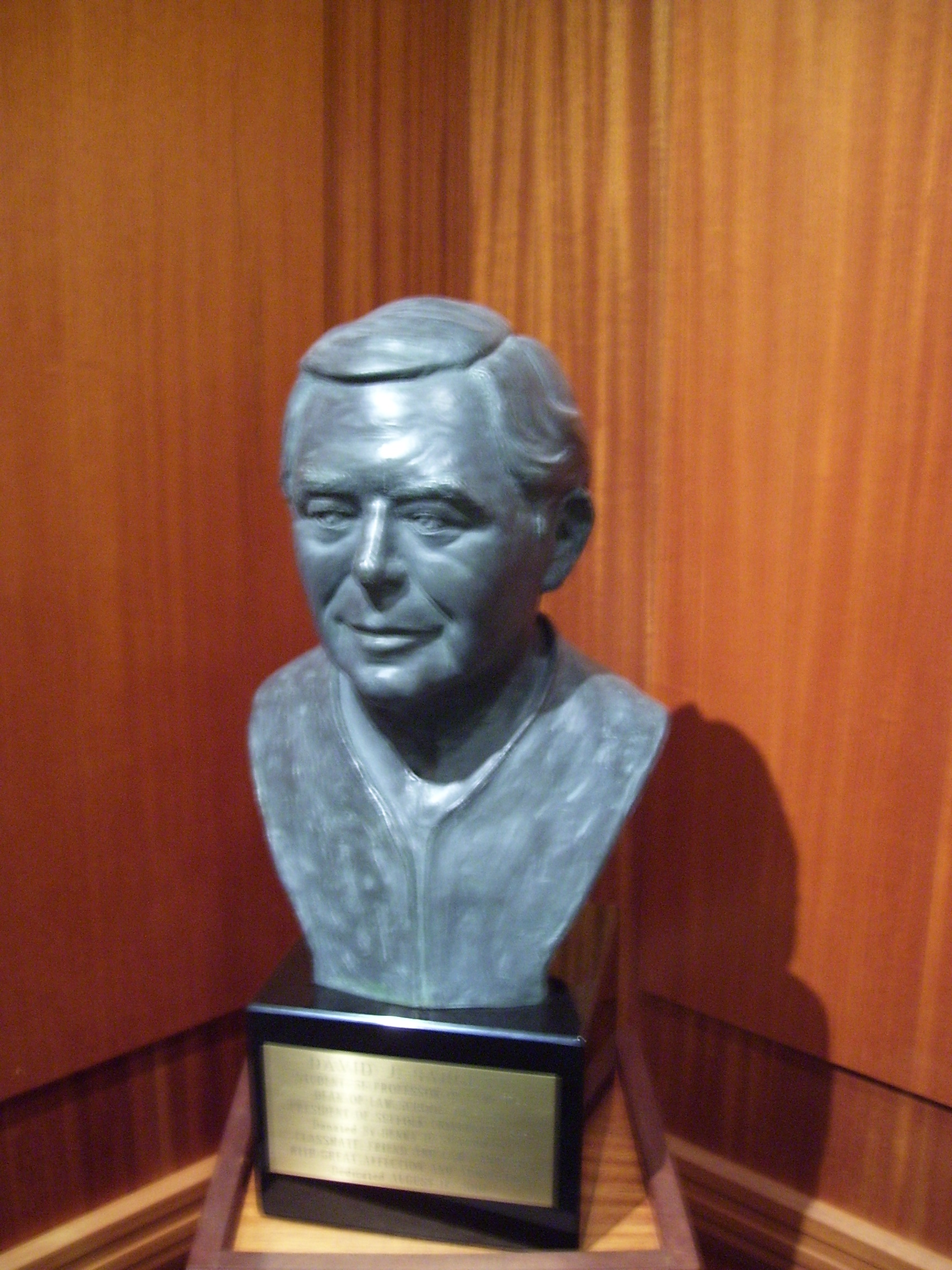
Bust of Sargent at Suffolk Law School

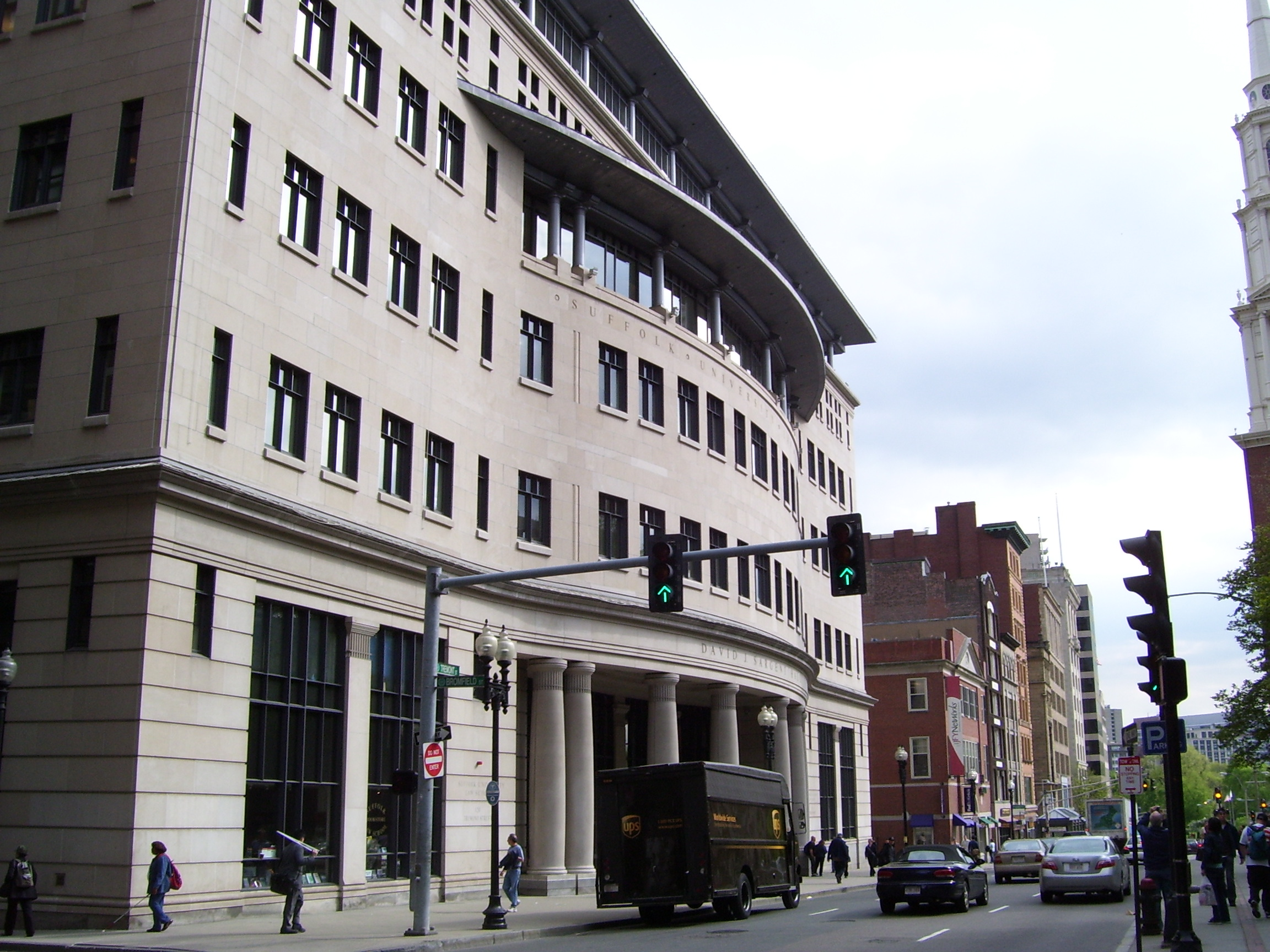
Sargent Hall, the main building at Suffolk Law School

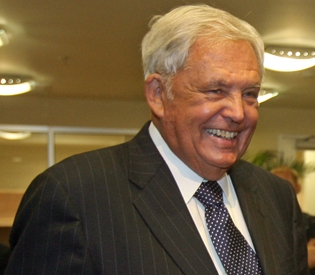
David J. Sargent

David J. Sargent (August 5, 1931 – September 27, 2026) was an American lawyer and academic administrator who served as the eighth president of Suffolk University in Boston, Massachusetts, from 1989 to 2010, overseeing significant institutional growth and expansion during his tenure.

== Life and career ==
David J. Sargent was born in Newport, New Hampshire on August 5, 1931. A 1954 graduate of Suffolk University Law School magna cum laude in 1954, Sargent was ranked number one and president of his class. He was admitted to the bar in Massachusetts and New Hampshire that same year. Sargent began his association with the institution shortly after completing his legal education, joining as a professor of law in 1956.

He advanced to become dean of the Suffolk University Law School in 1972, a position he held until 1989, during which he contributed to the school's accreditation and development as a key part of the university. Under his deanship and subsequent presidency, Suffolk evolved from a primarily commuter-based institution serving local students into a major urban university with nearly 10,000 students from over 110 countries, introducing doctoral programs, international campuses in Madrid, Spain, and Dakar, Senegal, and incorporating the New England School of Art & Design.

Key infrastructure achievements during his leadership included the construction of four new residence halls, a dedicated law school building now named David J. Sargent Hall, an administrative facility housing the Mildred Sawyer Library, and the restoration of the Modern Theatre as a performance space. Sargent's presidency also emphasized research and public service, with the establishment of centers such as the Center for Global Business Law and Ethics, the Rappaport Center for Law and Public Service, the John Joseph Moakley Institute on Public Policy and Political Leadership, and the Suffolk University Political Research Center. The faculty composition improved markedly, reaching 91% with Ph.D. degrees by the end of his term, alongside a 1:12 undergraduate faculty-to-student ratio, and the alumni network expanded to over 60,000 members.

His long service—spanning over five decades—earned him recognition, including the American Trial Lawyers Association Award for service to the bar and public, the John Joseph Moakley Public Service Award, and an honorary doctor of laws from Suffolk University. In 2008, Sargent was reported as the highest-compensated college president in the United States, with total compensation exceeding $2.8 million that year.

When Sargent retired in October 2010 at age 79 the Board of Trustees conferred upon him the title of President Emeritus in acknowledgment of his many contributions. Throughout his career, he remained committed to Suffolk's founding mission of providing accessible education to diverse students from varied backgrounds.

Sargent died on September 27, 2026, at the age of 95.
