= Gleason Archer Sr. =

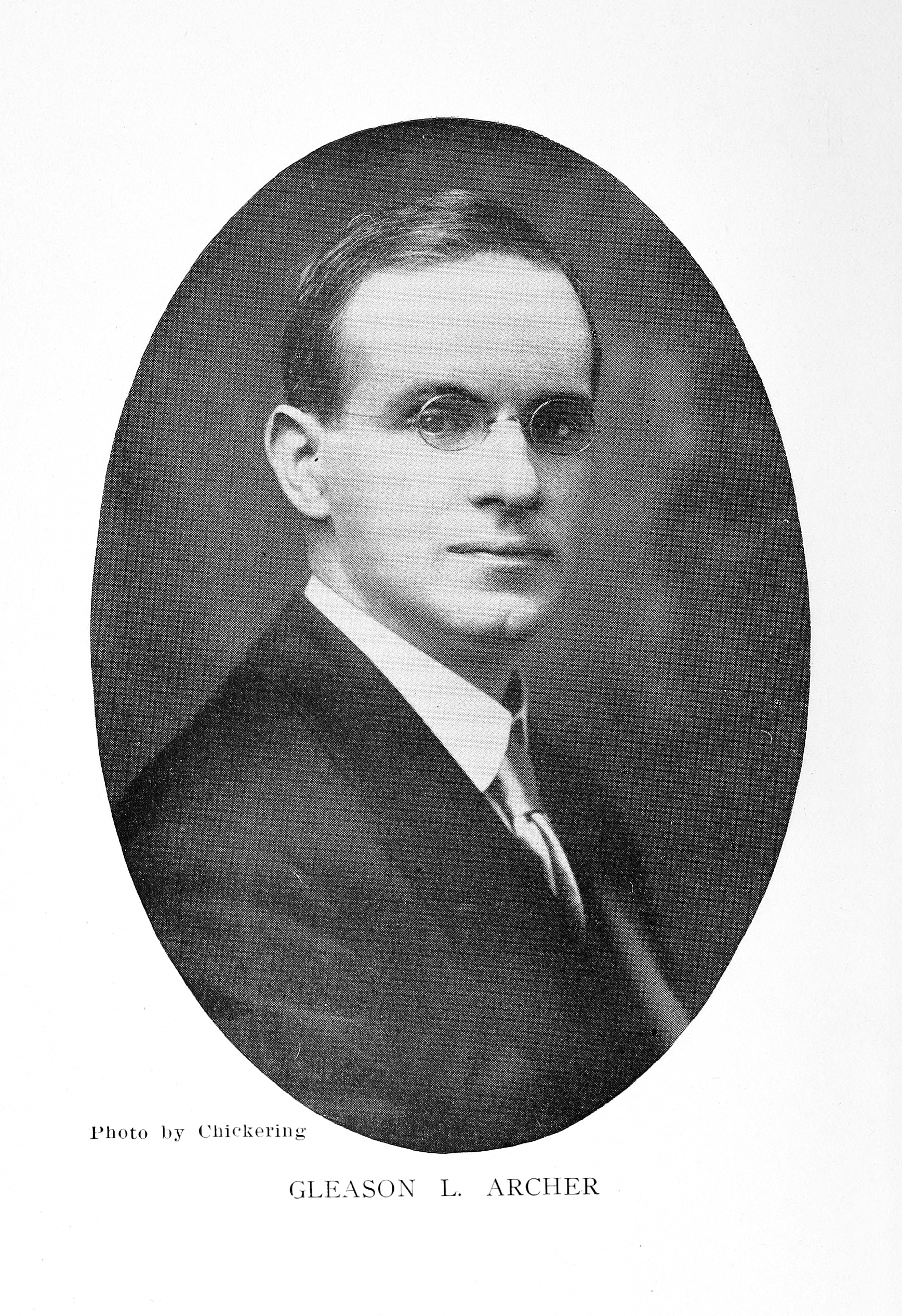
Gleason Archer Sr., ca. 1915

Gleason Archer Sr. (October 29, 1880 – June 28, 1966) was an American academic who was the founder and first president of Suffolk University and Suffolk Law School in Boston, Massachusetts. Archer was also an extensive writer and radio broadcaster.

== Early life and education ==
Gleason Leonard Archer was born in 1880 in Great Pond, Maine. Archer was the third son in a family of seven, and at 13-years old he left Sabattus, Maine. He graduated in 1902 as valedictorian of his high school class. Eventually Archer borrowed funds to attend Boston University School of Law. He worked six days a week as a waiter to pay for his college studies and during the summer he worked at a resort on Cape Cod. During that time, he shattered his knee in a fall, and to receive adequate medical care, set out for Boston on crutches. Along the way, George A. Frost, President of the Boston Garter Company picked Archer up, and developed a fatherlike relationship with Archer and agreed to pay for his medical bills. Frost eventually gave Archer the money to complete his study at Boston University with the stipulation that he pass on the favor to other boys if he had the opportunity. Archer received his B.A. from Boston University in 1904 and his LL.B. in 1906.

== Founding Suffolk University ==
Upon graduation from law school and passing the bar in 1906, Archer founded Suffolk University Law School (originally known as Archer's Law School) while still maintaining a private practice. Archer's goal was to build an evening law school (and eventually a university) which would provide an education regardless of economic class, race or religion. The school started off in Archer's home at night, but eventually in 1907 moved to Archer's law offices. In 1915 Archer wrote a book titled "The Educational Octopus" detailing the various difficulties surmounted in founding the school and the strong opposition from Harvard University. (the entire text is available here) Many of Suffolk's earliest students were working-class Irish immigrants.

By 1930 Suffolk Law School was one of the largest law schools in the United States. Archer founded The Suffolk College of Arts and Sciences in 1934, and the Sawyer School of Management—then known as the College of Business Administration—in 1937. Archer served as President of Suffolk University and Suffolk Law School until 1948. He was the author of over 30 books about diverse topics ranging from law to history to religion. Archer also served as a popular NBC radio broadcaster during the 1920s and 1930s and was a critic of Franklin Delano Roosevelt. Archer wrote the first major history of radio broadcasting in 1938.

== Radio career ==
Archer began a series of radio broadcasts about criminal law on Boston's WBZ radio in November 1929. His first broadcast was on November 12, entitled "Everybody is Presumed to Know the Law." By the summer of 1930, these talks had become a program called "Laws That Safeguard Society," heard once a week on the NBC Radio Network. Archer discussed important legal precedents, in terms the average person could understand. His first network program was "Ignorance of the Law is No Excuse." The series aired until 1934.

== Family and retirement ==
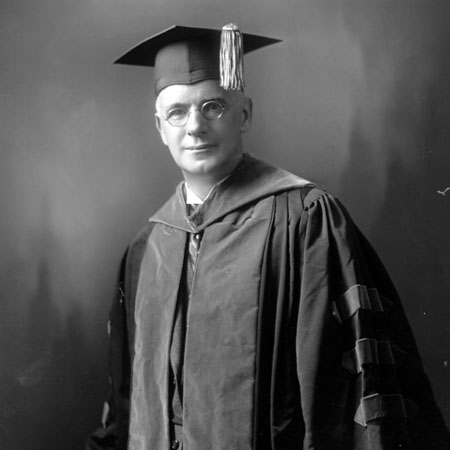
Gleason Archer Sr.

On October 6, 1906, Archer married Elizabeth Snyder (1884-1961), daughter of Rev. Henry S. Snyder, pastor of the Gilbertville Congregational Church. The Archers were the parents of the prominent Reformed theologian and author Gleason Archer Jr. and two other children, Allan F. Archer and Marian G. Archer. Archer's wife, Elizabeth Archer died in 1961, and he married Pauline (Polly) Clark in 1963. Archer was a descendant of John Archer who came to America from England prior to 1775 and fought for the American cause during the Revolutionary War, receiving a large tract of land in Maine after the War. Gleason Archer was also a Mayflower descendant and wrote several genealogical works.

Archer was a member of Park Street Church where he was active in the men's club, serving as president for several years. For many years, he summered in Norwell, Massachusetts. Later, Archer became a longtime resident of Pembroke, Massachusetts where he farmed blueberries and fished in retirement. Archer Sr. died in 1966, aged 86, of prostate cancer and was buried in Centre Cemetery in Pembroke.
