= Sylvie Kandé =

- Born: 13 October 1957 (age 68); Paris, France
- Education: Lycée Louis-le-Grand, Paris-Sorbonne University, Paris Diderot University
- Occupations: Poet, historian
- Awards: Louise-Labé Prize, Lucienne Gracia-Vincent Prize

Sylvie Kandé (born 13 October 1957, Paris) is a French poet and historian. She won the Louise-Labé Prize, and the Lucienne Gracia-Vincent Prize.

== Life ==
She studied at Lycée Louis-le-Grand. and Paris-Sorbonne University.

She taught French literature at Stanford University. She graduated with a PhD from Paris Diderot University. She teaches at State University of New York at Old Westbury.

Her work appeared in Guernica, The New York Review of Books.

Kandé was among the first authors published in a new imprint launched by Éditions Gallimard in 2000, the Continents noirs series.

She is a member of the translation committee of the PEN America.

== Works ==
- Lagon, lagunes. Tableau de Mémoire (2000)
- La quête infinie de l’autre rive: épopée en trois chants (2011),
  - The Neverending Quest for the Other Shore: An Epic in Three Cantos (Wesleyan University Press, 2022)
- Gestuaire (2016)
