= Catherine Crier =

American journalist and author

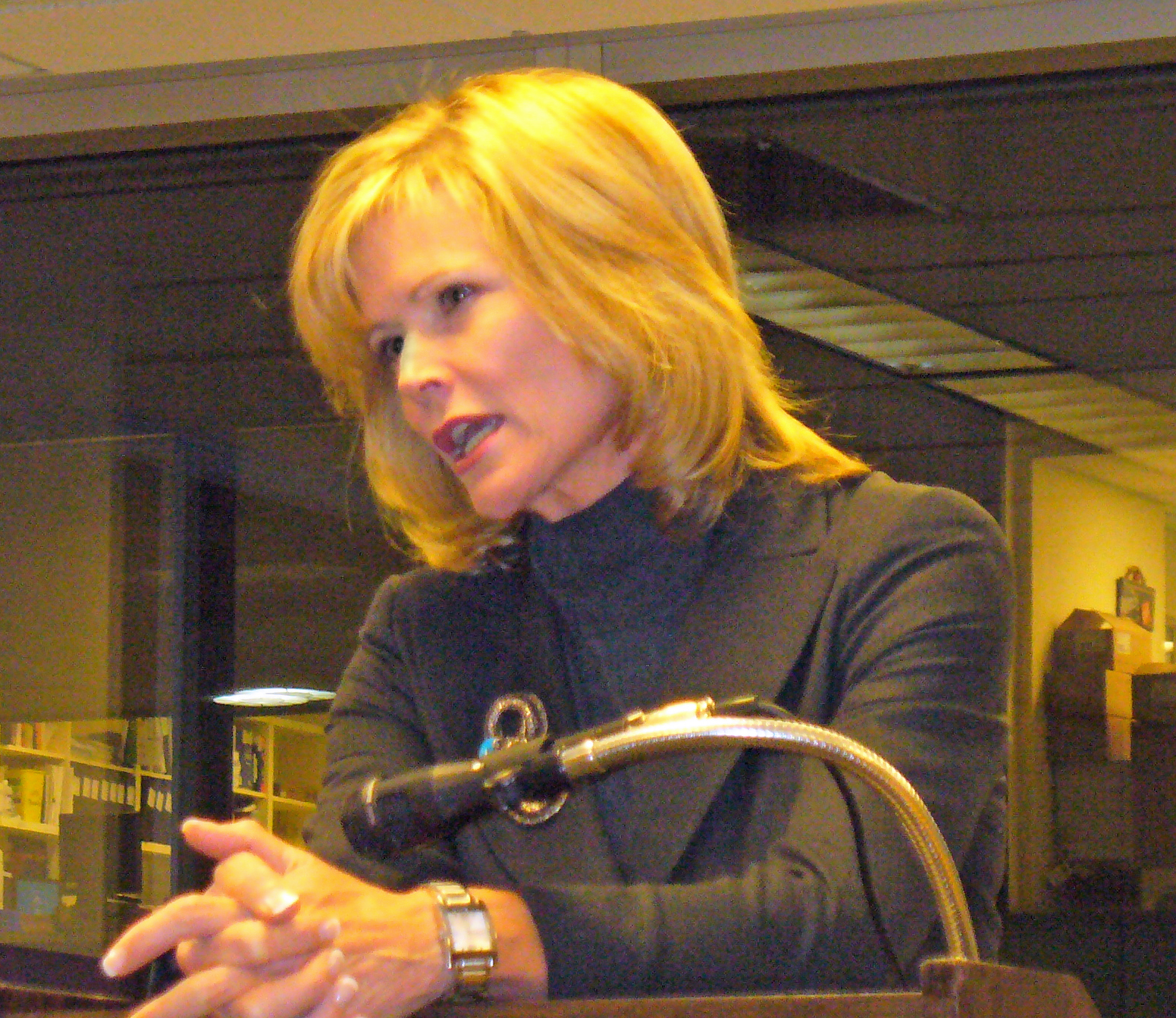
- Catherine Crier discussing her book about the Susan Polk case, Final Analysis.
- Born: Catherine Jean Crier; November 6, 1954 (age 71); Dallas, Texas, U.S.
- Occupations: Author, television journalist, and former state elected judge.
- Notable credit(s): Former Texas state judge and host of Catherine Crier Live, author of The Case Against Lawyers, A Deadly Game, Contempt, Final Analysis, and Patriot Acts.
- Website: www.patriotacts.com

Catherine Jean Crier is an American journalist and author of A Deadly Game and The Case Against Lawyers.

She was the youngest elected state judge in Texas history at age thirty and served as a Texas State District Judge for the 162nd District Court.

Crier is currently a managing partner in Cajole Entertainment, developing television, film, and documentary projects. She regularly appears as a guest contributor and panelist on various news programs, conducts speaking engagements across the country, and blogs for The Huffington Post. Her fifth book, Patriot Acts: What Americans Must Do to Save the Republic, was published in 2011. Her current events blog was launched to coincide with publication of the book.

== Early life ==
Crier was born in Dallas, Texas in 1954 to Ann, a horse breeder and homemaker, and William Crier, a banker. She has two sisters. In 1970, Crier's family bought a farm in a Dallas suburb where she hauled hay, cleaned stalls, and competed in Arabian horse shows across the Southwest. She attended Richardson High School.

Crier entered the University of Texas at Austin at age 16, earning her Bachelor of Arts degree in political science and international affairs, then received a Juris Doctor in two and a half years from Southern Methodist University School of Law.

== Career ==
=== Legal and judicial service ===
Crier began her career in law in 1978 in the Dallas County District Attorney's office, starting as an Assistant District Attorney, then becoming Felony Chief Prosecutor. From 1982 to 1984, Crier was a civil litigation attorney with Riddle & Brown, handling complex business and corporate matters.

In 1984, she was elected to the 162nd District Court in Dallas County as a State District Judge, becoming the youngest elected state judge in Texas history. During her tenure on the bench, Crier also served as Administrative Judge for the Civil District Courts and worked with the ABA, National Judicial College, and Texas Legislature. Shortly after her election to a second term on the bench, a chance meeting with a television news executive led to a career change.

=== Broadcast journalism career ===
In 1990, Crier began her television career at CNN. She was co-anchor of both Inside Politics ‘92, a daily show which followed the 1992 political process, and The World Today, the premier evening newscast. Additionally, she hosted Crier & Company, a live, half-hour news talk show. This show included a panel of female policy experts who discussed popular national and international issues.

Crier joined ABC News in 1993, where she served as a correspondent on the network's primetime news magazine program 20/20. She was awarded a 1996 Emmy for Outstanding Investigative Journalism for her work on the segment "The Predators" which examined nursing home abuses throughout the United States. She was also a correspondent and regular substitute anchor for Peter Jennings on ABC's World News Tonight, as well as a substitute host for Ted Koppel on Nightline.

In 1996, Crier became one of the founding television anchors for the Fox News Channel with her prime time program, The Crier Report, a live, hour-long nightly show, during which she interviewed leading newsmakers of the day. Additionally, she co-anchored the evening news, election coverage and Fox Files, a magazine news show aired on the parent network.

Crier joined Court TV's team of anchors in 1999. She served as Executive Editor, Legal News Specials, in addition to hosting Catherine Crier Live, a live daily series, covering the day's "front-page" stories. Catherine Crier Live ran for six years until it was cancelled in 2007.

She also was a horse racing analyst for ESPN in 2004.

== Writing ==
Crier released her New York Times bestseller, The Case Against Lawyers in October 2002. Her second book, A Deadly Game: The Untold Story of the Scott Peterson Investigation became a #1 New York Times bestseller and was followed by Contempt – How the Right is Wronging American Justice, and Final Analysis: The Untold Story of the Susan Polk Murder Case. Her fifth book, Patriot Acts – What Americans Must Do to Save the Republic, was published in 2011.

=== Books ===
- The Case Against Lawyers: How the Lawyers, Politicians, and Bureaucrats Have Turned the Law into an Instrument of Tyranny – and What We as Citizens Have to Do About It (ISBN 978-0-7679-0505-3, 2003)
- Contempt: How the Right Is Wronging American Justice (ISBN 1-59071-064-9, 2005)
- A Deadly Game: The Untold Story of the Scott Peterson Investigation (ISBN 978-0-06-084963-4, 2007)
- Final Analysis: The Untold Story of the Susan Polk Murder Case (ISBN 978-0-06-113452-4, 2008)
- Patriot Acts: What Americans Must Do to Save the Republic (ISBN 978-1-4391-9492-8, 2011)
