= Jeff Biederman =

American entertainment attorney

- Other name: Charles J. Biederman
- Occupation: Entertainment lawyer
- Employer: Greenberg Traurig
- Title: Partner
- Parent(s): Don Biederman (father), Marna Biederman (mother)
- Relatives: Melissa Anne Biederman (sister)

Jeff Biederman (also known as Charles J. Biederman) is an American entertainment lawyer and partner at Greenberg Traurig. He is known for representing the Estate of Miles Davis and for his work on music catalog, publishing, and entertainment-related acquisitions.

== Early life and family ==
Biederman is the son of Don Biederman (Donald Ellis Biederman), an entertainment attorney, music industry executive, and legal educator, and Marna Biederman. His father was Vice President of Legal Affairs and Administration at ABC Records beginning in 1977. He later was Executive Vice President of Legal and Business Affairs and General Counsel at Warner/Chappell Music, where he served for 17 years. Don Biederman founded the Donald E. Biederman Entertainment, Media, and Sports Law Institute at Southwestern Law School.

Jeff Biederman has discussed the influence of his father on his career in entertainment law and his family's connection to Southwestern Law School's entertainment law program.

His sister, Melissa Anne Biederman, is an attorney who served as an assistant attorney general in Iowa.

== Career ==
After graduating law school, Biederman began working in New York City in the areas of product liability and trademark litigation. After three years, he moved to Atlanta, where he worked in employment litigation. He then began work as an entertainment lawyer getting new bands signed, following which he moved to Nashville. After six years, Biederman returned to Los Angeles.

Biederman is a partner at Greenberg Traurig and a member of the firm's Entertainment and Media Practice. Before joining Greenberg Traurig in 2021, Biederman was a partner in the entertainment practice at Manatt, Phelps & Phillips. Biederman has represented the Estate of Miles Davis and recording artist Dierks Bentley. Biederman represented the Miles Davis estate in Reservoir Media's acquisition of rights in Davis's catalog.

== Publications ==
Biederman was a co-author of the fifth edition of Law and Business of the Entertainment Industries, published by Praeger.

== Recognition ==
He has appeared on Billboard's list of Top Music Lawyers and Variety lists recognizing entertainment attorneys and dealmakers.
