= Don Biederman =

Don Biederman may refer to:

- Don Biederman (racing driver) (1940–1999), Canadian stock car racer
- Don Biederman (attorney) (1934–2002), American entertainment attorney, music executive, and professor
- Don Biederman, a character in the 1998 film Deep Impact
