= Kevin J. Greene =

American lawyer and legal scholar

Kevin Jerome Greene (born in New York City, New York) is an American lawyer and professor of contract music law and entertainment law at Southwestern Law School in Los Angeles, California. Greene was among the first legal scholars to examine the treatment of African-American art forms, such as the blues, under intellectual property law.

== Education and military service ==
Greene began his undergraduate studies at Morehouse College in Atlanta, then left to join the U.S. Marines, where he was assigned to an F-4 Phantom jet squadron in the Far East. After completing his Marine Corps service with honors, he received his B.A. at the State University of New York at Old Westbury, and his J.D. at Yale Law School and then clerked for James H. Brickley of the Michigan Supreme Court.

== Legal career ==
While at the Wall Street law firm of Cravath, Swaine and Moore, he represented Time-Warner/HBO and subsequently practiced entertainment law in New York City at Frankfurt, Garbus, Klein & Selz. Representative clients included film director Spike Lee, singer Bobby Brown, and the rap group Public Enemy.

In 2014, Greene served as an expert witness for the legal team of funk musician George Clinton in a copyright case in the Federal 9th Circuit Court of Appeals. In 2016, Professor Greene was selected as the winner in the academics category of the Vanguard Award for Innovation in Intellectual Property by the Intellectual Property Institute of the State Bar of California. In 2018, Greene was selected as a Fellow of the American Bar Association. In 2019, Greene served as the lead IP expert in a landmark right of publicity case in California state court between the heirs of the Hansen Juice company and Coca-Cola Corporation.

In 2020, Greene was hired as a tenured professor at Southwestern Law School in Los Angeles where he is the John J. Schumacher Chair Professor.

== Articles ==
- "Idea Theft as a Hollywood Business Model: Toward Optimal Standards for Idea Misappropriation in the Entertainment Context, " John Marshall Intellectual Property Law Journal, 2010
- "Intellectual Property at the Intersection of Race and Gender: Or Lady Sings the Blues," American University Journal of Gender in Society. Policy & Law, v.16: 365 (2008)
- "Trademark Law and Racial Subordination: From the Marketing of Stereotypes to Norms of Authorship," Syracuse Law Review v.58: 431 (2008)
- "There's No Business Like Show Business: Using Multimedia Materials to Teach Entertainment Law," St. Louis University Law Journal. 52:765 (2008)
- "Intellectual Property Expansion: The Good, the Bad and the Right of Publicity," Chapman Law Review 11:521 (2008)
- "Copynorms, Black Cultural Production and the Debate over African-American Reparations," Cardozo Arts & Ent. Law Journal. 25:1179 (2008)
- "What the Treatment of African-American Artists Can Teach About Copyright Law, "in Peter K Yu, Intellectual Property and Information Wealth: Issue and Practices in the Digital Age (2007)
- "Abusive Trademark Litigation and the Shrinking Doctrine of Consumer Confusion: Rethinking Trademark Paradigms in the Context of Entertainment Media and Cyberspace," Harvard Journal of Journal of Law & Public Policy 27:609 (2004)
- "Clearance Issues From a Litigation Perspective: Intellectual Property Infringement and Motion Picture Liability," in Counseling Clients in the Entertainment Industry 2: 255 (Practicing Law Institute, 2001)
- "Motion Picture Copyright Infringement and the Presumption of Irreparable Harm: Toward a Reevaluation of the Standard for Injunctive Relief," Rutgers Law Journal 31:173 (1999)
- "Copyright, Culture, and Black Music: A Legacy of Unequal Protection," Hastings Communications & Entertainment Law Journal 20: 339 (1999)
- "Terrorism as Impermissible Political Violence: An International Law Framework," Vermont Law Review. 16:461 (1992)
