= Leigh H. Taylor =

American attorney, professor and law school dean

- Education: Bachelor of Arts, JD
- Alma mater: University of Tulsa, University of Tulsa College of Law, New York University School of Law
- Occupations: Dean of Southwestern Law School and of Claude W. Pettit College of Law at Ohio Northern University.

Leigh H. Taylor is an American attorney, professor and law school dean who served as former Dean of Southwestern Law School and of Claude W. Pettit College of Law at Ohio Northern University. The library at Southwestern Law School is named in his honor.

== Education ==
Taylor attended the University of Tulsa for his B.A. and the University of Tulsa College of Law for his J.D., where he served as editor-in-chief of the Law Review. He also received an LL.M. from New York University School of Law and completed a research fellowship at the University of Chicago.

== Academic career ==
Taylor began his legal teaching career at DePaul University College of Law in Chicago, Illinois after working in the U.S. Department of Justice; he then became the youngest law school dean in the country when he became dean at Claude W. Pettit College of Law at Ohio Northern University. The next year (1978), he moved to Los Angeles to become dean at Southwestern Law School. During his tenure as dean at Southwestern, he oversaw the Law School's conversion of the famous art deco Bullocks Wilshire Building into academic facilities, including the law library which now bears his name.

While at Southwestern, Dean Taylor served as a long-term trustee for the Law School Admissions Council, which governs the LSAT and procedures related to law school admissions, as well as for the National Association for Law Placement, which coordinates law school-employer relations.

Taylor served as Dean of Southwestern Law for 27 years and is credited with raising the institution's prominence during that period.
