= L. Eudora Pettigrew =

American educator (1928–2021)

Luella Eudora Pettigrew
- Pettigrew in 1986
- Born: Luella Eudora Williams; 1928; Hopkinsville, Kentucky, U.S.
- Died: December 6, 2021 (aged 92–93); Townsend, Delaware
- Occupations: Academic administrator, Political scientist
- Title: President of SUNY Old Westbury (1986-1998)

Academic background
- Education: West Virginia State College (B.A., 1950), Southern Illinois University (M.A., in 1963, Ph.D. in 1966)
- Thesis: Similarities and Differences in Linguistic Code Behavior

L. Eudora Pettigrew (1928 – December 6, 2021) was an American professor and academic administrator who served as the president of the State University of New York at Old Westbury. She was the first African-American college president in the SUNY system when she was named president of SUNY Old Westbury in 1986.

== Early life and education ==
Pettigrew was born in Hopkinsville, Kentucky in 1928. Her mother was a school teacher and her father a licensed County Farm agent. Pettigrew earned a bachelor's degree in music from West Virginia State College in 1950. She earned her master's degree in rehabilitation counseling from Southern Illinois University in 1963, where she also earned her doctorate in educational psychology in 1966. Her doctoral dissertation was "Similarities and Differences in Linguistic Code Behavior."

== Career ==
From 1966 to 1970, Pettigrew served as assistant professor of psychology at the University of Bridgeport in Connecticut. From 1970 to 1980, she was the chairwoman and professor of Urban and Metropolitan Studies at Michigan State University. In that role, Pettigrew was the first African American to serve as chair of any department at Michigan State University.

From 1980 to 1986, Pettigrew was the associate provost of instruction and professor of urban affairs and public policy at the University of Delaware and held this position until taking a role at SUNY Old Westbury. When Pettigrew was named associate provost, she became the first Black person named to a high administrative post at the university.

In 1986, she was named the President of SUNY Old Westbury and served in that role for twelve years until 1998.

Pettigrew served on the International Association of University Presidents (IAUP)/United Nations Commission on Disarmament Education Conflict Resolution, and Peace, which promotes global awareness and competence as well as peace and international understanding through education, as co-chair (1990–1996) and chair (1996–2002). She represented IAUP at the UNESCO Peace Program in Palestine from 1996 to 2002. and at the European University Center for Peace Studies's chair program in Austria on human rights, democracy, peace, and tolerance.

Pettigrew was awarded Doctor of Philosophy honoris causa degrees from University of Pretoria, Holy Family College, and Western Connecticut State University.
