= North American Consortium on Legal Education =

The North American Consortium on Legal Education (NACLE) comprises 13 participating law schools in Canada, Mexico, and the United States. The general purpose of NACLE is to promote and share understanding of the legal systems within North American countries. The specific purpose of the Consortium is to enhance the capabilities of each member to provide high quality legal education and research appropriate to the demands of the professional environment in North America.

== Consortium Members ==
The following law schools and faculties are members of NACLE:

Canada:

- University of British Columbia, Faculty of Law
- Dalhousie University, Faculty of Law
- McGill Faculty of Law
- University of Ottawa, Faculty of Law

Mexico:

- Centro de Investigación y Docencia Económicas (CIDE)
- Instituto Tecnológico de Estudios Superiores de Monterrey (ITESM), Monterrey
- Universidad Nacional Autónoma de México (UNAM), Facultad de Derecho and Instituto de Investigaciones Jurídicas
- Universidad Panamericana, Facultad de Derecho

United States:

- University of Arizona, James E. Rogers College of Law
- George Washington University Law School
- University of Houston Law Center
- Southwestern Law School
- Suffolk University Law School
