= Joseph Glannon =

American lawyer

Joseph Glannon is an American lawyer who is a professor at Suffolk University Law School and author of several legal guides. He has taught courses in civil procedure, conflict of laws, and torts at Suffolk since 1980.

He received a Bachelor of Arts in English, a Master of Arts in Teaching, and a Juris Doctor from Harvard University. Before attending law school, Glannon served as an assistant dean of men and coordinator of student activities at Bates College in Lewiston, Maine. After graduating from Harvard Law, Glannon was a clerk for the Massachusetts Appeals Court.

== Bibliography ==
- The Glannon Guide to Civil Procedure, 6th Edition
- Civil Procedure Examples & Explanations
- Torts: Examples and Explanation
