= Suffolk University Law School =

Law school in Boston, Massachusetts, U.S.

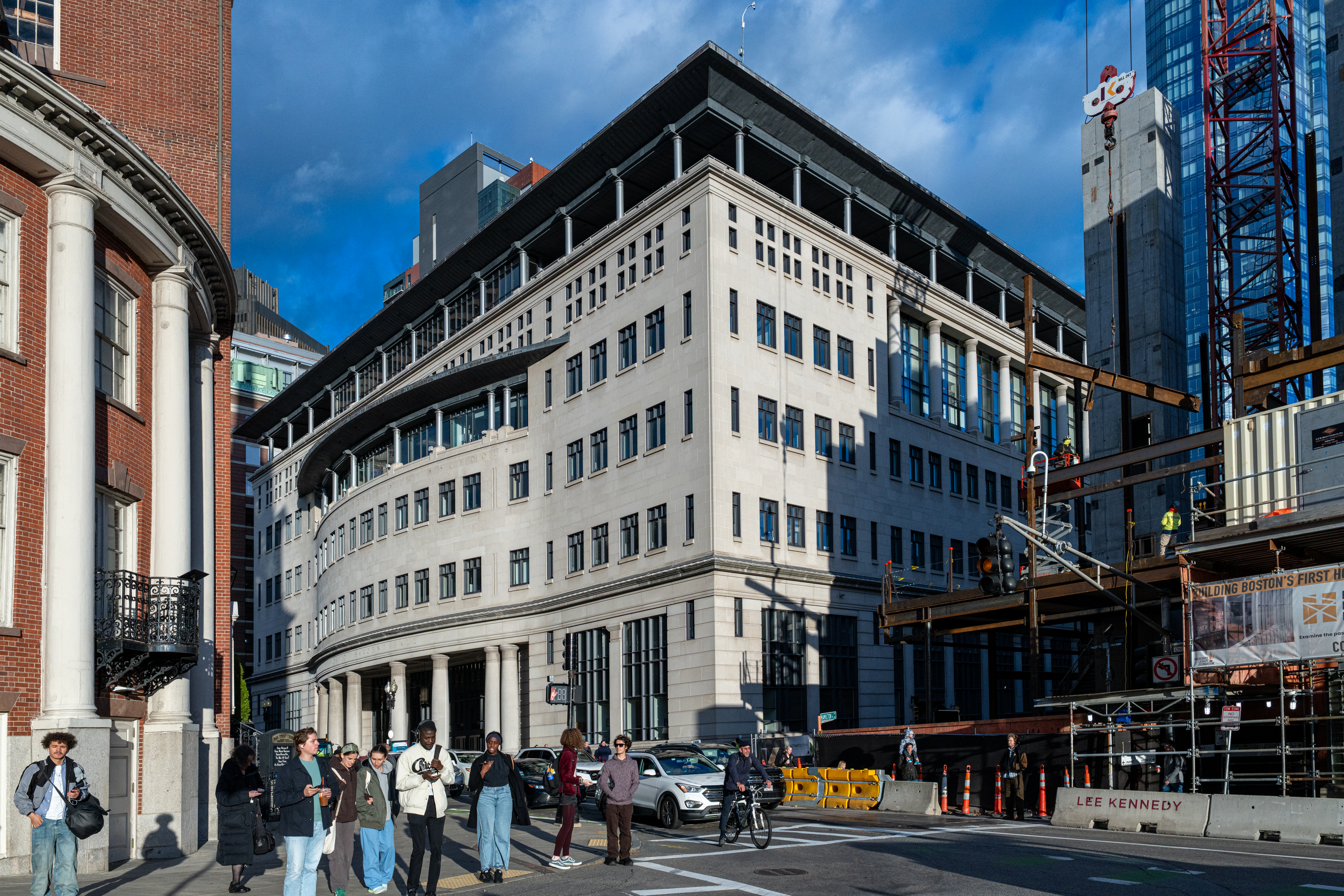
- Suffolk Law School building
- Motto: Honestas et Diligentia (Latin) "Honesty and Diligence"
- Parent school: Suffolk University
- Established: 1906 (120 years ago)
- School type: Private
- Dean: Andrew M. Perlman
- Location: Boston, Massachusetts, U.S.
- Enrollment: 1,176 (2021)
- Faculty: 153 (2021)
- USNWR ranking: 130th (tie) (2024)
- Bar pass rate: 80% (July 2021, First Time Takers)
- Website: www.suffolk.edu/law
- ABA profile: 509 Information Report

Suffolk University Law School (also known as Suffolk Law School) is a private law school in the downtown of Boston, Massachusetts, affiliated with Suffolk University. It is located across the street from the Boston Common and the Freedom Trail, two blocks from the Massachusetts State House, and a short walk to the financial district. Suffolk Law was founded in 1906 by Gleason Archer Sr. to provide a legal education for those who traditionally lacked the opportunity to study law because of socio-economic or racial discrimination.

Suffolk Law school has full-time, part-time evening, hybrid online, accelerated and dual-degree JD programs. It has been accredited by the American Bar Association since 1953 and the Association of American Law Schools since 1977.

According to Suffolk's Office of Professional and Career Development 2021 ABA-required disclosures, 82.8% of the Class of 2021 obtained full-time, long-term, bar admission required or JD advantage employment nine months after graduation.

== History ==
One of New England's oldest law schools, Suffolk was founded in 1906 by lawyer Gleason Leonard Archer as the "Suffolk School of Law." The school was named after its location in Suffolk County, Massachusetts. Archer's goal was to provide immigrants and the working class with the opportunity to study law. In 1907, Archer moved the school from Roxbury, Massachusetts to downtown Boston. Suffolk Law School's first student passed the bar in 1908. By 1930, Archer developed Suffolk into one of the largest law schools in the country, and the law school received full accreditation from the American Bar Association (ABA). Originally an all-male school, with the New England School of Law serving as a sister school, Suffolk became co-educational in 1937. In 1999, Suffolk Law School opened its new building at 120 Tremont Street, near the Boston Common.

Many alumni were historically notable for breaking boundaries in the legal field. Suffolk University founder Archer Gleason wanted to "open the doors to higher education to all capable students," and as a result the school was more inclusive of students from marginalized backgrounds.

Thaddeus Alexander Kitchener, a Jamaican immigrant, was the first person of color to graduate from Suffolk Law, earning his degree in 1913. Louis Eugene Pasco, who earned his degree in 1914, was the first Latino to graduate from the school. In 1922, Shichiro Hayashi became the first Asian alumnus of Suffolk Law. In 1925, Nelson D. Simons, future chief of the Mashpee Wampanoag Tribe, was the first Native American to graduate from the school. After graduating from Suffolk Law in 1929, Harry Hom Dow went on to become the first Chinese-American to pass the Massachusetts Bar Exam. The first woman to graduate from Suffolk Law was Marian Archer MacDonald in 1937. Charlotte Anne Perretta, the first woman to sit on the Massachusetts Appeals Court as an associate justice, graduated from Suffolk Law in 1967. Linda Dalianis became the first female appointee to the New Hampshire Superior Court (1980) and the New Hampshire Supreme Court (2000), and chief justice of the New Hampshire Supreme Court in 2010.

== Curriculum and programs ==
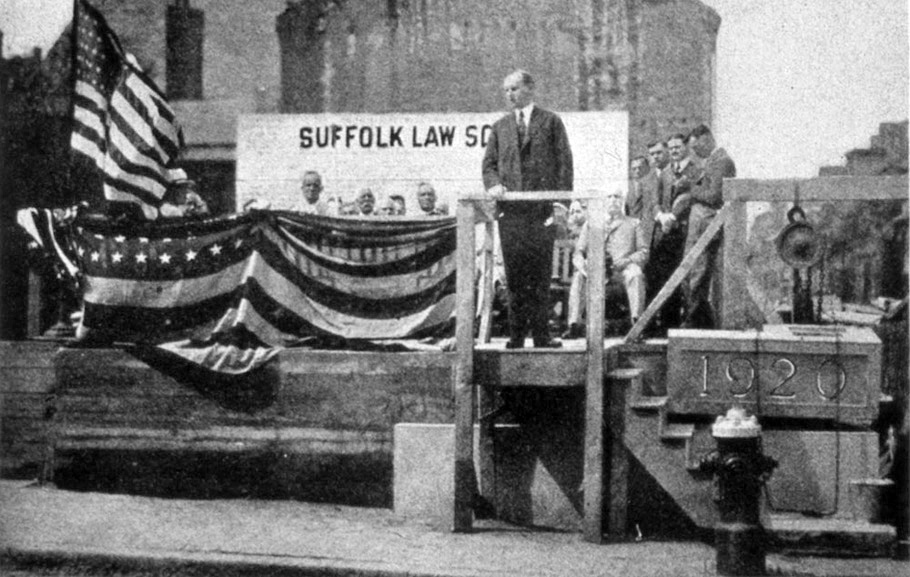
Calvin Coolidge, then Governor of Massachusetts and eventual 30th President of the United States, laying cornerstone for the law building, in 1920.

Suffolk Law has full-time, part-time evening, hybrid online, accelerated and dual-degree JD programs. Academic concentrations are available in intellectual property, international law, business law & financial services, health & biomedical law, legal innovation & technology, and trial & appellate advocacy. Dual degree options include: JD/MBA; Accelerated JD/MBA (three years for both degrees); JD/Master of Public Administration; JD/Master of Science in finance; JD/Master of Science in crime & justice studies; JD/Master of Sciences in law: life sciences; and the Accelerated JD/LL.M. in Taxation (three years for both degrees). The school also offers the Doctor of Juridical Science (SJD).

Accelerated JD students begin first year (1L) classes in May and attend classes year-round so they can earn their degrees one year faster than traditional JD students (two years full time; three years part-time). Accelerated students have the same required coursework, take the same number of credits, and pay the same per-semester cost as traditional JD students— but graduate one year earlier.

Part-time evening JD students take a reduced schedule with all classes offered after 6 p.m. Evening students can choose the traditional or accelerated track, to graduate in as few as 2.5 years (including two summers) or up to four years (classes in the fall and spring semesters only).

Hybrid Online JD students earn a JD with a mix of in-person and online classes. They take their first 30 credit hours in-person at Suffolk Law in Boston then enroll in the remaining JD coursework (54 credits) online or a mix of in-person and online. The Hybrid Online JD is available for full- or part-time evening students who achieve a 3.0 during their first year of law school.

Students at ABA-accredited law schools can enroll in summer courses at Suffolk Law. All summer classes are offered after 6 p.m.

Foreign-educated attorneys may enroll in up to 15 non-degree credits at Suffolk Law to satisfy the requirements of Massachusetts Rule 6 and sit for the Massachusetts Bar Exam.

== Admissions ==
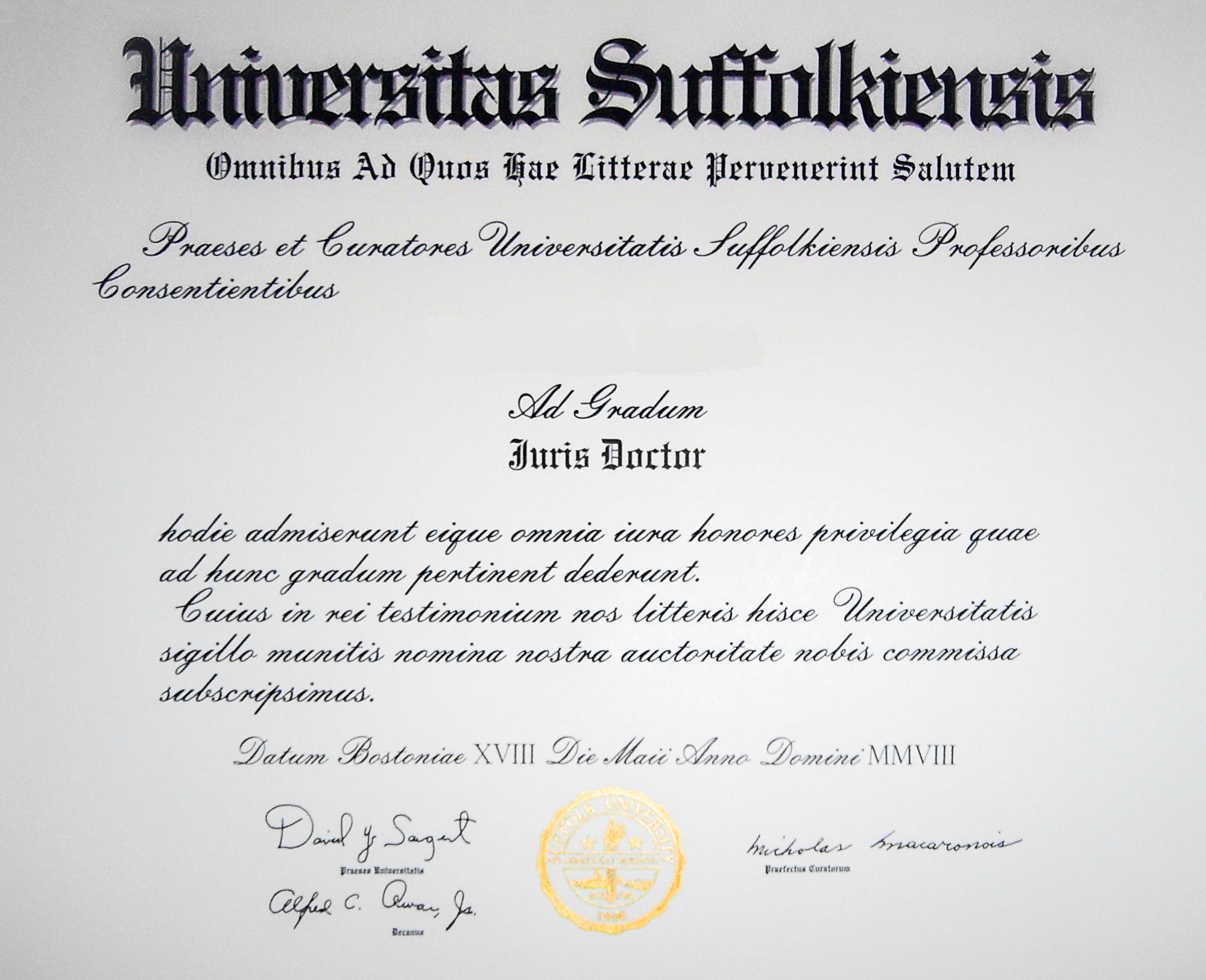
Suffolk University Law School diploma conferring the Juris Doctor degree

In 2023, Suffolk received 2,899 applications for its entering class students of 395 students, which included 299 full-time students and 96 part-time evening students. The school accepted 1,864 applicants having an acceptance rate of 64.30% with 13.38% of applicants enrolling. The median GPA for incoming 2023 Suffolk Law students was 3.55, and the median LSAT score was 154. The 25th-75th percentile GPA was 3.33-3.72 and the 25th-75th percentile LSAT was 150–158. Incoming Suffolk Law School students in 2022 came from 37 states, 7 countries and 211 colleges and universities. The incoming class of 2023 remained among the most diverse since 2014, with 28% of incoming students identifying as ethnically diverse. In addition, 25% of incoming students identified as being first-generation college students.

== Academic rankings and honors ==
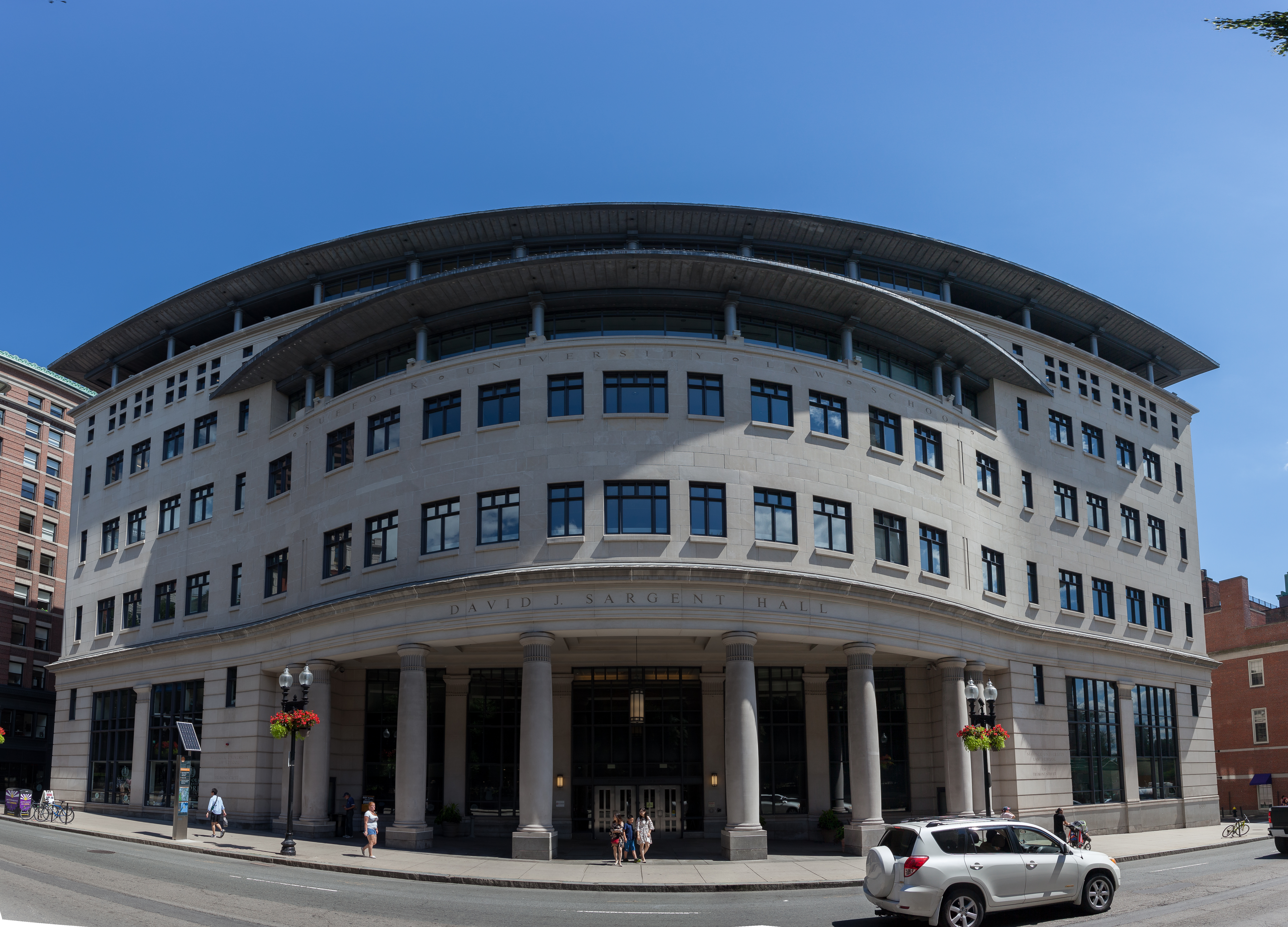
Sargent Hall is near Boston Common

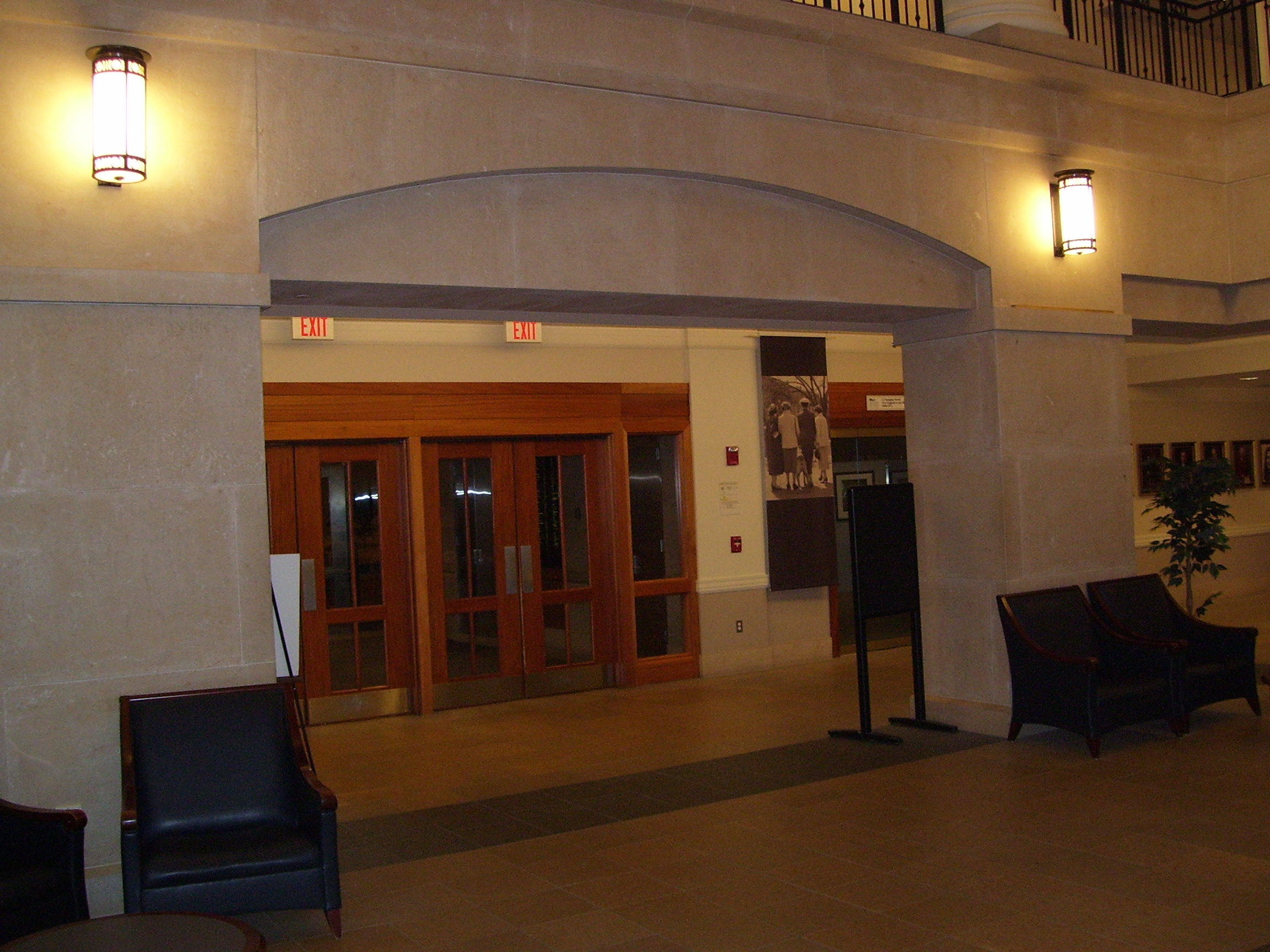
Entryway of Sargent Hall.

In its 2025 guide, U.S. News & World Report ranked Suffolk as the 130th Best Law School. In the US News Best Law Schools guides from 2017 to 2025, Suffolk's clinics, legal writing, trial advocacy, and dispute resolution programs have all ranked in the top 35 (top 20 percent)--the only law school with this distinction.

Suffolk's legal writing program (No. 3 in 2025 Guide) has ranked in the US News top 10 for twelve consecutive years. The clinical program (No. 12) has placed in the top 20 for nine consecutive years. Trial advocacy (No. 31) has been ranked in the top 35 for nine consecutive years. Dispute Resolution is ranked No. 21 and has been in the top 30 for 12 of the last 13 years. Intellectual Property is ranked No. 36. In 2021 (the most current numbered ranking), Suffolk Law's legal technology program was named No. 1 in the nation by PreLaw magazine and is perennially listed among the top programs in the nation.

Suffolk's National Trial Team has won the New England regional championships in the American Association of Justice Student Advocacy Competition or the National Trial Competition 29 times in the last 39 years (as of 2024).

== Libraries and archives ==
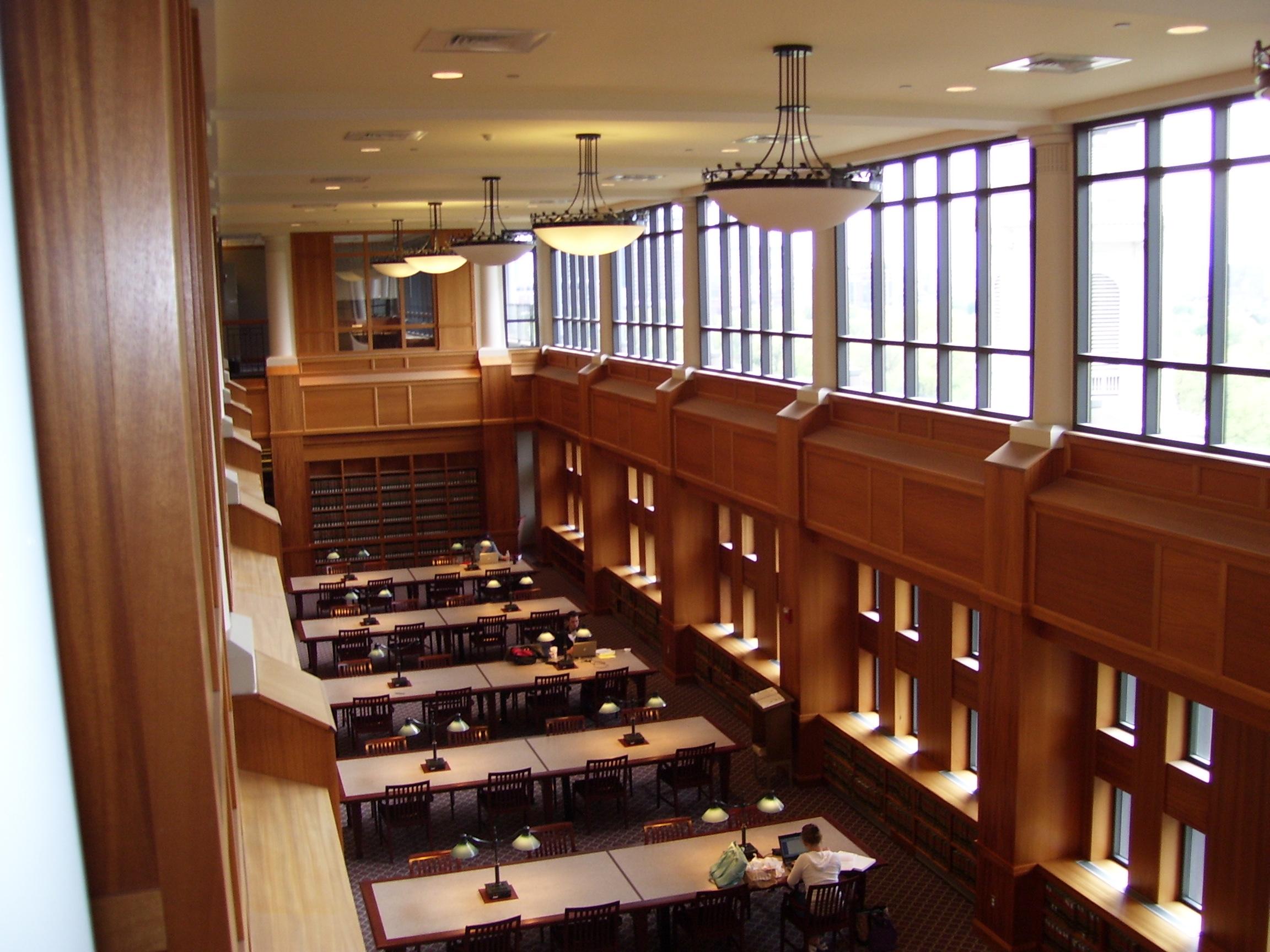
A law library reading room

In 1999, after construction of the new law school building was completed, the John Joseph Moakley Library moved to its new home, on the fifth through seventh floors, in Sargent Hall. The library contains over 450,000 volumes, and budget of new acquisitions reaching approximately $2 million, covering common law and statutes from all major areas of American law in each of the 50 states, the District of Columbia, and with primary legal materials from the U.S. federal government, Canada, the United Kingdom, the United Nations, and the European Union.

The library also features a substantial treatise and periodical collection and houses the John Joseph Moakley Archive and Institute. Some of the collections in the Archive include the Congressman John Joseph Moakley Papers, a collection of the late U.S. Representative's papers which he gave to the school in 2001; the Gleason L. Archer Personal Papers, founder of the Law School and University; the Harry Hom Dow Papers a 1929 Law School graduate; the Jamaica Plain Committee on Central America Collection; and the Records of Suffolk University. The Library also houses law review journals from all ABA accredited law schools in the United States as well as numerous journals from European and Canadian law schools. Suffolk also records and broadcasts oral arguments for the Massachusetts Supreme Judicial Court and has archives of those proceedings available in the library and online.

== Law review and journal publications ==
Suffolk University Law School maintains five student-run publications.

Law Review	Founded	Notes
Suffolk University Law Review	1967	The oldest continuously published scholarly publication at Suffolk Law.
Suffolk Transnational Law Review	1976	Focuses on international legal issues and is the second oldest international law review in existence.
Journal of High Technology Law	1998	Focuses on publishing works related to High Technology Law.
Journal of Health & Biomedical Law	2004	Focuses on cutting-edge legal developments in the field of health law.
Suffolk Journal of Trial and Appellate Advocacy	2005	Provides practical, in-depth analyses of current legal issues relating to trial and appellate practice.

== Employment ==
According to Suffolk Law's office of Professional and Career Development ABA-required disclosures, 83.3% of the Class of 2023 obtained full-time, long-term, bar admission required or JD advantage employment ten months after graduation.

== Costs ==
The tuition at Suffolk Law for the 2022–2023 academic year is $53,920 for the day division and $40,440 for the night division.

== Notable people ==
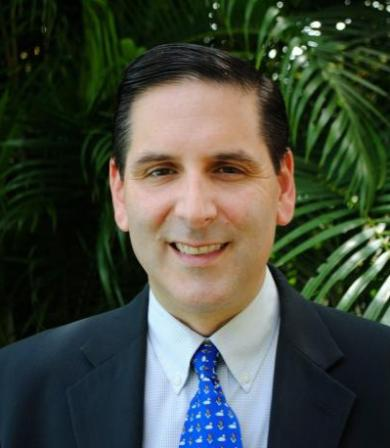
Gustavo Gelpí, Judge U.S. Court of Appeals for the First Circuit

Throughout Suffolk's history, faculty and alumni have played prominent roles in many different fields. Its 24,000 alumni are found in high-level judicial, political, and private positions throughout the United States.

In 1913, Thaddeus Alexander Kitchener, a native of Jamaica, was the first "colored" graduate of the law school. A scholarship is named for him. He went on to help lead the Boston Chronicle newspaper with other West Indian immigrants in Boston. Thomas Vreeland Jones was another early Black graduate and Louis Eugene Pasco was Black and Mexican.

=== Judiciary ===
Several State Supreme Court judges, including associate justices of the Massachusetts Supreme Judicial Court Elspeth B. Cypher (retired), Frank Gaziano, and Serge Georges Jr., graduated from Suffolk Law. Other alumni include Chief Justice Paul Suttell and senior justice Maureen McKenna Goldberg of the Rhode Island Supreme Court, and Chief Justice Paul Reiber of the Vermont Supreme Court.

As of March 2021, 27% of active judges in Massachusetts had graduated from Suffolk Law School, more than any other law school. Out of a total of 440 judges at that time, including 41 federal and 399 state, 118 or more than one out of four sitting judges, were Suffolk Law alumni. As of 2021, more than 40% of all judges in Rhode Island were Suffolk Law graduates.

Suffolk Law alumni on the Massachusetts Supreme Judicial Court
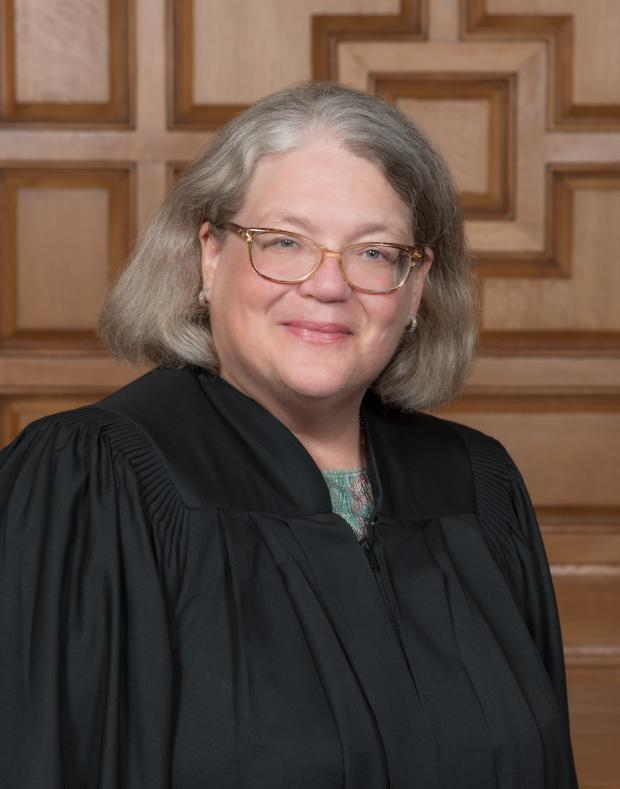
Elspeth B. Cypher, associate justice (retired)

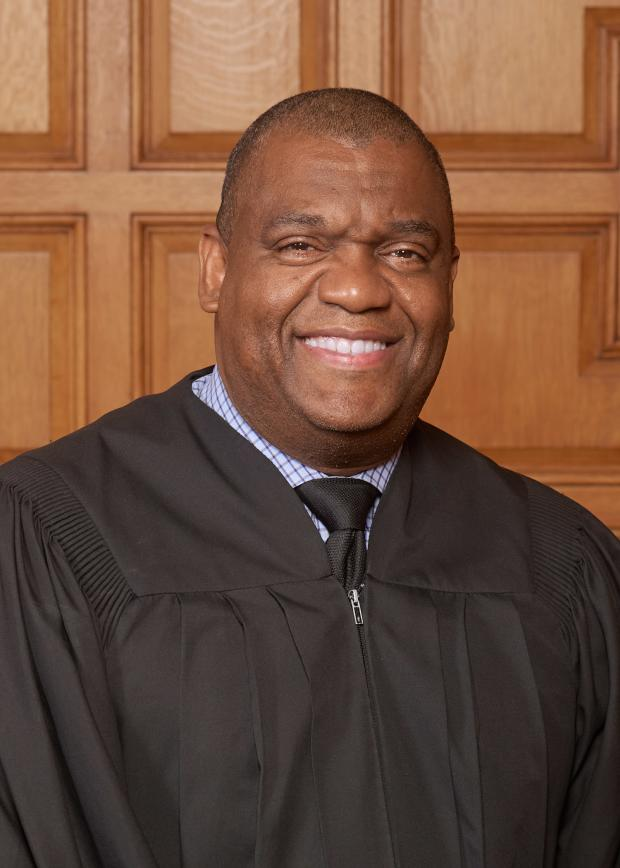
Serge Georges Jr., associate justice

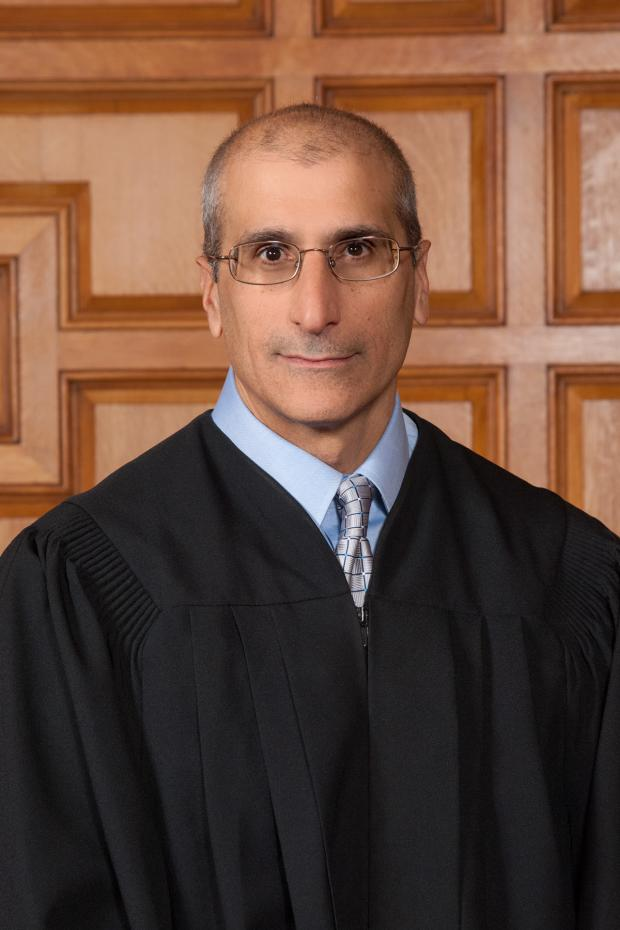
Frank Gaziano, associate justice

Several federal judges graduated from Suffolk Law, including:

- Frank Bailey, Chief Judge of the U.S. Bankruptcy Court for the District of Massachusetts.
- Marianne Bowler, Magistrate Judge of the District Court for the District of Massachusetts
- Gustavo Gelpí, circuit judge of the Court of Appeals for the First Circuit.
- Timothy S. Hillman, Senior United States district judge of the District Court for the District of Massachusetts.
- Myong J. Joun, U.S. District Court, District of Massachusetts
- Richard J. Leon, Senior United States district judge of the District Court for the District of Columbia.
- Mary S. McElroy, United States district judge of the District Court for the District of Rhode Island.

=== Government ===
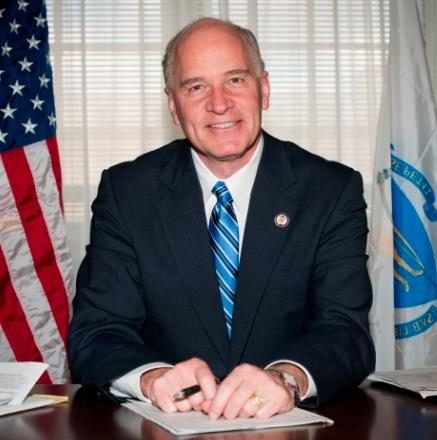
Massachusetts Congressman Bill Keating

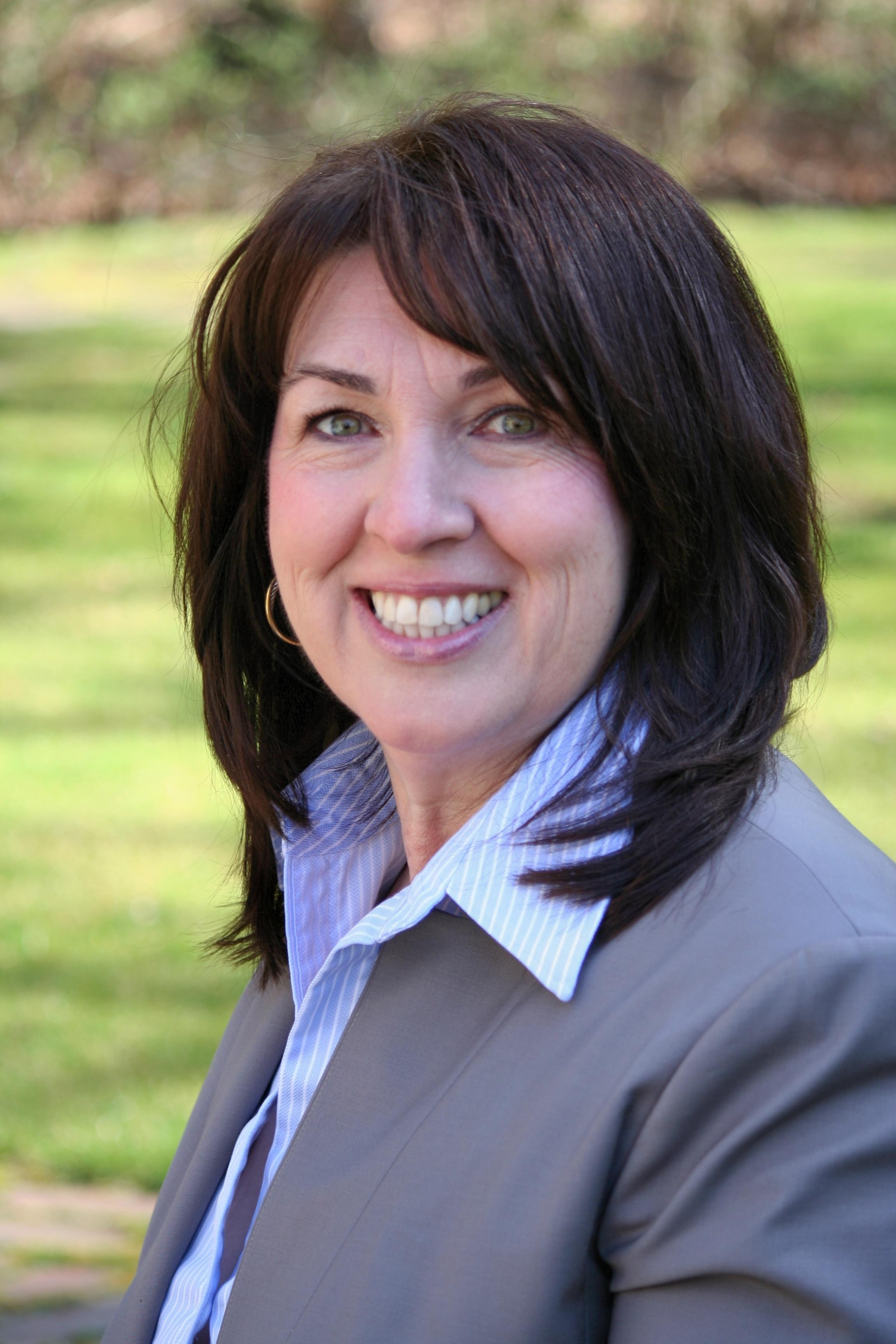
Claire D. Cronin, U.S. Ambassador to Ireland

Graduates of the school include the U.S. Ambassador to Ireland Claire D. Cronin, Massachusetts Secretary of State William F. Galvin, General Counsel for the United States Senate Select Committee on Intelligence Brett Freedman, as well as U.S. Representatives Bill Keating and Martin "Marty" Meehan (Meehan served in the House from 1993 to 2007, and is currently president of University of Massachusetts), and the late Congressman Joe Moakley (1973–2001). Several members of the Rhode Island House of Representatives are Suffolk Law alumni, including current Speaker of the House Joe Shekarchi and Senate Majority Leader Michael McCaffrey.

Alumni of the school also serve as district attorneys, including Jonathan Blodgett of Essex County, Massachusetts, Timothy Cruz of Plymouth County, Massachusetts, Michael Morrissey of Norfolk County, Massachusetts, and Thomas Quinn of Bristol County, Massachusetts.

Anthony J. Benedetti, Chief Counsel of the Committee for Public Counsel Services; Jennifer Sellitti, Public Defender of New Jersey; and former Massachusetts Secretary of Public Safety and Security Andrea Cabral are also alumni.

=== Military ===
Suffolk alumni have served in a variety of roles in the military. Notable examples include:

- Mike Dumont (Ret.) Vice Admiral of the U.S. Navy, Deputy Commander of the U.S. Northern Command, and Vice Commander of the U.S. Element of the NORAD.
- Carol M. Lynch (Ret.) Rear Admiral, Deputy Judge Advocate General of the Navy for Reserve Affairs and Operations, and Deputy Commander of the Naval Legal Service Command
- Philip McGovern, Lieutenant Colonel and Strategic Plans & Policy Officer of the Massachusetts National Guard and the Joint Staff, Strategy, Policy & Plans for Pol-Mil Affairs: Europe, NATO and Russia, Department of Defense
- Robert E. Reed (Ret.) Chief of the United States Military Justice Division, United States Air Force.

=== Corporate and nonprofit ===
Many alumni are in-house counsel at notable companies and organizations. These include Scott Gerwin, senior counsel for Google, Inc; C.M. Tokë Vandervoort, chief legal officer of the Environmental Defense Fund; Debra Milasincic, senior vice president of Intellectual Property for Moderna; Deborah Marson, executive vice president, general counsel and secretary of Iron Mountain; Matt Penarczyk, head of legal (Americas) for social media platform TikTok; John "Jay" Tangney, executive vice president and general counsel, Suffolk Construction Company; and Michelle M. Garvin, executive vice president and system general counsel and chief of staff at Boston Children's Hospital.

Health Law Advocates' executive director Matt Selig, and Setti Warren, executive director of the Harvard Kennedy School Institute of Politics and former mayor of Newton, Massachusetts, are also graduates of Suffolk Law. Warren was the first African-American to be elected mayor in Massachusetts through the popular vote.

=== Sports industry lawyers ===
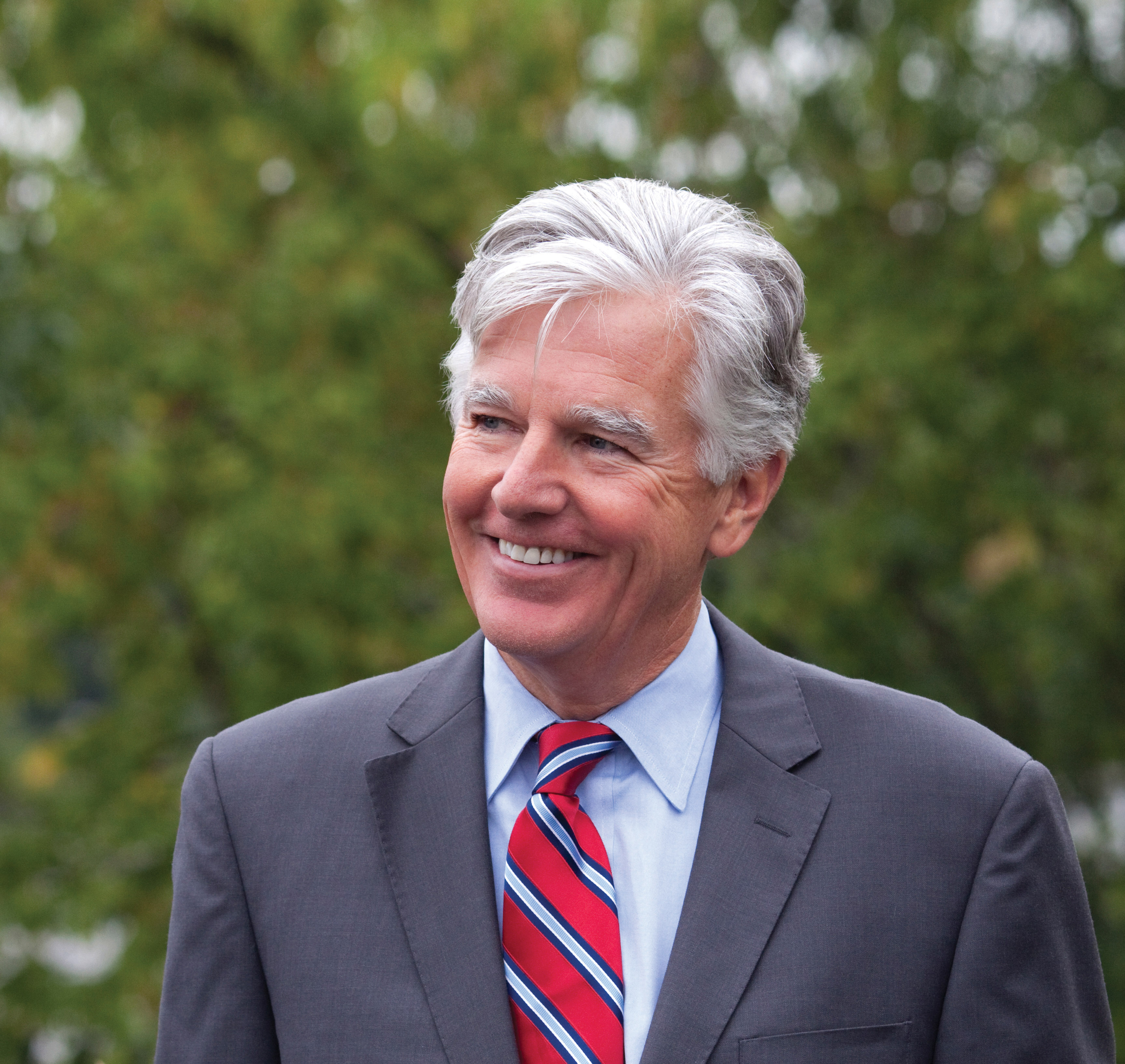
Marty Meehan, President of the University of Massachusetts

Suffolk Law graduates working in the sports industry include Larry Ferazani, General Counsel for the National Football League; R. Stanton Dodge, Chief Legal Officer of DraftKings; David Duquette, Assistant General Manager for the Charlotte Hornets; Jill Kelley, Vice President of Legal Affairs for the New York Jets; Mandy Petrillo, Senior Club Counsel for the Boston Red Sox; Kim Miale, Roc Nation Sports NFL agent and general counsel; Kristen Kuliga, Principal and Founder of K Sports & Entertainment LLC.

=== Academia ===
Many alumni of Suffolk Law have become heads of universities, such as Marty Meehan, president of University of Massachusetts, John D. Keenan, president of Salem State University, and Jo Ann Rooney, president of Loyola University Chicago. David Sargent served as president of Suffolk University.

Suffolk Law professor and legal scholar Joseph Glannon authored the nationally famous Glannon Guide to Civil Procedure.

== Notable faculty and trustees ==
- Steven Ferrey, professor of law
- Joseph Glannon, professor of law

== Honorary degree recipients and speakers ==
- John F. Kennedy, 35th president of the United States
- Calvin Coolidge, 30th president of the United States
- William Rehnquist, chief justice of the U.S. Supreme Court
- Stephen Breyer, associate justice of the U.S. Supreme Court
- Antonin Scalia, associate justice of the U.S. Supreme Court
- Ruth Bader Ginsburg, associate justice of the U.S. Supreme Court
- Andrew Card, chief of staff to George W. Bush
- Ralph Nader, consumer advocate, Green Party presidential nominee
- Edward Kennedy, U.S. senator from Massachusetts
- Coretta Scott King, civil rights activist
- Edwin Meese III, U.S. attorney general
- Richard Posner, judge, U.S. Court of Appeals
- Rudy Giuliani, mayor of New York City
- Robert S. Mueller III, director of the Federal Bureau of Investigation, special prosecutor for the United States Department of Justice
- Cory Booker, U.S. senator from New Jersey
- Mitt Romney, 2012 Republican candidate for president and governor of Massachusetts
- Chris Matthews, host of MSNBC's Hardball with Chris Matthews

== Suffolk Law School in television, film and literature ==
- The Practice, ABC (1997–2004)—Bobby Donnell is a Suffolk Law alumnus played by Dylan McDermott.
- The Departed (2006)—In the film, Matt Damon plays a Suffolk Law School night student, Colin Sullivan. Parts of the movie were filmed at Suffolk.
- Boston Legal, ABC (2005–2006)—Justin Mentell plays Garrett Wells, a hot-shot attorney who graduated at the top of his class from Suffolk Law.
- The Late George Apley—In this 1937 Pulitzer Prize-winning novel, the gardener's grandson, pensioner of a wealthy family, attends Suffolk Law.

== See also ==
- Suffolk University
- North American Consortium on Legal Education
