= John D. Maguire =

American academic administrator

John David Maguire (August 7, 1932 – October 26, 2018) was an American academic administrator and civil rights activist. He was the president of SUNY Old Westbury and Claremont Graduate University, and was known for his early promotion of diversity in American higher education.
