= Daniel Horowitz =

American lawyer

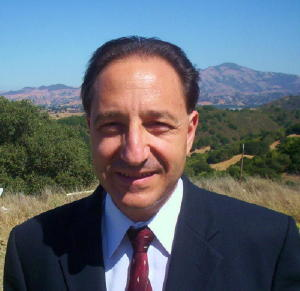
- Born: Daniel Aaron Horowitz; December 14, 1954 (age 71); New York City, New York, U.S.
- Education: Hampshire College (BA); Southwestern University School of Law (JD)
- Occupation: Lawyer
- Spouse(s): Valerie Northup (m. 2007) Pamela Vitale (m. 1994 – died 2005)

Daniel Aaron Horowitz (born December 14, 1954) is an American defense attorney who has represented several high-profile clients including talk show host Michael Savage and is a frequent commentator in the media on criminal cases in the news. In 2014 Horowitz was named a Top 100 Lawyer by the National Trial Lawyers. He is listed as a contributor to Criminal Law, Practice & Procedure. Daniel Horowitz is also a licensed real estate broker. Since 2017 Daniel Horowitz has been an SEC registered investment advisor associated with Meridian Investment Counsel, Inc..

== Background ==
Horowitz was born in New York City. He received his Bachelor of Arts from Hampshire College. In 1980, he earned his Juris Doctor (J.D.) from Southwestern Law School in Los Angeles, California. He was admitted by the State Bar of California that same year. He is a Certified Specialist in Criminal Law (the State Bar of California). Horowitz married Valerie Northup, his third wife, in June, 2007. Horowitz and Northrup had a son, Isaac Aaron, in April, 2009.

== Media ==
Horowitz became a national media personality when he became a regular television commentator during the 2004 Scott Peterson trial. Since the Peterson trial, Horowitz has been a commentator on other high-profile cases such as the Michael Jackson trial, the Melissa Huckaby trial in Tracy, California, and the Anna Nicole Smith case. He has appeared as a regular legal commentator on CNN, MSNBC and Fox News. In 2015, Horowitz was a commentator on the Orville Fleming case involving a California Fire Chief who killed his girlfriend and claimed that he was a "zombie" at the time of the killing and therefore was not guilty of premeditated murder. Horowitz was skeptical of the defense and the defendant was convicted. Daniel Horowitz was part of the Pfizer vaccine study and he strongly supported the safety and importance of the vaccination. Horowitz was featured on NBC and ABC news and was quoted by ABC's Kate Larson saying, "all reputable scientists say that it's safe and it's been proven safe in the trials. Take a little risk, be brave, and save your neighbor down the street."

Horowitz represented Dr. Rebecca Parish, a doctor who vaccinated over 500 senior citizens against the coronavirus in mid January 2021. Complaints were made asserting that people not qualified received the vaccines and the clinic was suspended. Horowitz corrected this and cleared the doctor. The clinic's access to vaccines was restored.

== Notable cases ==
In 1999, Horowitz represented Sean Twomey, in what the Bureau of Alcohol, Tobacco & Firearms claimed was running the "nation's largest black-market weapons trafficking case. A decade later (2012), Horowitz criticized the federal government's Mexican based gun investigation called "fast & furious", where real weapons were sold to gangs so that the federal government could trace the weapons flow. Horowitz claimed that the publicity was political and the scope of the case was blown out of proportion.

In December 2007, Horowitz filed suit in federal district court on behalf of radio talk show host Michael Savage against the Council on American-Islamic Relations, alleging copyright infringement and a violation of federal racketeering laws for using excerpts of Savage's radio program to criticize him and the content of his show. In its 21-page opinion issued on July 25, 2008, the Court noted that: "The audio clip at issue in this dispute was taken from the two-hour long Savage Nation program that aired on October 29, 2007, in which it is undisputed that plaintiff said the following, among other things, about Muslims and about CAIR: (1) “I don’t want to hear one more word about Islam. Take your religion and shove it up your behind.” (2) “They need deportation . . . .You can take [CAIR] and throw them out of my country.” (3) “You can take your due process and shove it . . . .” (4) “[I]ts Muslims screaming for the blood of Christians or Jews or anyone they hate.” (5) “[Islam], a religion that teaches convert or kill, a religion that says oppress women, kill homosexuals . . . .” (6) “The Quran is a document of slavery and chattel.” " In dismissing Savage's copyright infringement claim, the federal court held that the Council on American-Islamic Relations' use of Savage's copyrighted radio excerpts was a protected fair use under copyright law and that Savage's racketeering claim (that depended on the copyright infringement allegation) was without merit. In a second case Horowitz filed on behalf of Savage in 2012, Savage won his case against syndicator TRN and released Savage from his contract with that network.

Horowitz represents San Francisco Police officer Andrew Cohen in Cohen's personal injury lawsuit against San Francisco Mayor Gavin Newsom and police chief Heather Fong. This lawsuit arises out of Cohen's so called comedy video tape that led to the "VideoGate" controversy.

Horowitz also represented Kimberly Bell, the former girlfriend of San Francisco Giants slugger, Barry Bonds. Bell testified against Bonds before the Grand Jury that later indicted Bonds for perjury arising out of his denial of steroid use. Horowitz also represented Steve Williams, the man who ended up with Barry Bonds' 700th home run baseball. Various other fans claimed that they were entitled to the ball. Horowitz won the case and the ball sold for $ 804,000 at auction.

Horowitz's defense of husband killer Susan Polk was portrayed on Dateline NBC.

Horowitz also represented Dr. Wilmer Origel, a chiropractor who was accused of 11 felony charges, of practicing anesthesiology without a medical license, money laundering, and insurance and workers' compensation fraud totaling $5 million. The case became controversial because Horowitz's legal fees were paid by local taxpayers once his client ran out of money to pay for his own representation. Many felt Horowitz's bill would rapidly deplete county funds that were "used to pay local attorneys who represent criminal defendants too poor to hire lawyers themselves." Horowitz argued that the fees paid to appointed attorneys in Stockton were so low that it almost guaranteed that the clients would receive substandard representation and won the battle over fees. The jury hung, 10–2, for acquittal and all charges were later dismissed. The same issue arose in 2019 when Horowitz sought appointment to represent a physical therapist against fraud charges and he asked for $750 per hour in fees.

Martin Garbus and Horowitz had mixed results on a case involving author Terry McMillan ("How Stella Got Her Groove Back") who sued her ex-husband for $40 million. The Court of Appeal ruled that McMillan could proceed in her lawsuit against her ex-husband for his alleged misconduct at the time of their divorce but could not proceed against his attorney who they alleged used television publicity to force a settlement of the divorce. Horowitz and Garbus represented the authors of the book, "The Muslim Mafia" in a federal lawsuit filed against the authors by the target of the book, the organization called "CAIR"

In 2016, Horowitz represented former Pittsburg, California, police officer, Wade Derby who exposed how the department falsified crime statistics by systematically reporting criminal conduct as suspicious circumstances. This lowered the crime statistics and made the department appear to be doing a better job than it was. On July 6, 2016, a New York Times article followed the current status of Horowitz' client, Pavel Lazarenko, the former Prime Minister of Ukraine. The article described how Horowitz and a team of lawyers were fighting the United States government over millions of dollars that were seized as part of the criminal prosecution of Lazarenko more than 15 years ago.

In a 2016 case, Horowitz represented the founder of a white prison gang (Coby Phillips). Phillips read Elie Wiesel's book Night about Wiesel's Holocaust experiences, and he was so moved that he renounced his swastika tattoos and ordered his group members to stop using that symbol. In March 2018, that prosecutor left the district attorney's office and went into practice with Horowitz.

In March 2017, police were called when radio show host, Michael Savage was thrown to the ground outside of a Marin County restaurant. Savage had been a vocal supporter of Donald Trump and Horowitz represented Savage telling the press that he was investigating "whether it had anything to do his client’s political views and his support of Trump".

In June 2020, Horowitz filed civil rights lawsuits on behalf of three men who were arrested by the Richmond, California police department. Horowitz claimed that the men had verbally criticized the police but were acting within their 1st Amendment rights. The third man was arrested when he pushed an officer off the back of his brother. A video of the incident supported Horowitz' clients. Two weeks later all criminal charges were dismissed by the district attorney who said "“Our decision was made after a careful and thorough review of submitted evidence, including body worn camera video and police reports,” Becton said. “The complete breadth of evidence revealed that we could not in good faith proceed with the criminal prosecution against these men.” (Diane Becton, District Attorney)

On January 13, 2022 Horowitz sued John Muir Health, a hospital that the New York Times cited as having the highest reimbursement rates in the country. He sued on behalf of Dr. Alicia Kalamas who alleged that the hospital pursued profit over the safety of patients. The lawsuit cited numerous instances of patient deaths due to the hospital's misconduct. It also asserted that the hospital profited from its lower standard of care as the hospital billed when patients were readmitted even when the hospital was at fault. in one part of the lawsuit it was alleged that the hospital billed millions for patients who were readmitted because the hospital had failed to prescribe a stool softener for patients who were discharged with a prescription of opiates. Most seriously the lawsuit cited the death of a child during surgery after Dr. Kalamas had warned John Muir Health that it was not qualified to do this particular type of surgery.

On April 6, 2022 Horowitz sued John Muir Health on behalf of Tom and Truc-Co Jong whose 2 year old daughter Ailee died when she was having complex liver surgery at the hospital. The lawsuit says that John Muir Health had been warned by doctors in its own system that the facility was not qualified to handle this type of surgery and that the child was in serious danger. The warnings were rejected and the surgery proceeded. Ailee died in surgery. The lawsuit alleges that profit drove the decision to proceed with the surgery. The story was extensively covered in the San Francisco Chronicle. On April 15, 2022 the Medical Board for the State of California announced that they were launching an investigation of the death of Ailee Jong. On May 12, 2023 the California Department of Public Health found serious violations and barred John Muir Health from treating seriously ill children until they made necessary changes.

In 2024 Daniel Horowitz represented members of the Alameda County District attorney's office who were seeking to recall Pamela Price who some considered to be extreme in her political beliefs. He accused Pamela Price of voter intimidation for threatening arrest to members of the district attorney's office who supported the recall.[ Pamela Price was recalled in an election held in November of 2024.

== Marriage to Pamela Vitale ==
Horowitz met Pamela Vitale when she worked in Hollywood as an independent movie producer. He had written a screenplay about one of his cases and was shopping it around. They married in 1994.

On October 15, 2005, he found his wife dead at their home in Lafayette where the couple had lived since they were married. At the time, Horowitz was defending Susan Polk in her murder trial. Two days after the murder, Horowitz was interviewed by MSNBC anchor Dan Abrams who reported that Horowitz said "his wife—quote—'fought like hell,' as indicated by defensive wounds on her body." A local 16-year-old boy, Scott Dyleski, was arrested within days; he was convicted of killing Pamela Vitale and sentenced to life imprisonment without the possibility of parole in 2006. Scott Dyleski's mother was also arrested and charged with covering up the murder. On June 9, 2016, federal judge Susan Illston rejected Dyleski's claims of innocence and ineffective assistance of counsel. In rejecting claims of prejudice, Judge Illston stated that the prosecutor properly argued that: "I hope you remember that as you are reflecting on the evidence in this case, that she is about as innocent a victim as you can have in a criminal case," and by characterizing Vitale as "a woman that virtually everybody in that neighborhood loved or certainly liked."
