= Jacob Staub =

American rabbi, author, and poet

Jacob J. Staub is a rabbi, author and poet. In 1977 he was ordained as a rabbi at the Reconstructionist Rabbinical College. He was Academic Dean of the College from 1989 to 2004, and the editor of the Reconstructionist magazine from 1983 to 1989. In 2009 he was Professor of Jewish Philosophy and Spirituality and Chair of the Department of Medieval Jewish Civilization at the Reconstructionist Rabbinic College. He founded at RRC the first program in Jewish Spiritual Direction at a rabbinical seminary. He has written two books on Gersonides' philosophy of creation and Reconstructionist Judaism. He has written essays on Reconstructionist founder Mordecai Kaplan's thought.

== Education and early life ==
Staub received an undergraduate degree from the State University of New York at Old Westbury and a doctorate in religion/religious studies from Temple University in 1980.

== Bibliography ==
- The Creation of the World According to Gersonides (Brown Judaic Studies, 1982)
- Exploring Judaism, A Reconstructionist Approach (Reconstructionist Press, 2000), with Rebecca T. Alpert
- Kaplan and Process Theology, Goldsmith, E.S, Scult, M and Seltzer, R.M. (eds.),The American Judaism of Mordecai M. Kaplan, (New York University Press, 1990.)
