= Shahla S. Sabet =

Iranian and American judge, lawyer (born 1946)

Shahla Sedaghat Sabet
- شهلا صداقت ثابت
- Born: September 25, 1946 (age 80); Tehran, Pahlavi Iran (Iran)
- Education: University of Tehran; University of California, Los Angeles; Claremont Graduate School, Southwestern Law School
- Occupations: Judge, lawyer, educator
- Known for: First Iranian American judge in the State of California

Shahla Sedaghat Sabet (Persian: شهلا صداقت ثابت; born 1946) is an Iranian and American judge, and lawyer. She is the first Iranian American judge in the State of California. She was a judge at the San Bernardino County Superior Court from 1993 until 2013, and she continued to sit as an assigned judge until 2022.

== Life and career ==
Shahla Sedaghat Sabet was born on September 25, 1946, in Tehran, Pahlavi Iran (now Iran). Her grandfather served on the Supreme Court in Iran as a judge.

She attended the University of Tehran; the University of California, Los Angeles (MPA 1972); Claremont Graduate School (PhD 1977); and Southwestern Law School (Juris Doctor, 1985).

In 1985, she was admitted to the State Bar of California. Sabet was a judge at the San Bernardino County Superior Court starting in 1993 and retired in 2013, and she continued to sit as an assigned judge until 2022. She is the first Iranian American judge in the State of California.

In 1994, the California State Assembly named her "Woman of the Year".
