= Don Biederman (attorney) =

American attorney and author

- Born: Donald Ellis Biederman; August 23, 1934
- Died: August 8, 2002 (aged 67)
- Education: Cornell University; Harvard Law School
- Spouse(s): Marna (m. 1962; his death 2002)
- Children: 2
- Military career
- Allegiance: United States
- Branch: United States Army
- Service years: 1959-1962

Donald Ellis Biederman (August 23, 1934 – August 8, 2002) was an American entertainment attorney, prominent music executive, and professor. Biederman has received the Beverly Hills Bar Association's Entertainment Lawyer of the Year. In 2000, Southwestern Law School in Los Angeles established the Donald E. Biederman Entertainment, Media, and Sports Law Institute.

== Early life and education ==
Biederman was born in New York City on August 23, 1934. He attended Cornell University receiving a bachelor’s degree in 1955. He graduated Harvard Law School in 1958.

== Military Service ==
Biederman served as a legal assistance officer with the U.S. Army judge advocate general's corps in Korea and New Jersey from 1959 to 1962.

== Career ==
In 1972, Don Biederman was General Counsel for CBS Records Group, actively involved in anti-piracy discussions. In 1977, he joined ABC Records as Vice President of Legal Affairs and Administration. Following the sale of ABC Records to MCA, Biederman joined Mitchell Silberberg & Knupp as a partner, after which he moved to Warner/Chappell Music as Executive Vice President of Legal and Business Affairs and General Counsel for the next 17 years.

Biederman was present as counsel at Mitchell Silberberg & Knupp and the ITA Copyright Session to give his opinions on the issue of copyright infringement related to emerging technologies.

Biederman co-authored Law & Business of the Entertainment Industries. He edited Legal & Business Problems of the Music Industry.

== American Academy of Dermatology commercial ==
Biederman underwent many surgeries, resulting in the removal of his nose and cheek. He appeared in a skin cancer awareness commercial highlighting the dangers of excessive sun exposure and its consequences, sponsored by the American Academy of Dermatology.

Biederman narrates the advertisement wearing a prosthetic nose to conceal his facial disfigurement, reflecting on his frequent sunburns growing up near the beaches of Long Island, New York. At the conclusion of the commercial, Biederman removes the prosthetic, to reveal the dark cavity where his nose once was, as a warning about the disease's severity.

== Legacy ==
In 1983, Professor Lind, Professor Steven Rood and Adjunct Professor Don Biederman developed the Southwestern Law School’s entertainment law curriculum with the introductions of courses taught by industry experts, international study, and a more specialized Masters of Law program.

In 2000, the National Entertainment and Media Law Institute and Southwestern University School of Law was founded by Biederman, at which time he was appointed director. It was renamed The Donald E. Biederman Entertainment, Media, and Sports Law Institute at Southwestern Law School.

The Donald E. Biederman Legacy Award was created to honor a member of the bar or bench who upholds the highest standards of ethics or professionalism as a leader in entertainment and media law. Honorable recipients of the Donald E. Biederman Legacy Award include Russell Frackman, Robert C. Lind, among them.

== Personal life ==
Biederman was married to his wife, Marna until his death. They had two children. His son, Jeff, is an entertainment attorney who has represented music interests of the Miles Davis estate, Dierks Bentley, and advised on sales and acquisitions for publishing companies Downtown Music Holdings and Round Hill Music Royalty Fund Ltd. His daughter, Melissa, is an attorney and was an assistant attorney general in Des Moines, Iowa, at the time of Don Biederman's death.
