= Southwestern Law School =

Private law school in Los Angeles, California

- Motto: A Landmark in Legal Education
- Established: 1911
- School type: Private law school
- Dean: Darby Dickerson
- Location: Los Angeles, California, U.S.
- Enrollment: 950
- Faculty: 180 total, 69 full-time
- USNWR ranking: 154th (tie) (2025)
- Bar pass rate: 71.4% (February 2024 1st time takers)
- Website: swlaw.edu
- ABA profile: Standard 509 Report

Southwestern Law School is a private law school in Los Angeles, California. It is accredited by the American Bar Association (ABA) and the Western Association of Schools and Colleges (WASC) Senior College and University Commission. The law school annually enrolls nearly 1,000 students. Its campus includes the Bullocks Wilshire building, an Art Deco National Register of Historic Places landmark built in 1929. Southwestern is an independent law school with affiliation to the undergraduate program at California State University, Northridge.

== History ==
Moot court

Southwestern Law School was founded on November 25, 1911, as the Southwestern College of Law. John J. Schumacher, its founder, intended the nonprofit institution to be a law school that reached out to women and minorities. The school is the second oldest law school in Los Angeles. Southwestern received a university charter in 1913 after it expanded to include a number of other disciplines including a business school. Southwestern's first home was in the Union Oil Building in downtown Los Angeles, followed by a small campus on South Hill Street, where it existed for the ensuing decades.

The Great Depression and Second World War took a severe toll on the enrollment, and by the end of the 1930s the law school was the only school that remained. However, as veterans returned home the school experienced a surge of interest, and in 1974, the campus was moved to the school's current location on Westmoreland Avenue in the Wilshire Center area of Los Angeles.

It joined the Association of American Law Schools (AALS) in 1974. It is a member of the North American Consortium on Legal Education.

In 1994, Southwestern acquired the adjacent Bullocks Wilshire building, a historic landmark which was subsequently renovated to house the school's law library, classrooms, faculty offices, and court room and advocacy center. The 1989 Aerosmith music video "Love in an Elevator" was filmed in what is now the law library.

In 2024, Southwestern Law School's online Juris Doctor program became the first fully-online program to receive accreditation by the American Bar Association.

== Campus ==
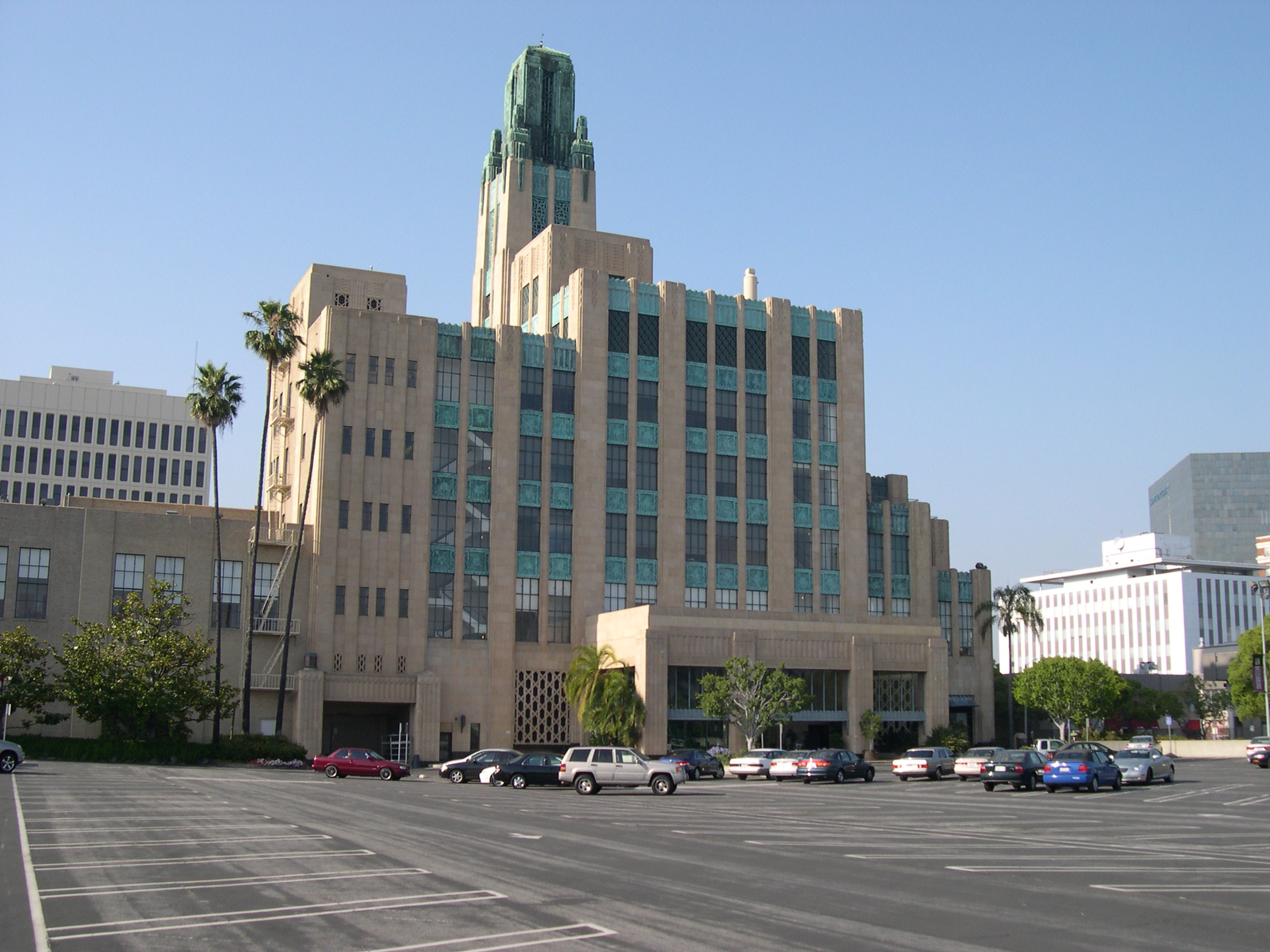
The Bullocks Wilshire Building on the campus of the Southwestern Law School

The campus is in the Koreatown area of the Mid-Wilshire district near downtown Los Angeles. The campus comprises the Westmoreland Building and the Bullocks Wilshire Building. Both house classrooms, administrative offices, and faculty offices. The Bullocks Wilshire Building also houses the Leigh Taylor Law Library (named for a former Dean of the law school), the Julian Dixon Courtroom and Advocacy Center, a fitness center, a dining area, and student lounges.

The Westmoreland Building is a typical campus building, while the Bullocks Wilshire Building is a fully renovated art deco landmark restored to its 1929 state, from the clocks on the walls to the "showcases" in the library.

At over 83,000 square feet (7,700 m^{2}) and featuring over 470,000 volumes, the Leigh H. Taylor Law Library is the second largest academic law library facility in California.

As of fall semester 2013, Southwestern opened student housing "The Residences at 7th", which include 133 units ranging from studio to two bedrooms housing 153 or more students.

== Admissions ==
For the class entering in 2025, Southwestern accepted 36.47% of applicants, with 34.74% of those accepted enrolling. The median enrollee had a 157 LSAT score and 3.51 undergraduate GPA. Seven students were not included in the GPA calculation, and one was not included in the admissions calculation. Its 25th/75th percentile LSAT scores and GPAs reported were 154/160 and 3.23/3.72.

== Bar passage rate and rankings ==
In February 2024 results, 71.4% of Southwestern Law graduates taking the test for the first time passed the California State Bar, vs. 44.8% for all first-time takers and 76% for first-time takers who graduated from ABA-approved law schools in California. Southwestern was ranked 145th in the 2024 U.S. News & World Report "Best Law Schools" rankings. The part-time program was ranked 43rd of 70. Southwestern has been ranked among the top entertainment law schools by The Hollywood Reporter.

== Post-graduation employment ==
According to Southwestern's official 2022 ABA-required disclosures, 62.2% of the Class of 2022 obtained full-time, long-term, JD-required employment nine months after graduation, excluding solo-practitioners.

== Costs ==
Tuition and fees at Southwestern for the 2025–2026 academic year are $63,160 for full-time students and $42,124 for part-time students.

== Curriculum ==
=== Juris Doctor (J.D.) ===
==== Full-time program (3 years) ====
The traditional program is three academic years of full-time study that allows students to pursue a broad-based legal education with opportunities to focus on a particular area of the law, such as: entertainment, criminal, international, business, family, or tax law, among others.

==== Full-time online program (3–4 years) ====
The first of its kind, Southwestern's American Bar Association-approved Online J.D. program features a full-time curriculum featuring primarily asynchronous classes, giving students the flexibility to study according to their own schedule from a convenient location.

==== Part-time programs (4 years) ====
The evening program is four academic years of part-time study designed for working professionals and other students who are unable to devote full-time to the study of law.

===== Part-time day (4 years) =====
The "PLEAS" (Part-time Legal Education Alternative at Southwestern) program is a 4-year part-time day curriculum designed for students with child or elder care responsibilities.

==== SCALE Program (2 years) ====
Established in 1974, Southwestern founded the first two-year J.D. course of study offered at an American Bar Association-approved law school. SCALE (Southwestern's Conceptual Approach to Legal Education) is a unique, accelerated J.D. program. Its intensive schedule is intended to prepare students for the rigors of practicing law. Low student-faculty ratio in the classroom promotes cooperative teaching and intellectual discussion among classmates. The program has a limited enrollment.

=== Study abroad programs ===
Southwestern offers Semester Abroad options that include:

Studying in Canada or Mexico via the North American Consortium on Legal Education; Attending The Hague Law School at The Hague University of Applied Sciences

A Summer Abroad can be spent in London learning international media and entertainment law and international public interest law.

=== Joint degree programs ===
Southwestern has joined forces with the Drucker Graduate School of Management to create dual-degree programs. Students at Southwestern and the Drucker School, part of Claremont Graduate University (CGU), will be able to earn a J.D. and Master of Business Administration (M.B.A.), a J.D. and Master of Arts in management (M.A.M.), or a J.D. and Executive Master of Business Administration (E.M.B.A.). TB.A./J.D. Joint Degree Program

Under a partnership agreement with California State University, Northridge, students will be able to simultaneously earn their Bachelor of Arts and Juris Doctor in six years instead of seven years. Starting in fall 2014, the program enrolls up to 35 incoming CSUN freshmen. Students spend three years completing their undergraduate course requirements; their first year of law school will also count as their fourth year of undergraduate education. Students in the program also receive a $10,000 Wildman/Schumacher entering student scholarship. The scholarship can be renewed provided that a minimum 2.7 GPA is maintained. In order to qualify for the program incoming freshmen must have a minimum 3.0 GPA and have received either a minimum score of 25 on the ACT or 1140 on the SAT. In addition, students in the program must maintain a 3.40 GPA and receive a 156 or higher on the LSAT. According to Dean Austen Parrish, the program will help young, promising undergraduate students pursue a legal education.

=== Master of Laws (LL.M.) ===
==== General studies ====
Southwestern offers an individualized LL.M. program for students who have already earned a law degree and are interested in furthering their legal education. The program allows students to choose their own focus of study, from American Legal Systems to International Law to Technology Innovation and Commercialization.

=== Advocacy training ===
In 2006, Southwestern was awarded a federal grant to train Mexican lawyers and law faculty in advocacy skills as part of a USAID effort to assist Mexican legal reform.

== Publications ==
=== Southwestern Law Review ===
Law Review is a student-edited quarterly journal that publishes scholarly articles and commentary on a variety of legal issues in California and federal law contributed by prominent jurists, practitioners, law professors, and student members of the Law Review staff. Annual Symposia and the Distinguished Lecture Series are sponsored by Law Review. These programs feature prominent members of the legal community lecturing on areas of legal expertise and participating in panel discussions on relevant emerging and contemporary legal issues.

=== Southwestern Journal of International Law ===
Formerly the Southwestern Journal of Law and Trade in the Americas, the journal focuses on issues of international law and trade, publishing scholarly articles and notes exploring areas such as international insolvency, environmental law, international trade issues, NAFTA, international arbitration, privatization in Central and South American countries, immigration, human rights, and international crime. On October 3, 2008, the Southwestern Journal of International Law hosted one of the first U.S. conferences on Arctic sovereignty, featuring legal scholars from both the United States and Canada.

=== Journal of International Media & Entertainment Law ===
In association with the American Bar Association Forum on Communications Law and Forum on Entertainment and Sports Industries, the Journal of International Media & Entertainment Law explores the complex and unsettled legal issues surrounding the creation and distribution of media and entertainment products on a worldwide basis, which necessarily implicate the laws, customs, and practices of multiple jurisdictions. Additionally, it examines the impact of the Internet and other technologies, the often conflicting laws affecting those issues, and the legal ramifications of widely divergent cultural views of privacy, defamation, intellectual property, and government regulation.

== Clinical programs ==
The law school has nine clinical programs and two practicum programs.

== Notable people ==
=== Alumni ===
Southwestern's 10,000 alumni include public officials as well as founders of law firms and general counsels of corporations.

==== Politics and government ====
- Tom Bradley, 38th Mayor of Los Angeles (1973–93)
- Patricia Cafferata, first woman Nevada State Treasurer, (1983–1987)
- Murray Chotiner, political strategist, campaign manager for Richard M. Nixon
- Marcia Clark, lead prosecutor in the O. J. Simpson murder case (1995)
- Julian Dixon, California State Assembly (1973–78), U.S. House of Representatives (1979–2000)
- Denise Moreno Ducheny, California State Assembly (1994–2000), California State Senate (2003–present)
- Matt Fong, California State Treasurer (1995–99)
- Jim Gibbons, 28th Governor of Nevada (2007–11), U.S. House of Representatives (1997–2006)
- Cynthia B. Hall, New Mexico Public Regulation Commission (2017–present)
- James O. Page, Father of Emergency Medical Services, Battalion Chief, Los Angeles County Fire Department (1959–1975)
- Bill Paparian, Pasadena City Council (1987–99) including serving as 52nd Mayor of Pasadena, California (1995–97), Green Party nominee for the U.S. House of Representatives (2006)
- Robert Philibosian, 38th Los Angeles County District Attorney (1981–84)
- Norris Poulson, California State Assembly (1939–43), 36th Mayor of Los Angeles (1954–61)
- Ira Reiner, 39th Los Angeles County District Attorney (1984–92)
- Edward R. Roybal, Los Angeles City Council (1949–62), U.S. House of Representatives (1963–93)
- Gordon H. Smith, U.S. Senate (1997–2009)

==== Judiciary ====
- Stanley Mosk, former Justice of the California Supreme Court
- Ronald S. W. Lew, United States District Court for the Central District of California
- Paul Peek, former Justice of the California Supreme Court
- Shahla S. Sabet (JD, 1985), the first Iranian American judge in the State of California; judge at the San Bernardino County Superior Court (1993–2013)
- Vaino Spencer, first African-American woman judge in California
- Otis D. Wright II, United States District Court for the Central District of California

==== Entertainment industry ====
- Jean Casarez, Court TV correspondent
- Erin M. Jacobson, attorney
- Staci Keanan, actress (enrolled under her real name, Anastasia Sagorsky, and later joined the school as an adjunct faculty member)
- Kevin A. Ross, host and producer on America's Court with Judge Ross
- Camille Vasquez, attorney in Depp v. Heard defamation lawsuit

==== Sports industry ====
- Chris Bahr, Olympian, NFL kicker
- Jeff Borris, sports agent
- Donald Sterling, former owner of the NBA Los Angeles Clippers

==== Legal practice ====
- Roslyn Chasan, women's rights attorney, judge pro-tempore, won largest settlement in history of Palos Verdes
- William John Cox, public interest attorney (Holocaust denial case and publication of Dead Sea Scrolls), author and political activist
- Daniel Horowitz, high-profile defense attorney and legal analyst
- Daniel M. Petrocelli, partner, O'Melveny & Myers. Notable clients include Fred Goldman and Jeffrey Skilling
- Stefani Schaeffer, defense attorney and winner of Donald Trump's The Apprentice 6
- Marvin Mitchelson, high-profile divorce attorney and celebrity lawyer who pioneered the concept of palimony
- Vicki Roberts, attorney, on-air legal commentator, television and film personality
- Shawn Holley, high-profile criminal defense attorney, civil litigator and legal analyst. Notable clients include O. J. Simpson, Michael Jackson, Tupac Shakur, Geronimo Pratt, Snoop Dogg, Reggie Bush, Lindsay Lohan, Paris Hilton and Kim Kardashian.
- Camille Vasquez, high-profile attorney specialized on plaintiff-side defamation suits. Notable clients include Johnny Depp

==== Authors ====
- Richard T. Williamson, nonfiction author of books on asset protection, estate planning, and capital gains tax planning
- Kenneth G. Eade, fiction author of legal thriller and spy fiction

==== Religion ====
- Howard W. Hunter, 14th President of The Church of Jesus Christ of Latter-day Saints

=== Faculty ===
==== Deans ====
- Darby Dickerson (2021–)
- Susan Westerberg Prager (2013–2021)
- Austen L. Parrish (2012–2013)
- Bryant G. Garth (2005–2012)
- Leigh H. Taylor (1978-2005)
- Dean C. Boyack (1977 - 1978)
- Paul W. Wildman (1968 - 1977)
- Ignatius F. Parker (1959 - 1968)
- Orville P. Cockerill (1946 - 1959)
- Neil G. McCarroll (1940 - 1946)
- Rollin L. McNitt (1920 - 1940)
- Arthur J. Abbott (1915 - 1920)
- Hugh Evander Willis (1913 - 1915)
- John J. Schumacher (1911 - 1913)

==== Current ====
- John Heilman - Professor of Law, Director of Critical Race, Gender and Sexuality Studies Concentration
- Faisal Kutty - Professor of Law
- Kevin J. Greene - John J. Schumacher Chair, Professor of Law. "Professor Greene's scholarship has garnered national and international recognition in the area of intellectual property (“IP”) law, particularly his pioneering work on African-American music and inequality in copyright law."

==== Former faculty ====
- Christopher Darden, prosecutor in the O. J. Simpson murder case
- James Rogan, California Orange County Superior Court judge. From 1997 to 2001, he was a former Republican member of the House of Representatives who was a House Manager in the Senate impeachment trial of Bill Clinton.
- Don Biederman, entertainment lawyer and professor who founded the National Entertainment and Media Law Institute and Southwestern University School of Law.
