= Susan Polk =

American woman convicted of second degree murder

Susan Polk (born Susan Mae Bolling on January 25, 1957) is an American woman convicted on June 16, 2006 of second degree (unpremeditated) murder for the 2002 death of her husband Dr. Frank "Felix" Polk. Polk's trial, described by one correspondent as "circus-like", drew extensive media attention with its sensationalist elements.

Her case is featured on the show Deadly Sins, and the episode is titled "Deadly Desire".

== Background ==
Susan Polk met Dr. Polk, a psychotherapist, in 1972 when administrators at her high school recommended she see him to treat her panic attacks and for ditching classes to go home and read Russian classics. Susan Polk later made the "undisputed" claim that Dr. Polk first had sex with her when she was 16 and still under his treatment, a violation of professional ethics in the relationship between therapist and patient, which is now illegal in California. At the time, Dr. Polk had a wife and two children, but the couple divorced in 1982.

After graduating from high school, Polk attended Mills College and San Francisco State University, graduating magna cum laude. In 1982, she married Dr. Polk, who was then an instructor at the California Graduate School of Family Psychology and an occasional consultant as well as a private practitioner. At the time of their wedding, Polk was age 24 and her husband age 50. During their marriage, the couple had three sons. In 2001, Susan Polk filed for divorce, a complicated and contentious proceeding during which each contacted police with allegations of domestic violence. When asked by police whether Ms. Polk had made threats or been violent, Mr. Polk said she hadn't. In 2002, while Susan was living in Montana with her 2 minor sons, the sons returned to California and lived with their dad, therefore Dr. Polk was able to petition the courts, ex parte, without providing Ms. Polk any form of official notice in advance, for reduced temporary alimony and child support. The courts then granted Dr. Polk sole custody of the couple's 2 minor sons and sharply reduced Susan's temporary alimony and child support from $6,500 to $1,500 a month. Dr. Polk also received sole possession of their house.

On Wednesday, October 9, Susan went to the home to retrieve her belongings and complete her dental procedure by having a permanent crown put on her tooth. On October 11, the eldest son Adam came home from UCLA to pick up his dog. On Sunday, October 13, Dr. Polk, Adam, and the youngest son drove Adam and the dog back to UCLA. Dr. Polk and the youngest son returned home at around 9:30 pm. Dr. Polk, then 70, was found dead the following night, Monday, October 14, 2002, by his 15-year-old son who called 911.

== The trial ==
At trial, prosecutors sought a conviction of murder in the first degree, contending that Susan Polk planned the murder of her multimillionaire husband for money. Susan Polk claimed self-defense, asserting that, after years of abuse, beginning with his therapy sessions, in which Dr. Polk performed "guided visualizations" (i.e., hypnosis), he brandished a kitchen knife against her. She stated that she took control of the weapon and stabbed him instead. As an expert witness for the defense, forensic pathologist Dr. John Cooper testified that Felix Polk's death was caused by heart disease and that his stab wounds were not life-threatening and were evidence that Susan Polk delivered them in self-defense. Dr. Cooper failed to appear in court the following day to continue being cross-examined and to present documents he claimed to have received from Susan Polk, sending a written explanation to the judge. He returned with the letters a week later to resume testimony. Prosecuting attorneys dismissed Susan Polk's claim, arguing that she had no defensive wounds from her husband's alleged attack, which was disputed by expert testimony for the defense from Dr. Cooper.

The court was forced to declare a mistrial when the wife of Susan Polk's then-counsel Daniel Horowitz was murdered in an unrelated incident. Susan fired her attorneys to represent herself. She supported her defense with allegations of a history of marital and professional misconduct, including claims that Dr. Felix Polk had drugged and raped her when she was a teenager, brainwashed the couple's children, and threatened to kill her if she tried to leave him. Susan Polk repeatedly requested a second mistrial, lodging accusations of conspiracy against the prosecutor and the judge.

Each of Susan and Felix's children testified at the trial. The youngest son, who had found the body, testified that his mother had speculated about means of killing her husband in the weeks before his father's death. The oldest son, Adam, also testified against his mother, receiving widespread media coverage when he referred to her on the stand as "cuckoo for Cocoa Puffs". The middle son, Eli, testified on Susan's behalf, that Felix was the aggressor, controller, manipulator and that he was responsible overall.

Initially, jurors were deadlocked 11-1 guilty of first degree murder with the lone holdout juror believing the verdict should be manslaughter. The lone juror's position was that the sentence of 25-years-to-life for first degree murder was too harsh and didn't want to send Polk to prison for that length of time and believed that the 11-year fixed sentence for manslaughter was more appropriate. Eventually, a compromised verdict was reached with the lone holdout juror agreeing to come up from manslaughter to second degree murder and the remaining 11 jurors agreeing to come down from first degree murder to second degree murder to reach a unanimous verdict. The penalty for second degree murder is 15-years-to-life. Susan Polk was sentenced to a prison term of 16-years-to-life with the additional 1-year for use of a deadly weapon; knife. Susan Polk was transferred from Contra Costa County to the California Institution for Women (CIW), a dorm-like prison, in Corona, California on February 27, 2007.

Susan Polk's appeal was denied by the California Supreme Court on March 30, 2011.

Polk became eligible for parole in 2018 but the hearing was postponed and her first parole hearing was held on May 29, 2019. Susan Polk was removed from her parole hearing before it concluded for being disruptive by repeatedly talking over the parole board commissioners, attempting to enter over 100 objections before the parole hearing began, and for attempting to retry the facts of the case. Polk also accused one of the commissioners of throwing a document at Polk which the commissioner denied doing. Polk was denied parole for an additional 10 years. Her request to advance her parole hearing earlier than 10 years was denied on July 29, 2025. Polk will be eligible for her next parole hearing in May 2029.
