= Journal of High Technology Law =

- Discipline: Technology law, intellectual property
- Language: English
- Edited by: Alexandra Conn

Publication details
- History: 2002–present
- Publisher: Suffolk University Law School
- Frequency: Biannually

Standard abbreviations
- Bluebook: J. High Tech. L.
- ISO 4: J. High Technol. Law

Indexing
- ISSN: 1536-7983
- LCCN: 2001215552
- OCLC no.: 56209148

Links
- Journal homepage

The Journal of High Technology Law is one of five law journals at Suffolk University Law School publishing articles, blogs, and book reviews covering subjects related to technology law. It was established in 1998 and became Suffolk's fourth honor board law journal in 2001. In Washington and Lee University's 2017 rankings of law journals with the highest impact factor, the journal was ranked 7th among law journals specializing in Science, Technology and Computing, 8th among law journals specializing in Intellectual Property, and was ranked 148th among all 1,549 United States law journals.
