= State University of New York at Old Westbury =

Public university in Old Westbury, New York, US

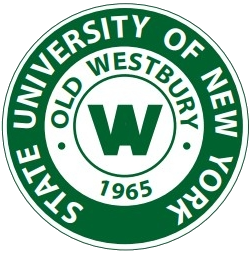
- Former name: State University of New York College at Old Westbury (1965–2023)
- Motto: "Own Your Future"
- Type: Public university
- Established: 1965; 61 years ago
- Parent institution: State University of New York
- President: Timothy E. Sams
- Provost: David Lanoue
- Students: 4,948 (fall 2025)
- Undergraduates: 4,478 (fall 2025)
- Postgraduates: 470 (fall 2025)
- Location: Old Westbury, New York, U.S. 40.7993°N 73.5741°W
- Campus: 605 acres (245 ha); Suburban
- Colors: Green & ivory
- Nickname: Panthers
- Sporting affiliations: NCAA Division III Skyline
- Mascot: OWWIN the Panther
- Website: oldwestbury.edu

The State University of New York at Old Westbury (SUNY at Old Westbury) is a public university in Old Westbury, New York, United States, with portions in the neighboring town of Jericho. It enrolls just over 5,000 students.

== History ==
The State University of New York at Old Westbury was founded in 1965 as the "State University of New York College at Old Westbury" by the State University of New York (SUNY) Board of Trustees. It began in 1968 at Planting Fields, the former Coe Estate and arboretum in Oyster Bay, New York. In 1971, the university moved to its present Old Westbury site in Nassau County, Long Island – an estate, known as "Broad Hollow," formerly owned by agriculturist, industrialist, sportsman and philanthropist F. Ambrose Clark.

The first president of the Old Westbury campus college was John D. Maguire, who had been a religion professor at Wesleyan University and a civil rights activist. He aimed to create a university devoted to social justice and racial equality.

In 1986, L. Eudora Pettigrew became president of Old Westbury, becoming the first African-American college president in the SUNY system.

In 2023, the college gained status as a university, becoming the "State University of New York at Old Westbury".

== Academics ==
Undergraduate demographics as of Fall 2023
Race and ethnicity	Total
Hispanic	32%
Black	25%
White	24%
Asian	12%
International student	4%
Two or more races	3%
Unknown	1%
Economic diversity
Low-income (Note: The percentage of students who received an income-based federal Pell grant intended for low-income students.)	49%
Affluent (Note: The percentage of students who are a part of the American middle class at the bare minimum.)	51%

There are over 50 degree programs available at the university.

Of the university's 166 full-time professors, approximately 80% hold the highest degree in their discipline. Eight members of the faculty have been named Distinguished Teaching or Service Professors by the State University of New York, which are among the highest ranks available in the university system.

Academic offerings are housed in four schools.

- School of Arts and Sciences
- School of Business at SUNY-Old Westbury which is accredited by the Association to Advance Collegiate Schools of Business (AACSB)
- School of Education
- School of Professional Studies which offers evening, online, hybrid, and weekend courses

== Athletics ==
SUNY Old Westbury athletics wordmark

SUNY Old Westbury teams, named the Panthers, participate as a member of the National Collegiate Athletic Association's Division III. The Panthers are a member of the Skyline Conference. Men's sports include baseball, basketball, cross country, golf, soccer and volleyball; while women's sports include basketball, cross country, lacrosse, soccer, softball and volleyball.

=== Athletic facilities ===
The F. Ambrose Clark Physical Education & Recreation Center, also known as the Clark Athletic Center, houses a 25-meter swimming pool; a gymnasium with seating for 2,000; a strength and conditioning facility; and an aerobic workout room with physical fitness accessories.

The Clark Center is a venue for the Nassau County, New York, high school men's basketball playoffs as well as some women's tournament games. The events are shown on local Cablevision TV outlets News 12 Long Island and Telecare. Other Nassau high school basketball events are staged at the C.W. Post Campus of Long Island University's Pratt Center, north of the Clark Center in the neighboring region of Brookville, New York.

The neighboring Jackie Robinson Athletic Complex, dedicated in 2006, adjoins the Clark Center. It includes a baseball stadium and softball field. The baseball stadium seatings more than 1,000 fans, and a press box is available for game announcers and media personnel.

The university features two soccer fields, eight tennis courts, and two outdoor recreational basketball courts. Runners in cross country competition train on European-styled courses that traverse Old Westbury's 604-acre (2.44 km^{2}) wooded campus.

== Notable alumni ==
- Kevin J. Greene, lawyer and law professor
- A. Tom Grunfeld, sinologist
- Craig S. Harris, jazz musician
- Kool Moe Dee, rapper and MC
- David Liederman, chef and businessman
- John McTiernan, film producer
- Andrea Navedo, actress
- Lester Prosper, basketball player
- Andrew P. Schafer Jr., US Army major general
- Jacob Staub, rabbi and author
