= Scott Dyleski =

American murderer (born 1988)

- Born: Scott Edgar Dyleski; October 30, 1988 (age 37); San Francisco, California, United States
- Status: Incarcerated in Salinas Valley State Prison
- Conviction: First-degree murder
- Penalty: Life imprisonment (25 years to life)

Scott Edgar Dyleski (born October 30, 1988) is an American murderer, convicted of murdering his neighbor, Pamela Vitale, the wife of prominent attorney Daniel Horowitz. He received the maximum penalty allowed by the law, life in prison without parole. As a juvenile at the time of the murder, he did not qualify for the death penalty. The murder was committed on October 15, 2005, when Dyleski was 16 years old. He is currently serving his sentence in California State Prison, Corcoran. In 2018, Dyleski's sentence was reduced to 25 years to life in prison, after the state of California passed Senate Bill 394, which gives juveniles tried as adults and sentenced to life without parole a chance for eventual freedom. He will be eligible for parole in 2030.

== Background ==
Dyleski was born in San Francisco, California to Kenneth Dyleski and Esther Fielding. His parents separated when he was two years old, and Dyleski was raised by his mother. During elementary school, Dyleski moved with his mother to Lafayette, California, and began living in the home of another family, with whom they had long been friends. Dyleski attended Lafayette public schools, including Acalanes High School, where he dressed in uncommon clothing such as trench coats and was described as "a nice kid" by a fellow student.

== Murder ==
On October 15, 2005, Dyleski's neighbor Pamela Vitale was found murdered in her home. She was found lying in the entryway just inside the front door and had been bludgeoned and eviscerated. Five days later, on October 20, 2005, Dyleski was arrested on suspicion of committing the murder.

== Trial ==
Initially, Dyleski was represented by attorney Thomas McKenna. He later asked to be removed from the case, because he defended the driver of a car that killed Dyleski's sister and another passenger in 2002. Dyleski was then represented by Ellen Leonida, a public defender. Dyleski pleaded not guilty.

Investigators believe Dyleski and his friend, Robin Croen, planned to grow marijuana in Scott Dyleski's closet, with Dyleski in charge of raising money, according to Croen, who was granted immunity for testifying. He testified that Dyleski used stolen credit card information belonging to his neighbors in order to purchase lighting equipment. Croen also testified that his role in the credit card scam was limited to researching what equipment to order. Croen actually constructed order forms from websites that he claimed he then sent to Dyleski.

According to prosecutors, one of Dyleski's orders used the credit card information for Karen Schneider, but mistakenly used Vitale's address as the address to bill, and his own address as the ship-to address. The lighting company refused to process the order, suspecting it was fraudulent. Dyleski told Croen that he would "take care of it" and, subsequently, he made one more attempt by calling the credit card company.

Authorities believe Dyleski was surprised by Vitale during a burglary of her home. However, Dyleski's girlfriend, Jena Reddy testified at trial that Dyleski had talked about beating and breaking the necks of children and was curious about how the human body would function without certain organs.

Prosecutors stated that Dyleski killed Vitale by striking her numerous times in the head, possibly with a rock, then carved a symbol into her back. During the trial, prosecutor Harold Jewett tried to establish that the symbol found on the victim's back closely resembled the letter "H" in the word "hate" from a bumper sticker reading "I'm for the separation of Church and Hate", which was seized from Dyleski's bedroom.

The coroner's autopsy report describes the marks on Vitale's back as an "H-shaped figure cut into skin of posterior torso" and "3 intersecting superficial incisions... forming an H-shaped pattern with extension". Other reports indicate that the symbol was a Cross of Lorraine.

At the conclusion of the preliminary hearing, judge Mary Ann O'Malley ruled that prosecutors had enough evidence for trial. Dyleski was arraigned on an additional charge of first-degree residential burglary and he entered a new plea of not guilty to all the charges. Dyleski's mother was accused of helping her son destroy evidence, but the charge was dropped under the condition that she testify truthfully. Burglary was not presented as a motive during the trial and, in fact, it was stated that nothing had been taken. At trial, Daniel Horowitz said he had never gone through his wife's financial records to see if anything was amiss.

Jury selection began in July 2006 in the courtroom of judge Barbara Zuniga, who became the trial judge after defense attorney Ellen Leonida made a peremptory challenge against judge Mary Ann O'Malley on the grounds that the jurist was "prejudiced against the interest of the defendant". Attorneys provided contrasting views of Dyleski in their opening statements. Prosecutor Harold Jewett said Dyleski identified with gothic symbols and art that depicted violence and stabbed and beat Vitale. Leonida described her client as a gentle kid whose friends know he is not a killer and instead valued human and animal rights.

During the trial, the Nickelodeon animated television series Invader Zim was cited. The prosecution asserted that the defendant had a fascination with images of body parts. They drew attention to comments he had made after watching the episode "Dark Harvest", in which the alien Zim collects human organs in an attempt to appear more human. Witnesses for the defense said that the comments were made in jest.

At the end of August attorneys gave closing arguments, capping several weeks of testimony. The prosecutor called to the stand Dyleski's housemates, mother, girlfriend, friend, a forensic pathologist, a DNA expert and several criminalists. Lawyer Gloria Allred represented Jena Reddy, Dyleski's girlfriend. She told the jury that while Dyleski never admitted or denied killing his neighbor, he told her he would take the blame to protect her and his best friend. DNA evidence showed Vitale's blood was found on Dyleski's belongings, the DNA of both Vitale and Dyleski was found on the ski mask worn during the murder, and his DNA was found on the bottom of her foot (17 out of 17 markers matched). A shoe print at the murder scene was determined by the jury to match shoes belonging to Dyleski. Jason Kwast, another criminalist, testified that the pattern of bloody footprints found on a plastic lid that was discovered in Vitale's house matched the pattern of the bottom of Land's End shoes belonging to Dyleski. A chilling to-do list was purported to have been written by Dyleski. Leonida called a number of Dyleski's friends to serve as character witnesses. Dyleski exercised his right to remain silent and did not testify. No DNA experts were called to rebut the prosecution's DNA evidence.

== Verdict ==
Scott Dyleski was found guilty of all the charges against him: first-degree murder, the special circumstance of murder in the commission of a first-degree residential burglary, first-degree residential burglary and an enhancement for using a dangerous weapon to bludgeon Vitale. He was sentenced to life in prison without the possibility of parole. He was held in juvenile hall until his 18th birthday on October 30, 2006 (about one month after sentencing) and was then transferred to San Quentin Prison. He was kept out of the general population while his case was evaluated and was then transferred to Kern Valley State Prison several months later. In 2009, the Court of Appeal justices upheld the conviction and noted, "The defendant in this case committed a truly heinous crime. Putting on a dark mask and gloves, and arming himself with a rock and a knife, he invaded the home of a complete stranger to him. Without any provocation, he viciously set upon Pamela Vitale, raining blow after blow on her as she tried to fight him off." The court also noted that even as "Vitale lay motionless and near death, defendant was still not done with her. He put away his rock and pulled out a knife. He pulled Vitale's T-shirt up and used the knife to draw some type of mark or symbol on Vitale's back. He then turned Vitale over and stabbed deep into her midsection, leaving a gaping wound in her abdomen."

Even though Dyleski was originally sentenced to life without parole, in 2018 Dyleski's sentence was reduced to 25 years to life in prison after the state of California passed Senate Bill 394, which bill gives juveniles tried as adults and sentenced to life without parole a chance for eventual freedom. He will be eligible for parole in 2030.
