= Mitchell Silberberg & Knupp =

American entertainment law firm

Mitchell Silberberg & Knupp is a law firm founded in Los Angeles, California. It has additional offices in New York City, New York, and Washington, D.C.

Founded in 1908 by Shepard Mitchell and Mendel Silberberg, the firm became prominent in Hollywood when it began representing Columbia Pictures. It would go on to represent United Artists, MGM, RKO Pictures, Ingrid Bergman, Charlie Chaplin, Mary Pickford, Douglas Fairbanks, D.W. Griffith, Howard Hughes, Warren Beatty, Dustin Hoffman, Jack Nicholson, Paul Newman, Steve McQueen, Jean Harlow, the Alliance of Motion Picture and Television Producers, Rosalind Russell, Robert Taylor, Robert Wise, Goldie Hawn, Robert Wagner, Jack Kent Cooke, Norton Simon, Judy Garland, Edward G. Robinson, Roman Polanski, Dr. Gene Scott, Mick Jagger, Ed Asner, Michael Crichton, Jessica Lange, Dick Clark Productions, Tom Cruise, Anne Rice, the cable TV network Nickelodeon, Barbra Streisand, the Los Angeles Lakers, the Los Angeles Kings, the National Hockey League, and the estate of Marilyn Monroe. By the 1960s, Mitchell Silberberg "was the most prominent entertainment law firm in the world."

Beginning in the 1960s, the firm also began representing major record and music publishing companies as well as recording artists such as The Rolling Stones, The Beach Boys, The Mamas & The Papas, Neil Diamond, The Doors, Earth Wind & Fire, The Beatles, and Carole King. The firm had represented the Recording Industry Association of America since the 1960s. By the early 1970s, the music practice "was a far bigger source of revenue for the firm than movies, which were dying." The firm was an early advocate for filing record-company lawsuits against unauthorized duplicators." In 2000, the firm represented the recording industry in the seminal Napster copyright infringement case.

By the 1980s, the firm added several lawyers from defunct rival firm Kaplan Livingston Goodwin Berkowitz & Selvin. When smaller firms that prioritized percentage deals with actors and musicians began to dominate the entertainment legal landscape, Mitchell Silberberg decreased its focus on talent-side clients.

Beyond the entertainment industry, the firm was longtime counsel to Occidental Petroleum and Armand Hammer, and successfully represented the Fred Goldman family in the O. J. Simpson civil wrongful death case.
