= John J. Schumacher =

Dr. John J. Schumacher founded Southwestern University School of Law in 1911. Schumacher intended the university to be an independent, nonprofit, nonsectarian institution.

Schumacher intended Southwestern to provide legal education opportunities for qualified students that might not otherwise have an opportunity to pursue such a degree. For this reason, the university actively encouraged the enrollment of minorities and women.

== Scholarship ==
The Wildman/Schumacher Scholarship is Southwestern Law School’s most generous scholarship program, offering renewable tuition awards to entering first-year J.D. students. Scholarship decisions are based on academic performance, LSAT scores, letters of recommendation, and other factors determined by the scholarship committee.

Awards may cover up to full tuition and are renewable for the duration of the student’s program, provided renewal criteria are met. The scholarship is available to students in all of Southwestern’s J.D. programs: Full-Time Day, Part-Time Day, Evening, PLEAS, Online, and SCALE.
