= San Bernardino County Superior Court =

California superior court with jurisdiction over San Bernardino County

Superior Court of California, County of San Bernardino
- Interactive map of Superior Court of California, County of San Bernardino
- 34.10403°N 117.28839°W
- Established: 1850
- Jurisdiction: San Bernardino County, California
- Location: San Bernardino (county seat); Barstow; Big Bear; Colton; Fontana; Joshua Tree; Needles; Rancho Cucamonga (also Appeals); Victorville (also Juvenile)
- Coordinates: 34.10403°N 117.28839°W
- Appeals to: California Court of Appeal for the Fourth District, Division Two
- Website: sb-court.org

Presiding Judge
- Currently: Hon. Lisa M. Rogan
- Since: Jan 1, 2024
- Lead position ends: Dec 31, 2025

Assistant Presiding Judge
- Currently: Hon. Rod Cortez
- Since: Jan 1, 2024
- Lead position ends: Dec 31, 2025

Court Executive Officer
- Currently: Anabel Z. Romero
- Since: Nov 14, 2022

The Superior Court of California, County of San Bernardino, informally known as the San Bernardino County Superior Court, is the California superior court with jurisdiction over San Bernardino County.

== History ==
San Bernardino County was partitioned from Los Angeles County in 1853. San Bernardino was named the county seat, and the first county judge was Daniel M. Thomas, elected in January 1853. County affairs were conducted in the old Mormon Council-House, which was at the corner of Third and Grafton streets.

In 1858, the county built its first building, a jail, and rented a residence built originally by Q.S. Sparks at the corner of Fifth and E, to serve as the county offices until 1862, when court was moved to the former residence of Charles Glasier. This was a two-story wooden building and served until the first court house was completed in 1874 or 1878. The first courthouse was a two-story structure topped by a cupola, costing approximately US$40,000 to complete. Judge Thomas was succeeded by A.D. Boren in 1857; although M.H. Crafts won a considerable number of votes in the election of 1861, Judge Boren continued to serve as Crafts failed to follow up. Judge Boren served until 1871, succeeded by Judge Henry M. Willis, who would serve until the Superior Court system was implemented in 1879. The first Superior Court judge was H.C. Rolfe, who had previously served as the District Judge from 1872 to 1875.

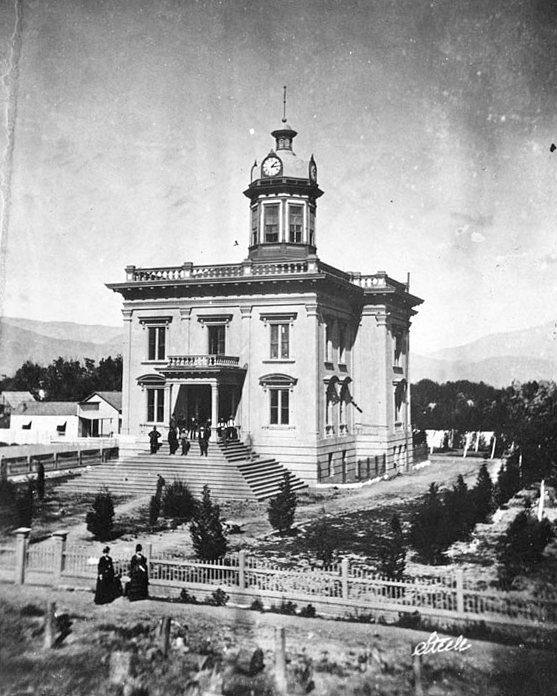
1874/78 courthouse

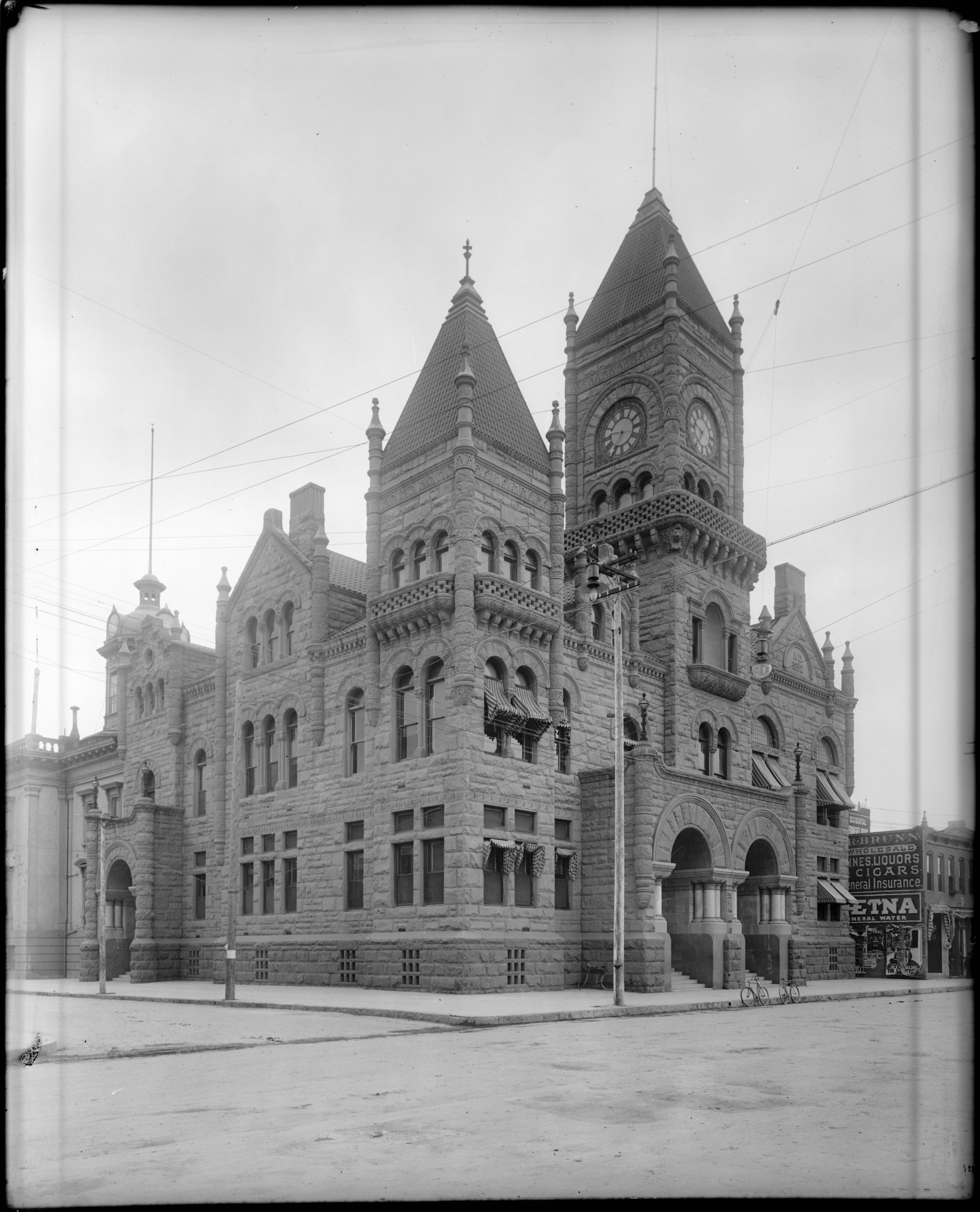
1898 courthouse, c. 1910

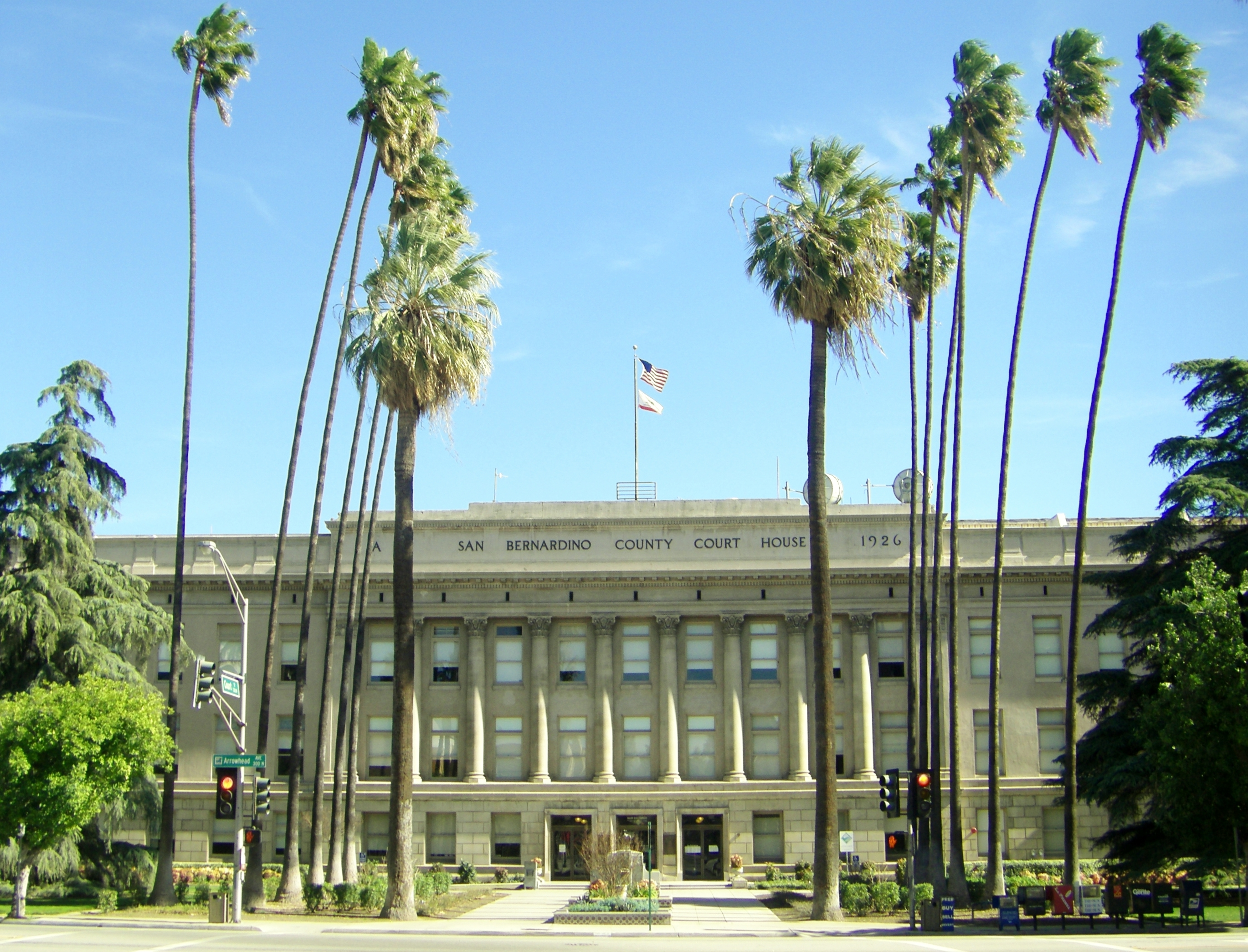
1928 San Bernardino County Courthouse (2009)

The 1874 courthouse served until 1898, when the second courthouse was completed. This second courthouse had a protracted development: an initial proposition to issue bonds for US$125,000 (equivalent to $4,480,000 in 2025) to build a new County Jail and Court House was defeated by voters in 1887, so the board of supervisors reissued the proposition for US$75,000 in bonds to build a new Hall of Records, which was also defeated. The Hall of Records was built in 1891 using proceeds from a tax that raised US$40,000. Two more propositions to issue bonds funding the construction of a new courthouse were also defeated, so the board of supervisors again levied a direct tax to complete the 1898 courthouse. The 1898 courthouse was designed by Charles H. Jones and was damaged in an earthquake in 1923, then demolished in 1928.

A new courthouse was completed in 1928 to a design by Howard E. Jones, the nephew of Charles H. Jones, who had designed the 1898 courthouse. The facade and cornerstone state the building was erected in 1926. It was dedicated on April 30, 1927. The 1928 courthouse was listed on the National Register of Historic Places in 1997.

The first Iranian American judge in the State of California was Shahla S. Sabet, and she appointed in San Bernardino County Superior Court in 1993.

A new San Bernardino Justice Center was completed in 2014 and occupied on March 12 of that year, designed by Skidmore, Owings, & Merrill and containing 383,745 ft^{2} (35,651.1 m^{2}) of floor space with 35 courtrooms.

== Venues ==
San Bernardino County Superior Court locations:
1 247 W 3rd St (San Bernardino: civil, criminal, probate)
655 W 2nd St (child support)
351 N Arrowhead Ave (family law)
2 900 E Gilbert St (San Bernardino: juvenile delinquency)
860 E Gilbert St (juvenile dependency)
3 235 E Mountain View St (Barstow)
4 477 Summit Blvd (Big Bear)
5 400 N Pepper Ave (Colton: mental health)
6 17780 Arrow Blvd (Fontana)
7 6527 White Feather Rd (Joshua Tree)
8 1111 Bailey Ave (Needles)
9 8303 Haven Ave (Rancho Cucamonga: also appeals)
10 216 Brookside Ave (Redlands, closed)
11 14455 Civic Dr (Victorville: also juvenile delinquency)

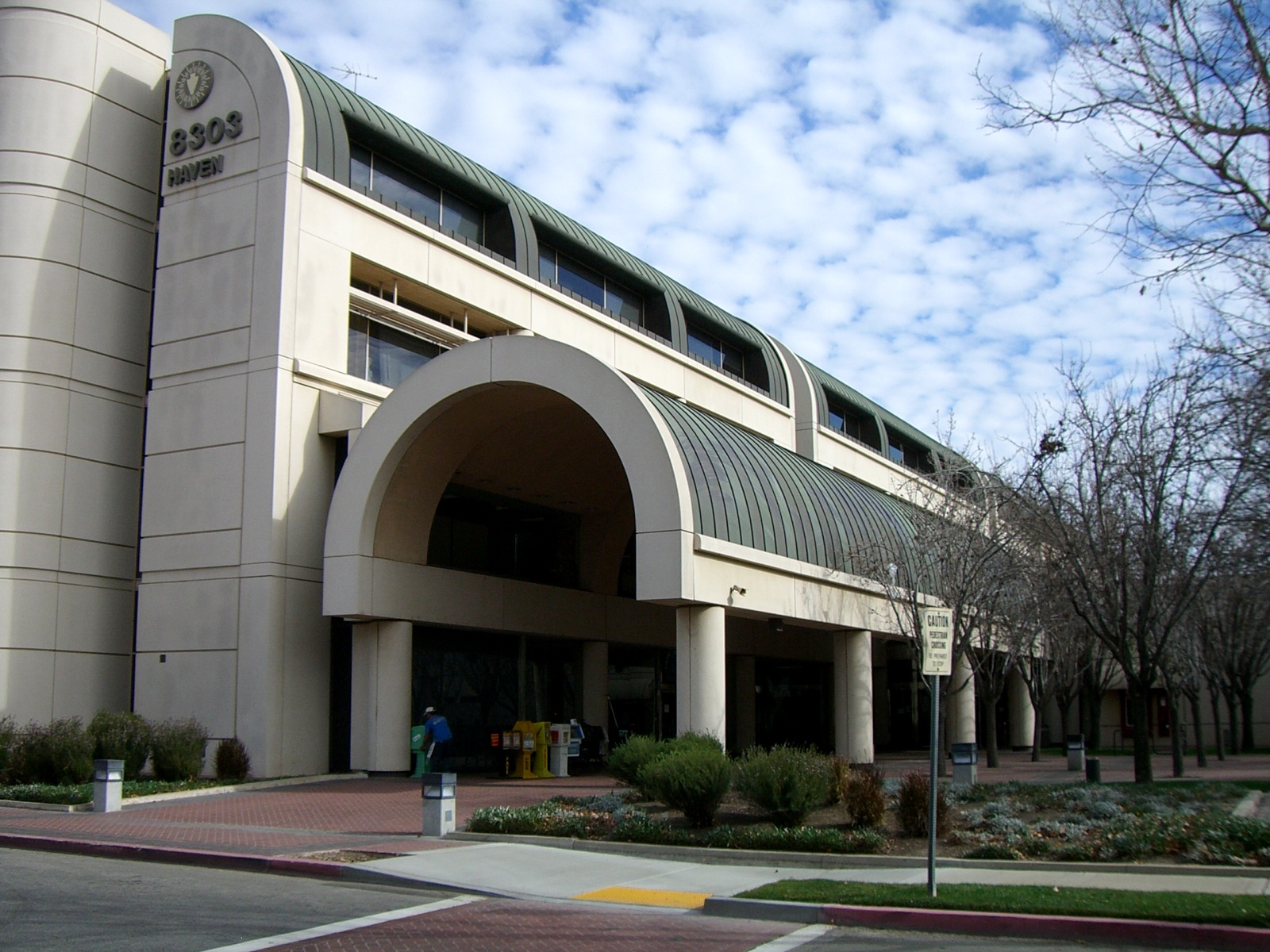
Rancho Cucamonga branch and appeals (2009)

The branch court in Redlands was consolidated and integrated into the new San Bernardino Justice Center after that building was completed in 2014.
