= Charlotte Anne Perretta =

First woman on the Massachusetts Appeals Court

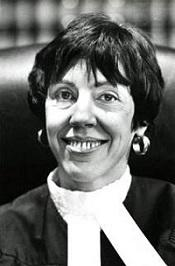
Justice Charlotte Anne Perretta

Charlotte Anne Perretta (1942 – April 10, 2015) was the first woman to sit on the Massachusetts Appeals Court.

== Early life and education ==
Perretta was born in 1942 and grew up in Hartford, Connecticut, to Lois (née Gubtil) and Armando Perretta, a homemaker and restaurateur. She had two brothers, Mike and James.

Perretta attended Mount St. Joseph Academy before receiving a bachelor's degree from the College of St. Elizabeth in 1964 and a law degree from Suffolk University Law School in 1967.

== Legal career ==
Early in her career, Perretta represented indigent clients with the Massachusetts Defenders Committee on post-conviction matters. She then joined the firm of Crane, Inker & Oteri where she argued cases before the Massachusetts Supreme Judicial Court and the Appeals Court, which had recently been created. She co-founded her own firm in the mid-1980s, Keating, Perretta & Pierce, before practicing with Ronald Wysocki. She worked in both state and federal courts and as an assistant in the Middlesex County District Attorney's office.

In 1978, then-Governor Michael S. Dukakis appointed her to the Appeals Court, the first woman to hold that post. She took the oath of office on December 21, 1978, becoming the second youngest appeals court justice ever.

Her portrait hangs in the main courtroom, facing the justice sitting on the bench. When she retired on October 2, 2009, she was the senior associate justice on the court and had authored over 1,700 opinions.

== Personal life ==
Perretta was the commencement speaker at Endicott College in 1982. She lived in Boston. In 1984, she received an honorary doctorate from New England School of Law, where she taught trial practice for many years as an adjunct faculty member.

She died April 10, 2015, at the age of 72 in Wallingford, Connecticut. Her funeral mass was said at Corpus Christi Church in Wethersfield, Connecticut. Perretta was buried in Mt St Benedict Cemetery in Bloomfield, Connecticut.

== See also ==
- List of first women lawyers and judges in Massachusetts
