= Blanche E. Braxton =

African-American lawyer

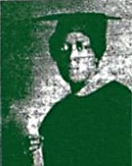
Braxton's Graduation Portrait

Blanche Estelle Braxton (née Woodson) was the first African American female lawyer in Massachusetts.

Braxton was graduated from Portia Law School in 1921. She lived in Roxbury, Massachusetts.

On March 16, 1923, Braxton became the first African American woman to be admitted to the bar in Massachusetts. Ten years later, on March 21, 1933, she became the first African American woman admitted to practice before the United States District Court in Massachusetts. Braxton was in private practice with an office at 412 Massachusetts Avenue. (Note: As of 2020, 412 Massachusetts Ave is the home of Youth Enrichment Services.)

== Education ==
It appears that Braxton, under her maiden name Blanche E. Woodson, received a diploma from the Girl's Evening Commercial High School in Boston, Massachusetts in March 1916.

Braxton attended the Portia School of Law, now known as New England Law | Boston. Portia Law was the first law school that offered legal education exclusively to women.

She graduated on June 1, 1921. 26 women received degrees with Braxton's class during ceremonies held at Tremont Temple.

== Legal career ==
=== Massachusetts Bar admission ===
On March 16, 1923, Braxton was admitted to the bar in Massachusetts.

=== United States District Court of Massachusetts Bar admission ===
Braxton was admitted to practice law in the Federal District Court on March 21, 1933. She was the first black woman to be admitted to practice in the United States District Court of Massachusetts.

The date she was admitted was the first date the federal court had their "opening prayer" delivered by a Roman Catholic priest, instead of a Protestant clergymen. The only other time the opening prayer had been delivered by a non-Protestant was three months prior, when it was delivered by a Jewish rabbi.

=== Legacy ===
The Massachusetts Black Women Attorneys Foundation provides a scholarship each year named in home of Braxton. It is "awarded to law students of color who have demonstrated outstanding academic excellence, a commitment to public service, and a dedication to the advancement of minoritized people through the legal process."

== Personal life ==
Prior to 1919, Braxton lived in a brick house in Roxbury, Massachusetts (30 Cedar Street).

In 1933, at the time of her admission to practice law in the federal district court, Braxton lived at 588 Columbus Avenue in Boston, Massachusetts.

== See also ==
- List of first women lawyers and judges in Massachusetts
