= Alpine Rockfest =

Annual sports and music event in Andalo, Italy

Rockfest logo as of 2013

The Alpine Rockfest is an annual event held at Paganella Ski Resort (Andalo) in the Italian Dolomites. The Alpine Rockfest is a televised sports-entertainment event featuring a rock music concert combined with an exhibition ski race consisting of Olympic & World Cup Ski Stars who are invited to compete for the largest cash prize in ski racing. The festival is organized by former head coach of the U.S. Ski Team men’s alpine team Phil McNichol & Italian entrepreneur Marco Dallapiccola, and first took place in 2009.

As Ted Ligety said: "There is definitely a nice party atmosphere here," Ligety said. "It's not as strict and stringent as the World Cup. It allows for a little more fan interaction and really lets the skiers shine a little bit better."“Every year this event gets bigger and bigger and I see so many people here today! I know this slope very well because I trained here for five years.”

As Bode Miller said: "The Alpine Rockfest is closer to the Olympics: you only have to win and go for the top of the podium. It 's definitely the ultimate expression of ski. The atmosphere is fantastic!”

According to Aksel Lund Svindal:"...Sono soddisfatto della mia gara. La formula dell'evento è fantastica, spettacolare per il pubblico e bella anche per noi atleti: ci si diverte, si sta insieme e c'è un confronto serrato, proprio come piace a noi». (Translation: I am satisfied with my race. The formula of the event is fantastic, spectacular for the public and good for us as athletes are having fun, you are together and there is a confrontation, just as we like it)

== Race format ==
The race format is a Sprint Giant Slalom complete with a jump; competitors race through elimination rounds in pursuit of the largest single cash prize in Ski Racing—€75,000. The ski racing is accompanied by rock music.

- The day begins with a morning Preliminary Round. Select athletes will compete for 5 spots in the next Round of 15.
- The remaining 3 rounds will be covered Live on TV and begins with the Round of 15. 10 prequalified athletes & 5 athletes from the morning Preliminary Round will battle for the 10 fastest times.
- Round of 10 continues the elimination as only the 5 fastest will advance to the Finals.
- The Final Round of 5 consists of the remaining fastest down to the last competitor and the last run of the day - Its "Winner Takes All" €75,000.

The bands playing at the event have been:

- 2009: Placebo
- 2011: Radiottanta, Ducktails
- 2012: The Bastard Sons of Dioniso, Le Origini della Specie
- 2013: South Punk, Stodlgang and the presence of Radio VivaFm with Dj Ivanix

=== Athletes ===
Olympics and World Cup ski athletes are the protagonist of the event, such as: Aksel Lund Svindal, Ted Ligety, Bode Miller, Cyprien Richard, Davide Simoncelli, Christof Innerhofer, Philipp Schörghofer, Dominik Paris...and many others.

== Past Alpine Rockfest Champions ==
- 2009: Cyprien Richard
- 2011: Ted Ligety
- 2012: Davide Simoncelli
- 2013: Ted Ligety
