= Emma Fall Schofield =

American judge

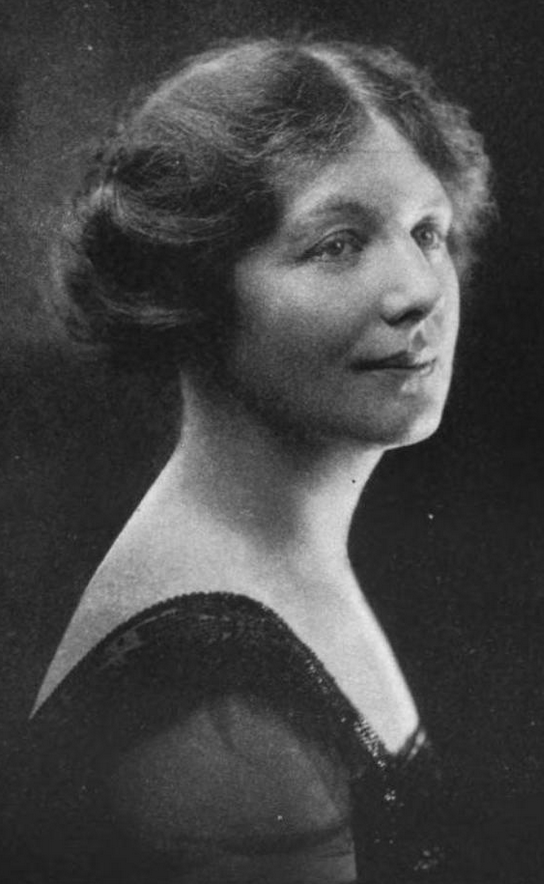
- Emma Fall Schofield, from a 1927 publication
- Born: Emma Latimer Fall; July 8, 1885; Malden, Massachusetts, U.S.
- Died: April 22, 1980 (aged 94)
- Occupations: Judge, lawyer, suffragist, clubwoman, writer
- Mother: Anna Christy Fall

Emma Fall Schofield (July 8, 1885 – April 22, 1980) was, along with Sadie Lipner Shulman, the first female judge in Massachusetts.

== Early life and education ==
Emma Latimer Fall was born on July 8, 1885, in Malden, Massachusetts, to George Howard Fall, a former Mayor of Malden, and Anna Christy Fall, the first female lawyer in Massachusetts. (Note: Her family's address was 265 Pleasant St.) Her parents met while students at Boston University School of Law and had their own law practice with offices in Malden and Boston. (Note: The Malden office was at 4 Summer Street.) Both parents were involved the women's suffrage movement.

As a child, Schofield, her four siblings, and her parents would speak Latin at breakfast. The law was a common topic of conversation in the family. Schofield would learn to speak Greek and several other languages.

Schofield was graduated from Malden High School and went on to Boston School for Social Workers. Following this, she spent a year studying at the Paris Law Faculty at the University of Paris. Returning to the United States, she was graduated from Boston University's College of Liberal Arts in 1906. Staying at Boston University, she earned A.B., LL.B cum laude, and LL.M degrees from Boston University School of Law in 1908. She was admitted to the bar the same year.

Even after being appointed as a judge and professor, Schofield continued to study. She was enrolled at the Calvin Coolidge College of Liberal Arts from 1953 to 1956. She studied across the United States, Europe, and Africa to write her doctoral dissertation on juvenile delinquency. She received a Doctor of Education degree from Coolidge College in 1956.

== South Africa ==
The Schofields moved to Port Elizabeth, South Africa three months after their wedding. As World War I was raging at the time, their ship had to take precautionary measures to avoid German u-boats. Ten months later, they returned to Boston via Singapore and San Francisco.

Soon thereafter, however, they returned to South Africa via the Pacific Ocean, stopping in Honolulu and Australia. Albert continued to South Africa on a cargo boat as there were no passengers ships. Scholfield and their baby instead went from Java to Singapore and then Durban, South Africa on a Japanese cargo ship.

The couple worked for the U.S. Tariff Commission investigating the wool industry. They returned to the United States in 1920.

== Feminist ==
Schofield was an activist for women's rights and an active member of the League of Women Voters. As a delegate to the 1932 Republican National Convention, she cast a vote for Calvin Coolidge. She called her lifetime a "golden age of opportunity for women."

In 1932, Schofield addressed the Zonta club in Binghamton and the Southern New York chapter of the American Association of University Women. She advocated for women to play a full role in society, pursuing careers and taking part in government. She also endorsed the Equal Rights Amendment in 1976.

== Career ==
=== Legal career ===
After graduation in 1908, Schofield began her legal career. She saw herself as a role model for other women who wished to enter a professional career. When her parents would not let her join their firm, she set up a private practice and authored articles for legal journals.

After returning from South Africa, Schofield resumed her work as a lawyer in 1922. In 1922, Governor Channing H. Cox appointed Scholfield as the first female member of the Industrial Accident Board. She remained in the position until 1927 when Attorney General Arthur K. Reading appointed her the first female assistant attorney general.

She was appointed by Massachusetts Governor Frank G. Allen as the first female judge in New England in 1930 simultaneously with Shulman. Scholfield served as associate justice of 1st District Court of Eastern Middlesex in Malden. She took the bench for the first time on December 20, 1930. In her role as a judge, she became the first woman to swear in a mayor of Malden, Fred I. Lamson, in 1956.

On December 12, 1957, Schofield retired at the age of 72. She continued in private practice after stepping down from the bench.

=== Professor of law ===
In October 1931, Schofield began teaching a course at Portia Law School and presided over a mock trial on February 26, 1932. She joined the faculty in 1932 and, in addition to mock court, taught courses in deeds, mortgages and easements, and examination of land titles. She also taught United States constitutional law at Portia. Later, Schofield was appointed as the dean of women at Northeastern University School of Law.

=== Other work ===
Schofield also worked as a probation officer in Springfield, Massachusetts. She was the first female probation officer in the western part of the state. As part of this role, she organized probation work for women and girls. In 1911 and 1912, she organized a girls club in Springfield.

As an author, Schofield penned three books describing her family and life in Malden: Arsenic in the Beans and Other Fantastic Adventures of an Absent-Minded Professor, Delightful yesterdays, and Anna Christy Fall – My Remarkable Mother.

== Personal life ==
=== Family ===
Emma Fall married Alebert Schofield on March 25, 1916. Their first son, Parker, was born in February 1917 while they were living in South Africa. Their second son, Albert Schofield, Jr., was born in 1920, the same year they returned to the United States. The family settled in Malden and, for the first two years of Albert Jr.'s life, Schofield dedicated herself to taking care of her children.

Scofield's mother, Anna Christy Fall, died in 1930 and her father and husband died within 24 hours of each other in 1937, when their children were 20 and 16 years old.

=== Civic life ===
As a civic leader, Schofield was a part of a number of women’s, civic, political, humanitarian, and world fellowship organizations and movements. She served as a president of Massachusetts Association of Woman Lawyers, the Professional Women’s Club of Boston, the Business and Professional Women’s Republican Club of Massachusetts, and the Women Graduate Club of Boston University.

She was the founding president of the Business and Professional Women’s Republican Club of Boston, Better Malden Associates, and the Zonta club of Boston. She organized the Malden Zonta Club and co-organized of the Malden Women’s Civic League. She was also a trustee of Boston University for more than 25 years. Schofield was also an active member of the Malden High School Alumni Association, the Malden YWCA, and the Lady’s Aide Association of Malden Hospital.

In Malden, she served six years on the School Committee and four years on the Common Council.

== Honors ==
Later in life, Schofield would receive honorary degrees from Curry College and Portia Law School.

For her work as an advocate for women, Kappa Kappa Gamma presented her with their "Woman of Achievement" award in 1953. The Malden chapter of B'nai B'rith awarded her their "Good Citizenship Award" in 1954. In the 1958-1959 edition of Who’s Who in America, Schofield was listed. She was also awarded the Distinguished Alumni Award from Boston University in 1970 in recognition of her "outstanding public service."

== Death ==
Schofield died on April 22, 1980, at the age of 94. She was buried at Forest Dale Cemetery in Malden.

== See also ==
- List of first women lawyers and judges in Massachusetts

== Works cited ==
- Drachman, Virginia G. (2001). Sisters in Law: Women Lawyers in Modern American History. Harvard University Press. ISBN 978-0-674-00694-2.
