= Harold Putnam (Massachusetts politician) =

American politician (1916–2007)

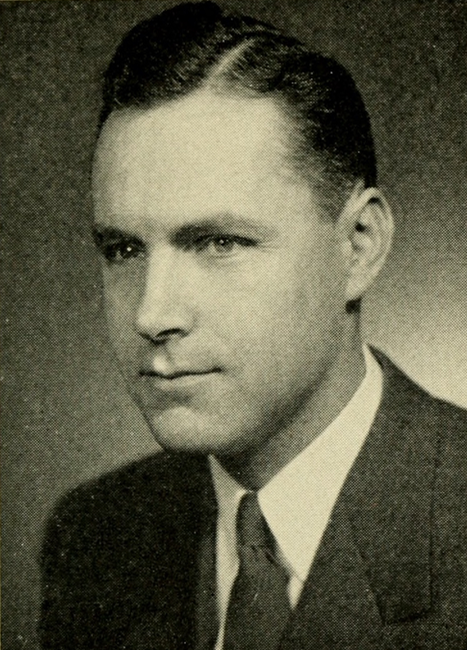
- Portrait of Putnam, 1953

New England Regional Director for the U.S. Department of Health, Education, and Welfare
- In office June 1, 1970 – February 28, 1973
- Succeeded by: Robert Fulton

Member of the Massachusetts House of Representatives from the 6th Norfolk district
- In office January 5, 1949 – January 2, 1957
- Preceded by: Leslie Bradley Cutler
- Succeeded by: Daniel H. Rider

Personal details
- Born: Harold Barnes Putnam Jr. February 15, 1916 Boston, Massachusetts, U.S.
- Died: January 9, 2007 (aged 90) Vero Beach, Florida, U.S.
- Party: Republican (before c. 1980s); Democratic (after c. 1980s)
- Spouses: Elizabeth Putnam (née Mason) (m. 1939; div. 1964); Glendora Putnam (née McIlwain) (m. 1964; div. 1977); Marlene Evans Putnam (m. 1980)
- Children: 3
- Education: Boston Latin School; Dartmouth College (BA); Boston University School of Law

Military service
- Branch/service: United States Navy
- Years of service: 1943–1945
- Rank: Lieutenant (junior grade)

Harold Barnes Putnam Jr. (February 15, 1916 – January 9, 2007) was an American politician, attorney, journalist, and artist. Born in Boston, he graduated from Dartmouth College, served in the U.S. Navy during World War II, and worked as a journalist at The Boston Globe. A member of the Republican Party, he represented the 6th Norfolk district in the Massachusetts House of Representatives from 1949 to 1957. From 1970 until his resignation in 1973, he served as a regional director in the U.S. Department of Health, Education, and Welfare. Putnam then became a professional artist.

== Early life and career ==
Harold Barnes Putnam Jr. was born on February 15, 1916, in Hyde Park, Boston, to Harold Barnes Putnam and Martha Hyde Putnam (née Sargent). Putnam received his primary education at Boston Latin School. He then attended Dartmouth College, where he received a Bachelor of Arts in 1937. At Dartmouth, he also gained an interest in art and began painting. He studied art at the Boston Museum of Fine Arts. He briefly attended Harvard Law School from 1950 to 1951; however, due to familial and legislative obligations, he did not graduate. He received a law degree from the Boston University School of Law in 1952.

He worked as a journalist for The Boston Globe from 1937 to 1948, with him serving as veterans columnist for some of this time. Putnam served in the United States Navy during World War II, from 1943 to 1945, as a gunnery officer, rising to the rank of lieutenant.

== Political career ==
Putnam entered politics in 1948, winning election to the Massachusetts House of Representative as a member of the Republican Party. According to Putnam, prior to his election he had identified most with the Democratic Party and its New Deal, but he had attempted to remain politically neutral due to his career in journalism. However, his home district was strongly Republican, and so he decided to become a Republican as that would allow him to be elected. He was reelected in 1950, 1952, and 1954. In the legislature, he was known as a strong supporter of desegregating Massachusetts' National Guard and public housing. He chaired the Municipal Finance committee and was a member of the Judiciary, Public Health, and Education committees.

In 1956, he did not seek reelection and instead sought election to represent Massachusetts's 13th congressional district in the United States House of Representatives. He was easily defeated by incumbent Richard B. Wigglesworth in the primary. After leaving office, Putnam opened law offices in Needham, Massachusetts, his home town, and Florida. He was a member of the bar in Florida and Massachusetts, as well as the Supreme Court bar. He was an assistant attorney general of Massachusetts in 1958. In 1958, Putnam again sought election to the House after Wigglesworth chose to not seek reelection. He was narrowly defeated in the primary by William W. Jenness, who was defeated in the general election by James A. Burke. He was the moderator of Needham for nine years.

From 1959 to 1963 Putnam served as counsel to the United States Senate Select Committee on Small Business. Putnam became Senator Leverett Saltonstall's legislative assistant in 1961. In 1963, he left Saltonstall's office to succeed former Speaker of the House Joseph Martin's chief aide as administrative assistant, managing his Washington office. He left Martin's office in January 1966 to become executive director of Battleship Cove, a museum including the U.S.S. Massachusetts. He was also a member of Massachusetts' delegation to the March on Washington.

Putnam was strongly associated with Massachusetts Attorney General Edward Brooke. In 1964, Putnam became Brooke's chief assistant, working mainly on major criminal cases. He also again became an assistant attorney general of Massachusetts in 1966. In early 1970, Putnam was set to become New England Regional Director for the U.S. Department of Health, Education, and Welfare (HEW), due to Brooke's political patronage. His appointment had been approved by HEW Secretary Robert Finch. In preparation for what he believed to be an imminent appointment, Putnam resigned as assistant attorney general in March 1970. However, his appointment was stalled, with the Springfield Daily News reporting that there was speculation this was to punish Brooke for opposing President Richard Nixon on the nomination of G. Harrold Carswell to the Supreme Court, school desegregation policies, and other matters. While waiting to be appointed, Putnam volunteered to serve as the general counsel to the Massachusetts Commission on Marine Boundaries and Resources, a role he held for three months. He was finally appointed by Finch in late May, taking office on June 1.

As expected of all members of the Nixon administration, Putnam submitted a pro forma resignation when Nixon was re-inaugurated. The resignation was accepted and Putnam left office in February 1973, with the administration saying his departure was due to his support of social programs and lack of administrative skills, amid a reorganization of HEW that would give his role more administrative responsibilities. His administrative skill was alternatively applauded and his departure characterized as being due to his insufficient loyalty to Nixon. Putnam characterized his departure as a termination. He also suspected it was in part because he had been cordial with U.S. Representative Bob Drinan, unaware that Drinan was on Nixon's enemy list.

After his departure, Putnam became legal counsel to the New England Conference of the National Association of the Advancement of Colored People (NAACP). In that role, he took part in an inquest after Lynn, Massachusetts, police faced no discipline after killing an unarmed Black man charged with no crime.

== Art and later life ==
In 1974, Putnam sold his first painting and his output increased greatly. Putnam won his first art competition in 1977, receiving first prize at an exhibition at the Ogunquit Museum of American Art. In 1978, Putnam transitioned away from his legal, administrative, and business career to became a full-time artist. Though, he did not fully abandon his previous career, with his business card reading "Harold Putnam, Artist / Lawyer". He specialized in oil paintings and his subjects were mostly New England landscapes and seascapes. He was the president of the Copley Society of Art for a time.

Putnam retired to Vero Beach, Florida, in 1980, and became active in Democratic Party politics around this time. He died on January 9, 2007, in Vero Beach.

== Family and personal life ==
Putnam was a member of the Putnam family, a prominent family which originated in Salem Village, Massachusetts, during the 1630s and later played a central role in the Salem witch trials. Upon his election to the Massachusetts House, he became the 49th member of it from his family and the 59th member of his family to serve in the Massachusetts General Court, across twelve generations of service.

Putnam married Elizabeth Mason in 1939 and the couple had three children. They divorced in 1964. In 1964, Putnam married Glendora McIlwain, an assistant attorney general of Massachusetts. They divorced in 1977. In 1980, Putnam married Marlene Evans Putnam, an artist.

== Works ==
- Dartmouth Book of Winter Sports (1939)
- The Putnams of Salem Village (1996)
- Yankee Journal: A Memoir of Public Service (1998)
- Salem Lady (2001)
- The Slave Trader's Wife (2003)
- Fearful Times (2005)

== See also ==
- Massachusetts legislature: 1949–1950, 1951–1952, 1953–1954, 1955–1956
