= List of first women lawyers and judges in Massachusetts =

This is a list of the first women lawyer(s) and judge(s) in Massachusetts. It includes the year in which the women were admitted to practice law (in parentheses). Also included are women who achieved other distinctions such becoming the first in their state to graduate from law school or become a political figure.

== Firsts in state history ==
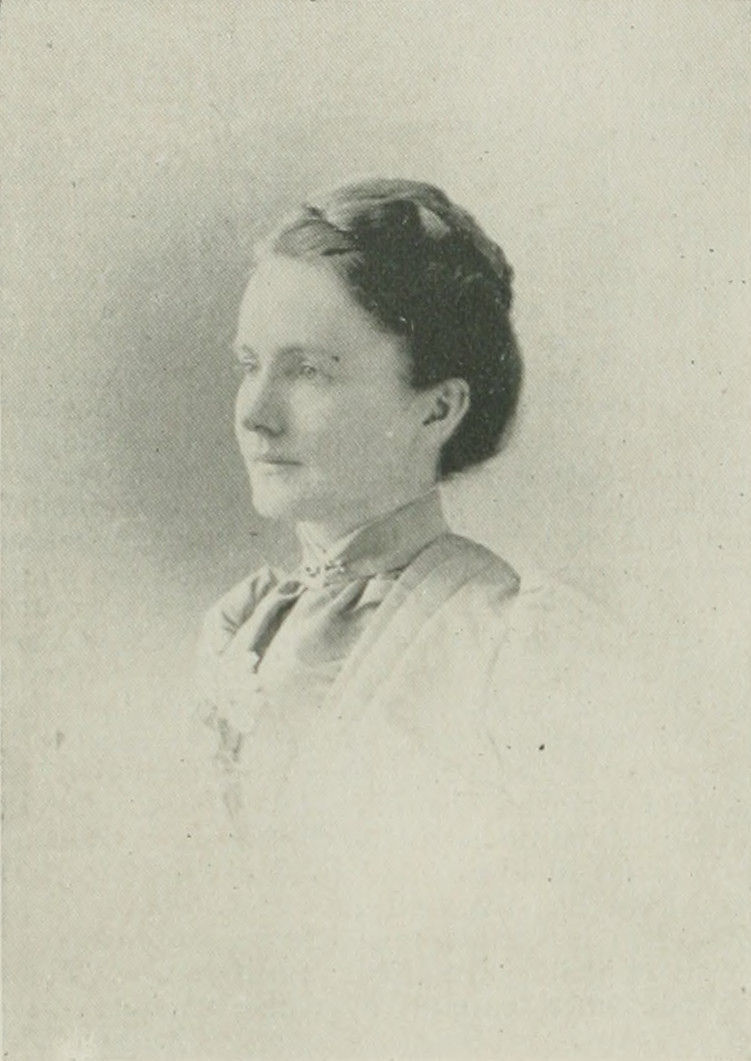
Anna Christy Fall: First female lawyer to argue a case before a jury in Massachusetts

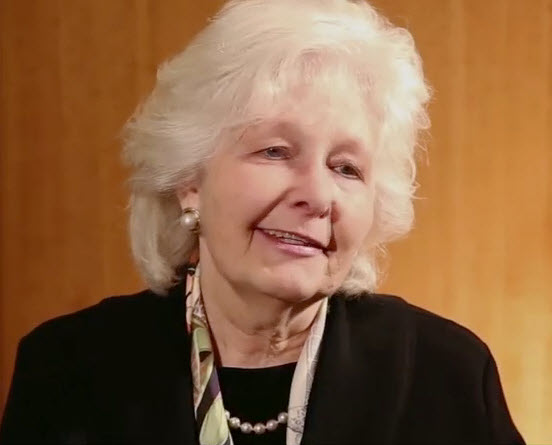
Margaret H. Marshall: First female Chief Justice of the Massachusetts Supreme Judicial Court (1999)

=== Law School ===
- First African American female law graduate: Blanche E. Braxton in 1923

=== Lawyers ===
- First female: Lelia J. Robinson (1882)
- First female (to argue case in jury trial): Anna Christy Fall (1891)
- First female (to appear before the full bench of the Massachusetts Supreme Judicial Court): Margaret M. McChesney (1921) in 1926
- First African American female: Blanche E. Braxton (1923): lawyer in Massachusetts. She is also the first African American female lawyer to practice in the United States District Court in Massachusetts in 1933.
- First Armenian American female: Norma M. Karaian
- First African American female (to follow her father to the bar and practice law with him): Jacqueline R. Guild Lloyd (1933)
- First African American female (practice before the United States District Court of Massachusetts): Blanche E. Braxton (1923) in 1933
- First openly LGBT (female): Katherine Triantafillou (1975)

=== State judges ===
- First females: Emma Fall Schofield (1908) and Sadie Lipner Shulman (1911) in 1930
- First female (full judgeship and a presiding judge): Ethel E. Mackiernan (c. 1918) during the 1930s
- First female (Associate Justice of the Boston Municipal Court): Jennie Loitman Barron (c. 1914) in 1937
- First female (Associate Judge of the Massachusetts Superior Court): Jennie Loitman Barron (c. 1914) around 1959
- First female (probate court): Sheila E. McGovern in 1974
- First African American female: Margaret Burnham in 1977
- First female (Massachusetts Appeals Court): Charlotte Anne Perretta in 1978
- First female to serve on the Massachusetts Supreme Judicial Court: Ruth Abrams in 1978
- First African American female (Massachusetts District Court): Marie O. Jackson-Thompson in 1980
- First female [First Justice of the Massachusetts Probate and Family Court (Middlesex)]: Sheila E. McGovern in 1980
- First Latino American females: Angela M. Ordoñez and María López (1978) in 1987-1988. Ordoñez was also the first openly lesbian judge in Massachusetts.
- First openly LGBT females: Angela M. Ordoñez and Linda Giles in 1987-1991
- First person of color (Massachusetts Probate and Family Court): Judith Nelson Dilday (1974) in 1993
- First female (Massachusetts Supreme Judicial Court): Margaret H. Marshall in 1999
- First Indian American female: Sabita Singh (1990)
- First openly LGBT female (Massachusetts Supreme Judicial Court): Barbara Lenk (1979) in 2011
- First Asian American (female) (Massachusetts Supreme Judicial Court): Fernande R. V. Duffly in 2011
- First African American female (Massachusetts Appeals Court): Geraldine Hines in 2013
- First Hispanic American (female) to serve as a chief justice: Angela M. Ordoñez in 2013
- First Asian American (female) (Massachusetts Juvenile Court): Gloria Tan in 2013
- First Korean American female: Eleanor Coe Sinnott in 2006
- First Latino American female (Massachusetts Supreme Judicial Court): Dalila Argaez Wendlandt in 2020
- First Armenian American (female) (Massachusetts Supreme Judicial Court): Gabrielle Wolohojian in 2024

=== Federal judges ===
- First female (United States Bankruptcy Court in the District of Massachusetts and its First Circuit): Carol. J. Kenner in 1986
- First Asian Pacific American female (U.S. District Court for the District of Massachusetts): Indira Talwani (1988) in 2014
- First African American female (U.S. District Court for the District of Massachusetts): Denise J. Casper (1994)
- First Hispanic American (female) (U.S. District Court for the District of Massachusetts): Margaret Guzman in 2023

=== Attorney General of Massachusetts ===
- First female: Martha Coakley (c. 1979) from 2007-2015
- First openly LGBT female: Maura Healey (1998) in 2015
- First African American female: Andrea Campbell in 2022

=== Assistant Attorney General of Massachusetts ===
- First female: Emma Fall Schofield (1908)
- First African American female: Glendora Putnam (1948) in 1964

=== U.S. Attorney for Massachusetts ===
- First (Hispanic American) female: Carmen Ortiz (1981) in 2009
- First African American female: Rachael Rollins in 2022

=== District Attorney ===
- First female: Elizabeth "Betsy" Scheibel in 1993
- First African American female: Rachael Rollins in 2018

=== Political Office ===
- First openly lesbian female (Governor-elect of Massachusetts): Maura Healey (1998) in 2022

=== Massachusetts Bar Association ===
- First female (president): Alice E. Richmond from 1986-1987

== Firsts in local history ==
- Elizabeth "Betsy" Scheibel: First female to serve as the District Attorney for the Northwestern District in Massachusetts (1993) [Franklin and Hampshire Counties, Massachusetts]
- Harriet L. Kilbourne (1897): First female admitted to the Berkshire County Bar Association [Berkshire County, Massachusetts]
- Andrea Harrington: First female District Attorney for Berkshire County, Massachusetts (2018)
- Louise Fairchild: First female Justice of the Peace in Lynn, Essex County, Massachusetts (1927)
- Mary E. Hyde: First female lawyer in Fall River, Massachusetts [Bristol County, Massachusetts]
- Elvah H. Young (1899): First female lawyer in Hampden County, Massachusetts
- Martha Coakley (c. 1979): First female District Attorney for Middlesex County, Massachusetts
- Ruth Abrams: First female to serve as the Assistant District Attorney for Middlesex County, Massachusetts
- Margaret Montoya: First Latino American female to graduate from Harvard Law School (1972) [Cambridge, Middlesex County, Massachusetts]
- Linda Sheryl Greene: First African American female to teach at Harvard Law School (1981)
- Haben Girma (2013): First deafblind graduate (who is also female and of Eritrean-Ethiopian descent) of Harvard Law School [Cambridge, Middlesex County, Massachusetts]
- Priscila Coronado: First Latino American female to serve as the President of the Harvard Law Review (2021)
- Arlene Hassett: First female judge in Lowell, Massachusetts (1972) [Middlesex County, Massachusetts]
- Anna E. Hirsch: First female (a lawyer) elected as the Registrar of Probate in Norfolk County, Massachusetts (1954)
- Katherine Triantafillou (1975): First openly LGBT (female) lawyer in Massachusetts
- Gene D. Dahmen: First female President of the Boston Bar Association (1987-1988) [Suffolk County, Massachusetts]
- Camille A. Nelson: First (African American) female to serve as the Dean of Suffolk University Law School (2010)
- Rachael Rollins: First female (and African American female) to become a District Attorney for Suffolk County, Massachusetts (2018)
- Michelle Wu: First (Asian American) female (a lawyer) to serve as the mayor of Boston, Massachusetts (2021)
- Stephanie Grant (1908): First female admitted to the Worcester Bar Association
- Addie Gillette (1897): First female lawyer to actually practice in Worcester County, Massachusetts

== See also ==
- List of first women lawyers and judges in the United States
- Timeline of women lawyers in the United States
- Women in law

== Other topics of interest ==
- List of first minority male lawyers and judges in the United States
- List of first minority male lawyers and judges in Massachusetts
