= Ethel E. Mackiernan =

American judge

Ethel E. Mackiernan was the first woman appointed to a presiding judgeship in the Commonwealth of Massachusetts.

Mackiernan attended Portia Law School.

Mackiernan began her legal career in Boston in 1918 and became attorney for the Nantucket Institution for Savings. She was the first woman to be appointed to a full-time judgeship. In 1935, she was appointed by Governor Joseph B. Ely as a judge in the Nantucket District Court. In this position she became the first presiding judge of any court in Massachusetts.

Mackiernan was an incorporator of the Norfolk Varnish Co. and assistant treasurer of the Jamaica Plain Cooperative Bank. She lived at 240 Babcock Street in Brookline, Massachusetts. She was a member of the Appalachian Mountain Club.

== See also ==
- List of first women lawyers and judges in Massachusetts
