= Margaret M. McChesney =

American lawyer

Margaret M. McChesney was the first female lawyer to appear before the full bench of the Massachusetts Supreme Judicial Court.

== Personal life and education ==
McChesney was from Boston and Quincy Massachusetts and graduated from the Portia School of Law in 1921.

== Legal career ==
McChesney became the first female lawyer to appear before the full bench of the Massachusetts Supreme Judicial Court in 1926 when she represented a client charged with drunk driving. In 1931, she was admitted to the bar in federal courts, and was "one of the most successful lawyers in Boston."

McChesney also taught law at Portia Law School, as well as a member of Phi Delta Delta.

== See also ==
- List of first women lawyers and judges in Massachusetts
