= Tom Wallisch =

American freeskier (born 1987)

Personal information
- Born: July 22, 1987 (age 38) Pittsburgh, Pennsylvania, U.S.
- Height: 5 ft 8 in (173 cm)
- Weight: 150 lb (68 kg)
Medal record
Men's freestyle skiing
Representing the United States
FIS Freestyle World Ski Championships
Gold medal – first place	2013 Voss	SlopeStyle
Winter Dew Tour
Gold medal – first place	2009 Northstart-at-Tahoe	SlopeStyle
Gold medal – first place	2011 Breckenridge	SlopeStyle
Gold medal – first place	2011 Killington	SlopeStyle
Gold medal – first place	2011 Overall	SlopeStyle
Winter X Games
Gold medal – first place	2012 Aspen	SlopeStyle

Tom Wallisch (/ˈwɔːlɪʃ/ WAW-lish; born July 22, 1987, in Pittsburgh, Pennsylvania) is a professional freeskier.

== Early life and education ==
Wallisch began skiing in 1990 and competing in the sport in 2009. After graduating from high school, Wallisch moved to Salt Lake City for post-secondary education at the University of Utah where he is pursuing a degree in the school of business.

== Professional skiing career ==
Wallisch was discovered when he entered and subsequently won the 2007 Level 1 SuperUnknown video contest. The video was produced by 4Bi9 Media. He pioneered the trend of becoming famous in free skiing by posting videos of his skills online. Typically, fame is achieved in the sport by winning competitions. Reversing this trend, however, Wallisch achieved success in competitions after becoming famous through video parts.

At Winter X Games XVI, Wallisch won gold in the Slopestyle event.

Wallisch is well regarded for his smooth yet complex spins and composed style. Known for being an early adopter of extremely baggy (XXL+) ski clothing as a fashion statement, Wallisch is also credited with popularizing the concept of "Afterbang." This is a highly stylized and rigid leaning pose assumed immediately after landing a trick, which is sometimes attributed to the dance move showcased in rapper Fat Joe's 2004 mega-hit Lean Back. Both of these trends were borne out of greater Hip Hop culture.

Wallisch is only the third skier in history to win Powder's coveted Reader Poll and the second to take it back-to-back (2011, 2012). He joins only Shane McConkey and Seth Morrison in taking the honor. He has also won Freeskier Magazine's Skier of the Year award (2010, 2012), receiving 30,000 fan votes on Freeskier.com.

The 2012 season is considered to be Wallisch's breakout competition season. He won gold at the X Games, won the Killington Dew Tour, finished second at European X Games in France, and finished second at the Dew Tour stop at Snowbasin. Wallisch also won the title for the overall Dew Tour Dew Cup and was named the 2012 Men's Slopestyle World Champion.

After years of filming with 4Bi9 Media and Level 1 Productions, Wallisch created a solo film project with cinematographer Kyle Decker for the 2012/2013 season, titled "The Wallisch Project."

In the 2013–2014 season, Wallisch tore his ACL and was unable to qualify for the Sochi Olympics. The short film "Skier's Discretion" (4Bi9 Media) explained the injury and Wallisch's attempts to qualify for the games. Also during the 2013-2014 Olympic season, Wallisch was featured in a Vice Documentary on the sport of Freeskiing.

For the 2014-2015 ski season, Wallisch switched from his previous ski and goggle sponsor, Scott Sports, to Shred Optics and LINE Skis. Wallisch also shifted his primary focus from competitions to park and urban filming. Wallisch films primarily with the ski content production house "Good Company."

In 2016, Wallisch set a world record with a 424-foot rail grind, surpassing Simen Gjelsvik's previous record of 405 feet.

Tom has a notable release of his Pro Model, the Tom Wallisch Pro from Line Skis which has received rave reviews.

== Notable competition results ==
- 2nd, Winter X Games, Tignes, 2012 (slopestyle)
- 3rd, Winter X Games, Aspen 2012 (slopestyle)
- 1st, Dew Tour stop #1, Killington, 2012 (slopestyle)
- 1st, Dew Tour stop #1, Breckenridge, 2011 (slopestyle)
- 1st, Winter X Games, Tignes, 2010 (slopestyle)
- 3rd, Dumont Cup, 2010 (slopestyle)
- 1st, Dew Tour stop #2, 2010 (slopestyle)
- 2nd, AFP Year End, 2010 (slopestyle)
- 2nd, Dew Tour stop #1, Breckenridge, 2009 (slopestyle)
- 1st, Winter Games NZ, 2009 (slopestyle)
- 2nd, New Zealand Open, 2009 (slopestyle)
- 1st, Dumont Cup, 2009 (slopestyle)
- 2nd, European Open, 2009 (slopestyle)
- 1st, Dew Tour stop #3, Northstar, 2009 (slopestyle)
- 1st, AFP Year End, 2009 (slopestyle)
- 1st, Ryan Lichtenberg Memorial 2006 (Rail Jam)
- Rated as ESPN´S Athlete of the year 2012
- 3x Powder Magazine's Reader Poll Athlete of the Year (2011, 2012, & 2013)

== See also ==
- Freeskiing
- Newschool Skiing
