= Andalo =

Municipality in Trentino-Alto Adige/Südtirol, Italy

- Comune
- Comune di Andalo
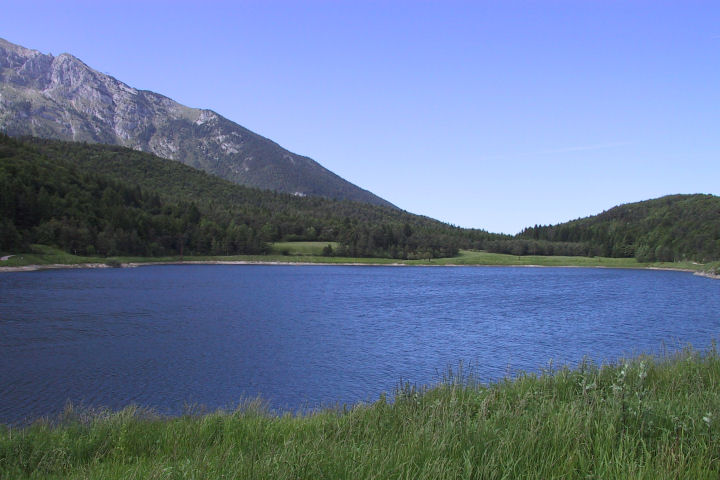
- Andalo Lake

- Coat of arms

- Location of Andalo in Italy Andalo (Trentino-Alto Adige/Südtirol)
- Coordinates: 46°10′0″N 11°0′16″E
- Country: Italy
- Region: Trentino-Alto Adige/Südtirol
- Province: Trentino (TN)

Government
  - Mayor: Eleonora Bottamedi

Area
  - Total: 11.38 km^{2} (4.39 sq mi)
- Elevation: 1,040 m (3,410 ft)

Population (2026)
  - Total: 1,237
  - Density: 108.7/km^{2} (281.5/sq mi)
- Demonym: Andalesi
- Time zone: UTC+1 (CET)
  - Summer (DST): UTC+2 (CEST)
- Postal code: 38010
- Dialing code: 0461
- Patron saint: Saint Vitus
- Saint day: 15 June
- Website: Official website

Andalo (Àndel in local dialect) is a comune (municipality) in Trentino in north Italy, with some 1,200 inhabitants in 2021. It is the seat of the Comunità di Valle dell'Altopiano della Paganella.

== Geography ==
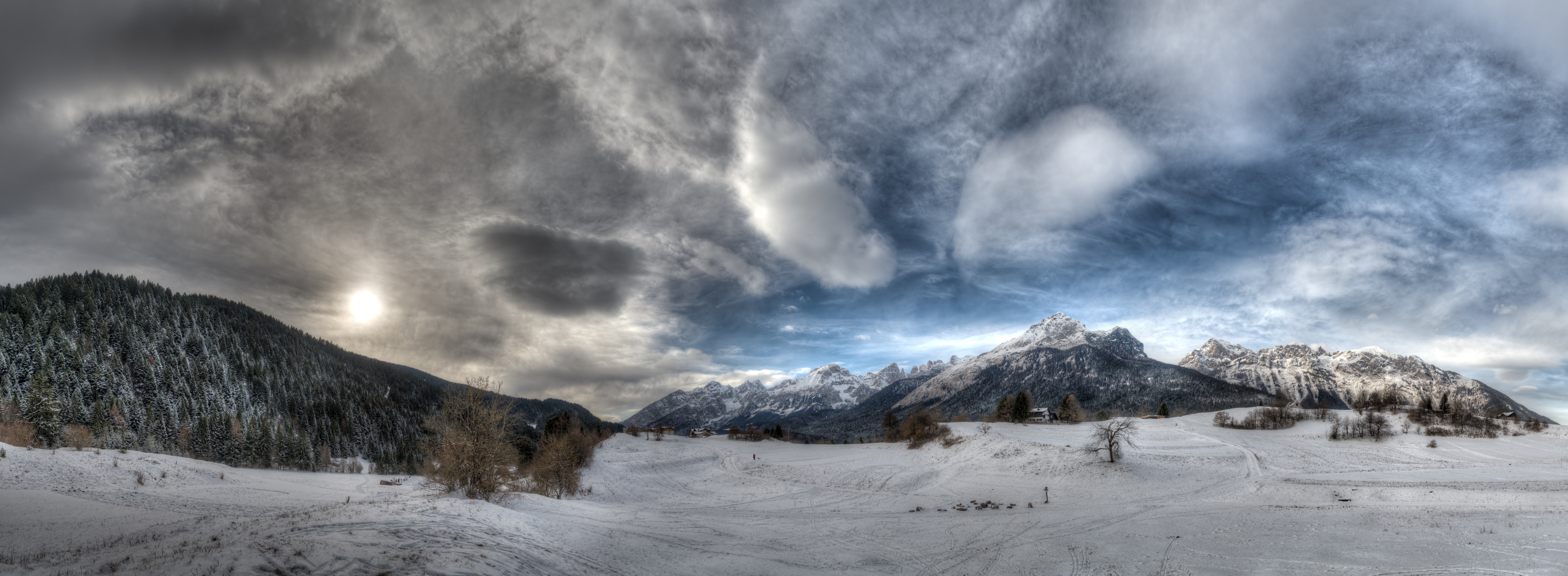
winter Panorama of the mountains of Andalo

The town lies on the Paganella plateau, between the mountains Piz Galin, elevation 2,442 metres (8,012 ft), and Paganella, 2,125 metres (6,972 ft), and its territory is part of the Adamello-Brenta natural park.

== History ==
The area was first settled during the Middle Ages, and used to be divided into 13 hamlets called “masi” (Bortolon, Cadin, Casanova, Clamer, Dos, Fovo, Ghezzi, Melchiori, Monech, Pegorar, Perli, Pont and Toscana), which eventually merged into a single town. This fragmentation can still be noticed, especially in the most isolated masi (for instance, maso Pegorar).

During the second part of the 20th century the village became one of the most famous touristic resorts in Trentino, mainly due to its skiing facilities.

== Economy ==
The local economy, once reliant exclusively on agriculture, is now almost completely centered on tourism (both during the summer and the winter, as opposed to some of the surrounding towns), mainly due to the town's position within the Dolomites. As a result of tourism, Andalo is among the wealthiest towns in the province and in the country. The Paganella Ski Resort is located in the municipality, where Alpine Rockfest is held annually.
