= Shred Optics =

Manufacturing company

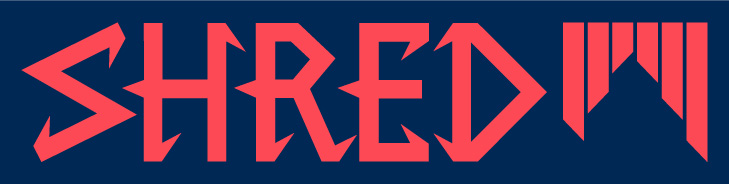
- Company type: Private
- Industry: Retail
- Founded: 2006; 20 years ago
- Headquarters: Park City, Utah, U.S. and Venice, Italy
- Key people: Ted Ligety - Cofounder and Chairman; Carlo Salmini - Cofounder and CEO
- Products: Sunglasses; Helmets; Goggles
- Website: shredoptics.com

Shred Optics is a manufacturer of sunglasses, helmets, and goggles designed for skiing, mountain biking, snowboarding, and other forms of outdoor recreation. The company is based in Park City, Utah, and Venice, Italy.

== History ==
Shortly after winning his first Olympic gold medal in alpine skiing, Ted Ligety partnered with Carlo Salmini, a materials engineer graduate of the MIT Sloan School of Management and an avid skier, to create Shred in the fall of 2006. Just a few months earlier, the duo also created Slytech, which manufactures protective equipment for skiing, snowboarding and mountain biking.

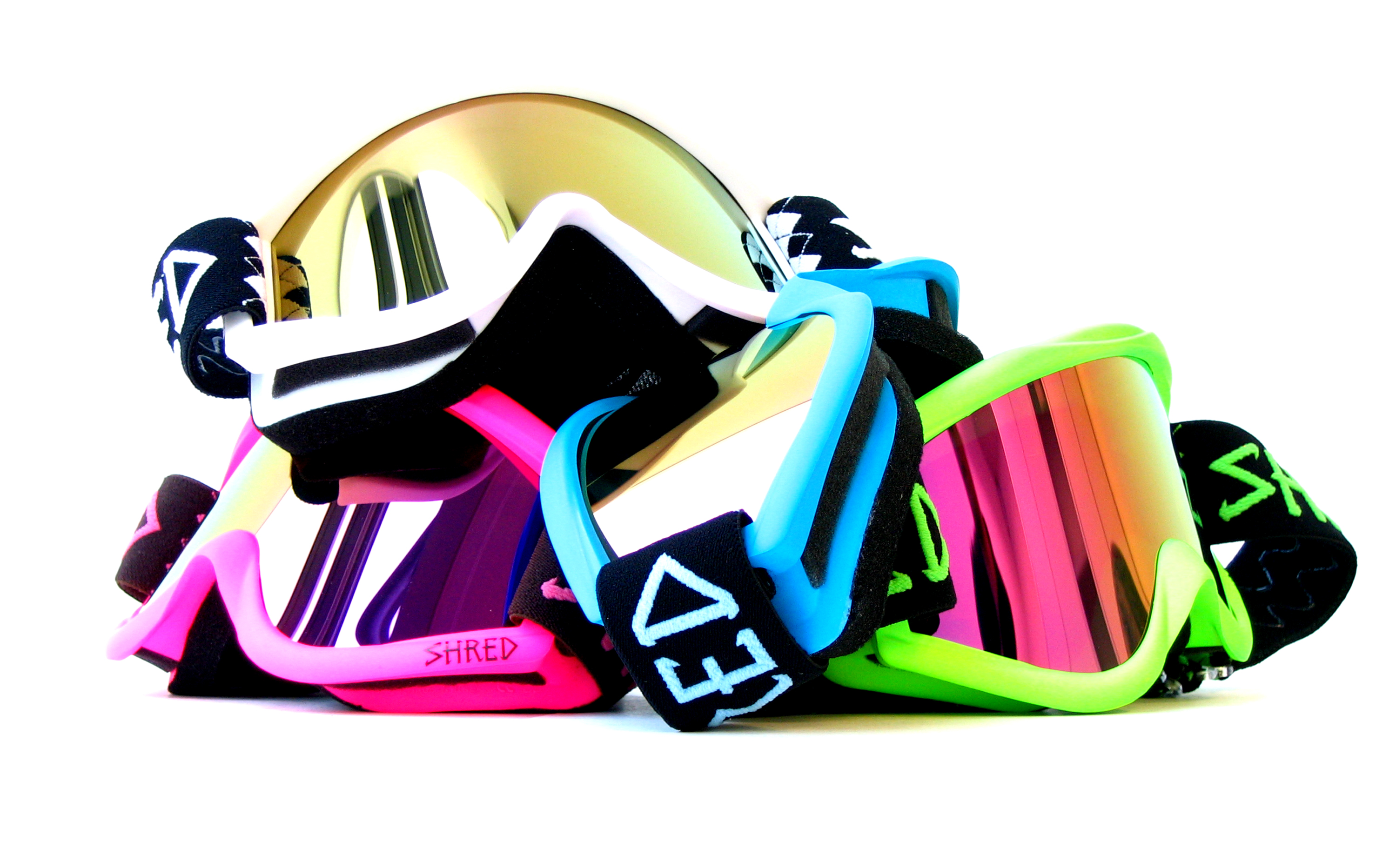
Shred's inaugural collection of goggles

Shred made its debut with a collection of four goggles, followed by helmets and sunglasses. Since its inception, the brand has emphasized freeride culture, catering to the needs of skiers, snowboarders, and mountain bikers. It has sponsored numerous athletes, including snowboarders Romain De Marchi, Wolle Nyvelt, Tadashi Fuse, Kevin Backstrom, Victor de Le Rue, Brandon Cocard, Shin Biyajima, and Antti Autti, as well as mountain bikers Kelly McGarry, KC Deane, Reece Wallace, and Ryan Nyquist. The company has also sponsored skiers Lara Gut, Carlo Janka, Resi Stiegler, Alexis Pinturault, and Tom Wallisch.

== Technical Innovation ==
=== Rotational Energy System ===
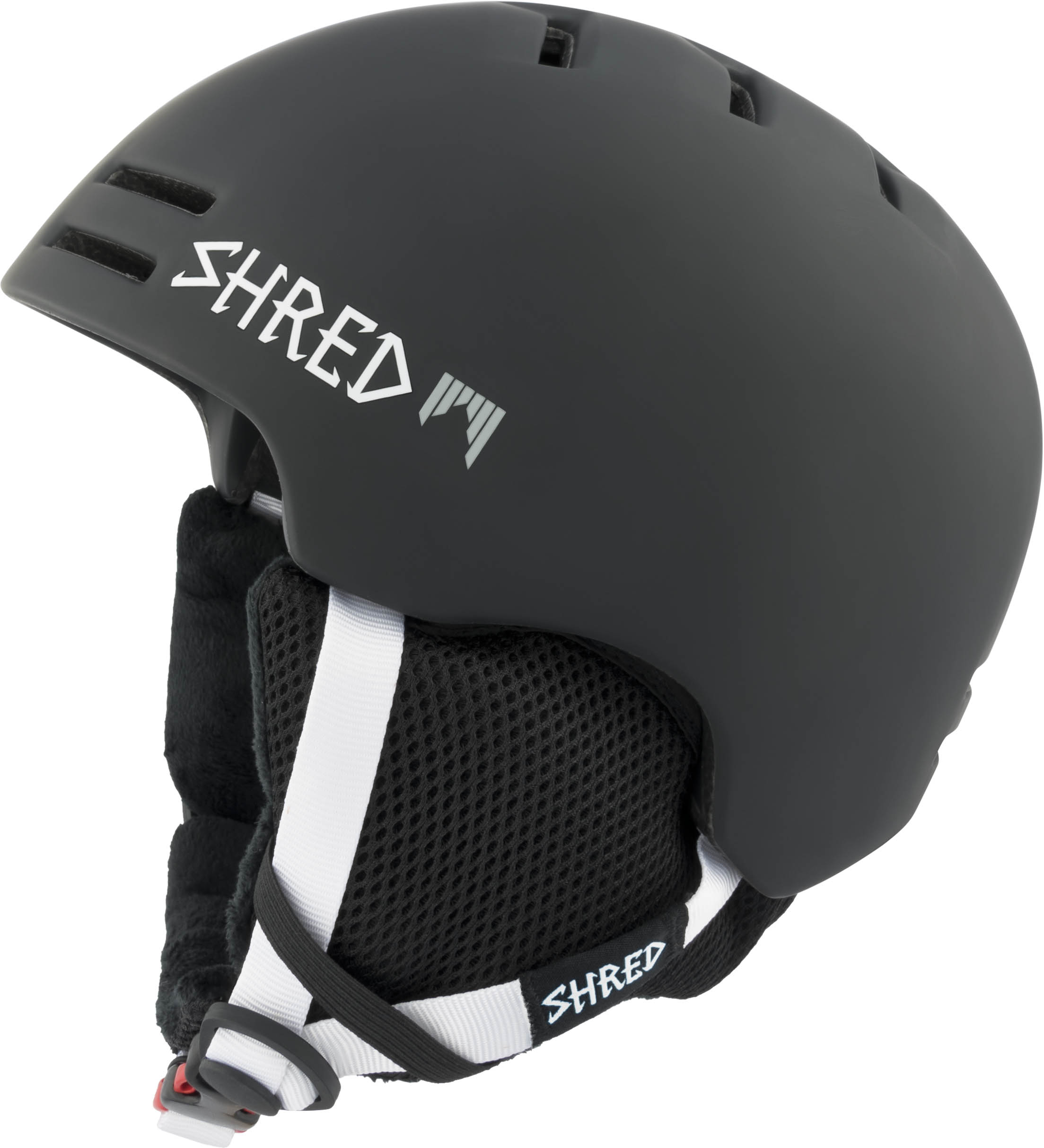
Shred incorporates its Rotational Energy System into both its snow and bike helmets

In 2015, Shred introduced one of the first helmet systems designed to address not only the linear forces of impact energy but also rotational forces. Historically, helmets only mitigated the effects of linear forces, leaving skiers, bikers, and snowboarders more susceptible to injury. Shred’s patent pending Rotational Energy System (RES) mimics the natural cushioning behaviour of the fluid between the skull and the brain. RES redirects rotational forces by allowing a small amount of relative movement between the helmet and the head during impacts from any direction. This reduces rotational energy transferred to the head. Since its inception, RES has been noted for its ability to offer protection from rotational energy in all directions. Unlike other systems, it has no preferential directions that compromise the protection the helmet affords. It also has minimal impact on the helmet’s weight and dimensions.

=== Contrast Boosting Lens ===
In 2016, Shred introduced its Contrast Boosting Lens (CBL) technology to enhance clarity and contrast. Featured in the brand’s goggles and sunglasses, these lenses use a variety of tinted dyes that are tailored to the prevailing light conditions and activities for which the goggles or sunglasses are designed.

=== ShredWide ===
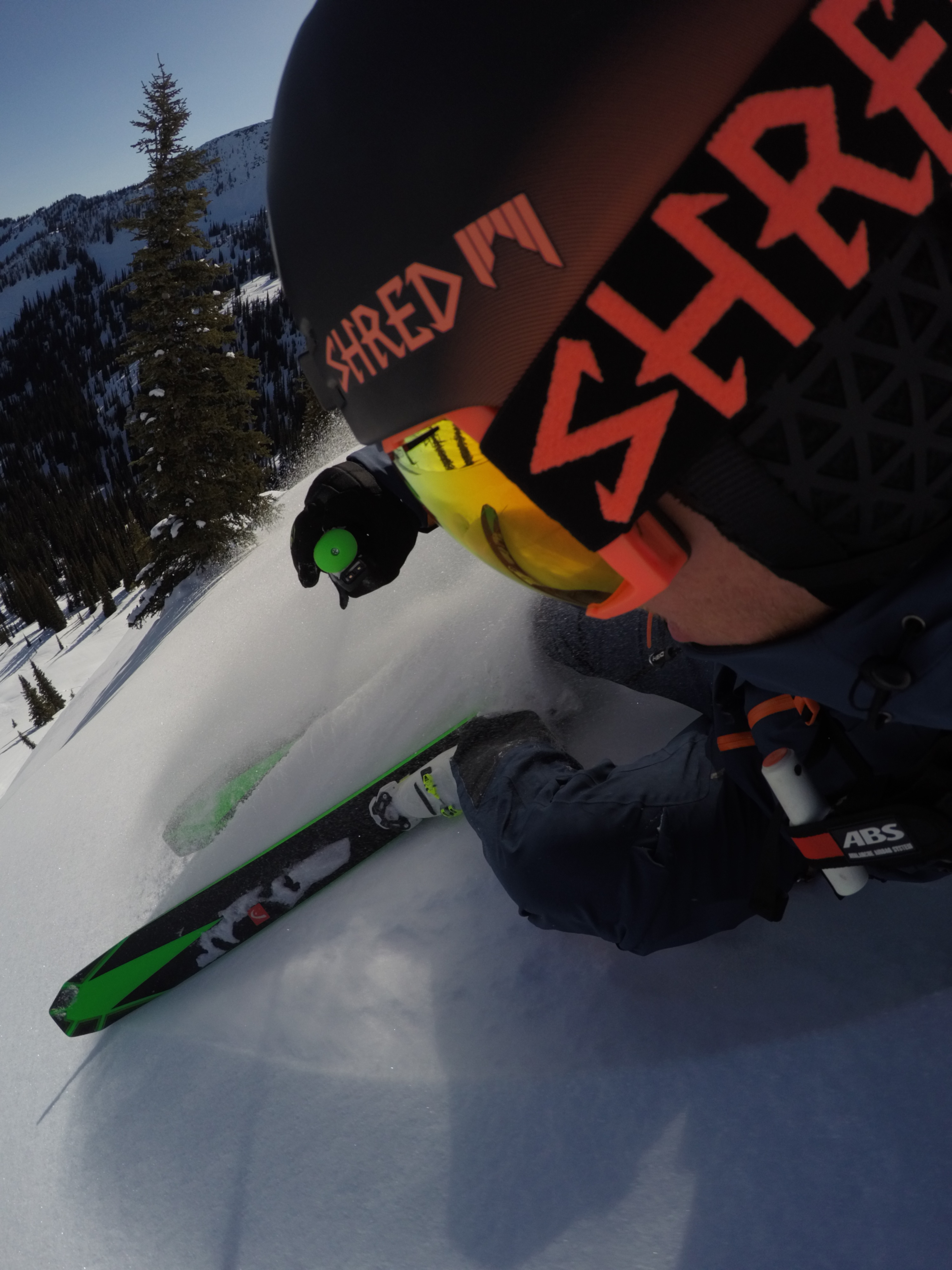
Shred Cofounder Ted Ligety

ShredWide is a goggle lens and frame design principle that reduces the field of vision restrictions in products designed for skiers, bikers and snowboarders. By offering a larger field of vision, this design aims to enhance safety and performance. Shred emphasized this larger field of vision beginning with its initial goggle collection.

=== NoDistortion ===
Shred’s patented NoDistortion technology uses a semi-permeable valve to equalize the pressure between a goggle’s dual lens chamber and the current atmospheric conditions. This eliminates optical distortion while preventing moisture from entering the goggles’ lens chamber. Shred introduced its NoDistortion technology in 2011.

=== Slytech NoShock ===
Slytech NoShock technology creates increased efficiency in shock absorption by pairing two protective foams that have different mechanical properties. A foam with a honeycomb cone structure is integrated into an adjacent matrix made from a foam that is stiffer and thicker. The foam that is stiffer and thicker compresses when subjected to impact energy.

Shred uses several different foams in its NoShock technology, selecting materials and their pairing based on the specific needs and uses of each product. Shred employs NoShock technology in its skiing, snowboarding and biking helmets. At the same time, Slytech uses a slightly modified version of it in its back protectors, protective vests, elbow pads, knee pads and other protective equipment. The brand developed the NoShock concept in 2013 and filed for a patent for it that same year.

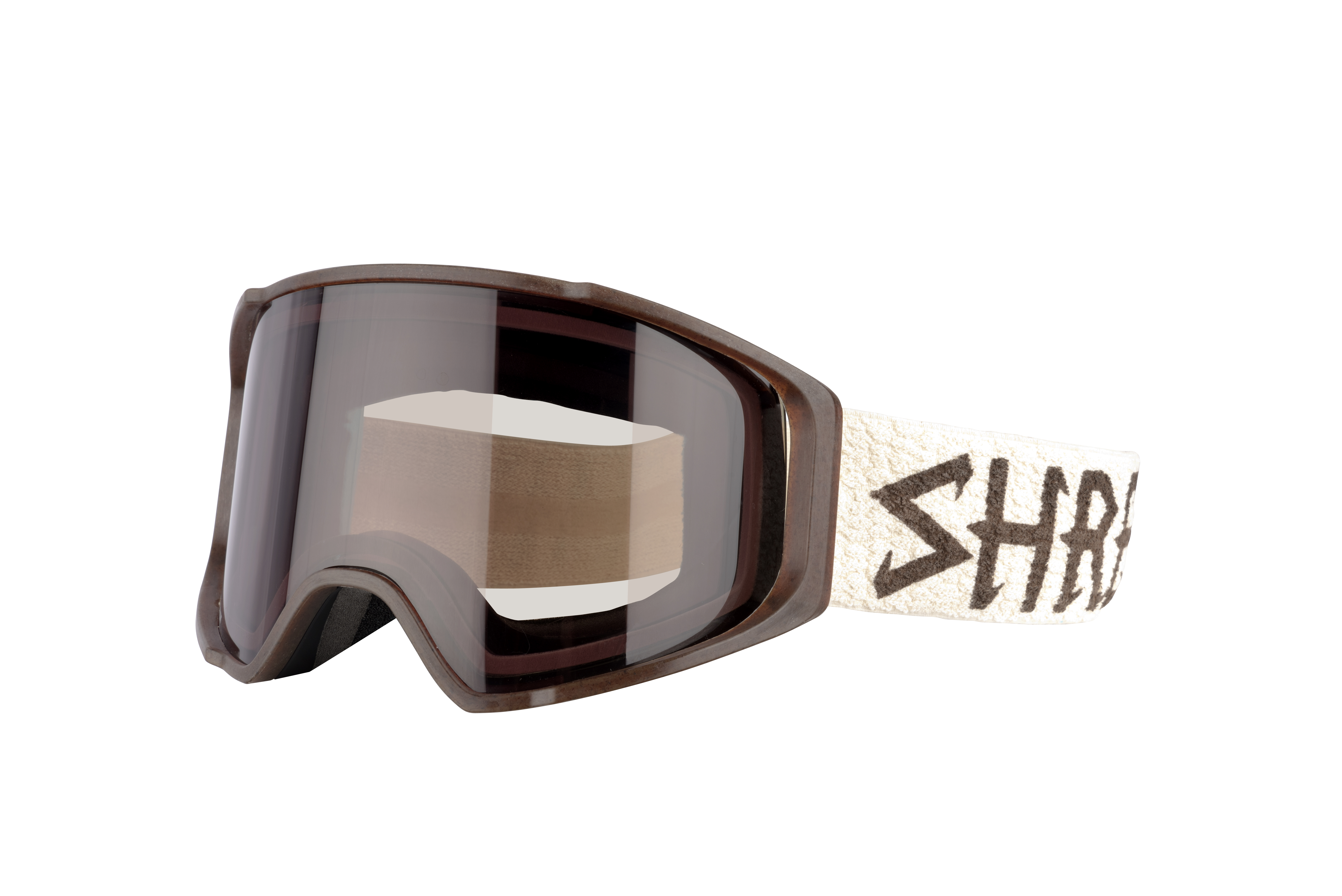
The Shred Simplify Natural goggle uses reclaimed, recycled, and organic materials, including content recycled from the snowboard manufacturing process.

== Philanthropy ==
In 2017, Shred partnered with Protect Our Winters, a climate advocacy group that focuses on the winter sports community. Shred donates a portion of its proceeds to POW’s efforts to combat climate change and educate the public about its effects. Shred has also partnered with POW to develop a goggle that uses waste recycled from the snowboard manufacturing process.
