= Sadie Lipner Shulman =

American judge

Sadie Lipner Shulman (1891-December 23, 1998) was, along with Emma Fall Schofield, the first female judge in Massachusetts.

== Early life and education ==
Shulman was born in 1891 in New York City. She was one of two women the Boston University School of Law class of 1911 where she graduated cum laude.

== Career ==
She began practicing law after graduation, largely in family law. With her husband, Charles Shulman, she had a private law practice. She was Counsel for Boston Civic Service House beginning in 1913. In 1924, Shulman became the first woman to be appointed as an investigator of a divorce case.

In 1926, Shulman became the first female assistant corporation counsel for the City of Boston. She served in the position until 1930. She was appointed as a judge to the Dorchester District Court in 1930 by Governor Frank G. Allen, becoming the first woman in Massachusetts appointed to the bench with Emma Fall Schofield. She was sworn in on December 17, 1930 by governor Allen.

Shulman did not want to retire from the bench, saying it was where she was most happy. Her most controversial case involved sentencing the juvenile driver of a stolen vehicle to view the corpse of the pedestrian he killed. She thought it was successful, as none of the juveniles involved ever re-offended.

== Personal and civic life ==
Shulman lived in Boston. In 1953, she helped establish a scholarship for women who wanted to study law at Boston University and then later made a donation to construct a study lounge for women. The lounge was named for her. She was also active in a number of other religious and civic organizations.

Shulman was a delegate to the 1932 Republican National Convention and was the first female president of the Boston University Law School Alumni Association.

As a member of Boston's Jewish community, she responded to the National Recovery Administration's call to assist those suffering from the Great Depression. Her husband, Charles Shulman, led the campaign.

== Later life and death ==
In her later years, she would walk the halls of the nursing home in Johnson City, Tennessee where she lived, "sentencing" others who were there. At the time of her death, she had seven grandchildren and 12 great-grandchildren. Her funeral was held in Brookline, Massachusetts.

== See also ==
- List of first women lawyers and judges in Massachusetts
