= Lori St John =

American anti-death penalty activist

- Born: Lori St John; March 8, 1956 (age 69); West Hartford, Connecticut, U.S.
- Other names: Lori Urs; Lori O'Dell; Lori Ann St John
- Education: University of Connecticut (BS); New England School of Law; Rutgers Law School
- Occupations: Anti-death penalty activist lawyer
- Notable work: The Corruption of Innocence (2013)
- Spouse(s): Walter K. Urs 1981-1995; Joseph O'Dell 1997 (6 hours)

Lori St John, also known as Lori Urs, is an American advocate against wrongful death penalty decisions. In addition, she is a certified public accountant and author.

In the early 1990s, St John studied law at the New England School of Law and later at Rutgers School of Law.

In the 1990s, she led a determined public relations effort to prevent the execution of convicted murderer Joseph Roger O’Dell. Her public relations campaign in the media drew widespread international support, particularly from the Italian city of Palermo, as well as from Mother Teresa and Pope John Paul II and the Italian and European parliaments, who petitioned unsuccessfully for O'Dell not to be executed. She was an investigator on O'Dell's legal team. She married the convicted murderer hours before his execution, partly in an effort to gain control of evidence. The marriage was officiated by a death row chaplain, with vows exchanged between bars of the cell, and the newlyweds were not permitted to touch for security reasons. Soon thereafter, before being executed by lethal injection on July 23, 1997, O'Dell pledged to love his bride "throughout eternity."

Her efforts pushed for greater use of DNA profiling in capital crimes cases. Her advocacy generated serious interest on the World Wide Web as well as in the nation of Italy, where the 1997 execution of O'Dell was watched by millions of television viewers. According to an account in the Los Angeles Times, O'Dell became the "unofficial martyr of Italy's campaign against capital punishment in the rest of the world." O'Dell was buried in the city of Palermo, Italy, even though he had never visited there.

In 1998, she was briefly in the news when she helped secure the release of her teenage daughter, who was being held hostage.
