= Sabita Singh =

American judge

Associate Justice of the Massachusetts Appeals Court
- Incumbent
- Assumed office June 21, 2017
- Appointed by: Charlie Baker
- Preceded by: Judd J. Carhart

Personal details
- Born: Saran District, Bihar, India
- Education: Penn State University (BA); Boston University (JD)

Sabita Singh is an American lawyer and Judge of the Massachusetts Appeals Court.

== Life and education ==
Born in Bihar, India, Singh came to the US as a child with her family and was brought up in Pennsylvania. She attended Pennsylvania State University, where she received her Bachelor of Arts in the Administration of Justice in 1987, and Boston University School of Law, where she received her J.D. in 1990.

== Career ==
Singh worked an attorney specializing in white collar criminal defense and business regulation in the White Collar Crime and Business Regulation Group at Bingham McCutchen LLP. She served as Assistant District Attorney for Middlesex County, and then as a Special Counsel for Criminal Rights Enforcement in the Office of the U.S. Attorney in Boston. As a prosecutor for the U.S. Attorney's office, she focused on human trafficking cases.

Sabita Singh is a Past President of the North American South Asian Bar Association ("NASABA"), an organization of attorneys in the U.S. and Canada who originate from India, Pakistan, Bangladesh, Sri Lanka and other nations on the Indian subcontinent.

On Oct. 25, 2006, the then Republican Massachusetts Governor Mitt Romney nominated Singh to be Judge of the Concord District Court. Her nomination was confirmed on November 15 by the eight-man Governor's Council. She was succeeded by Tejal R. Mehta in February 2018. In May 2017, Republican governor Charlie Baker nominated Singh to the Massachusetts Appeals Court and she was unanimously confirmed as an associate justice by the Governor's Council on June 21, 2017.

== See also ==
- List of Asian American jurists
- List of first women lawyers and judges in Massachusetts
