= Elizabeth Scheibel =

American lawyer

Northwestern District Attorney
- In office 1993–2011
- Preceded by: Judd J. Carhart
- Succeeded by: David E. Sullivan

Personal details
- Born: Elizabeth Scheibel; 1956 (age 69–70) South Hadley, Massachusetts, U.S.
- Party: Republican
- Education: Mount Holyoke College (BS); Western New England College School of Law (JD)

Elizabeth “Betsy” Scheibel (born c. 1956) is a Massachusetts lawyer who served as the first female district attorney in Massachusetts.

== Personal life and education ==
Scheibel attended South Hadley High School and then Mount Holyoke College. She was graduated in 1977 with a degree in psychobiology. She considered a career as a veterinarian. After seeing her future husband, South Hadley attorney Paul Boudreau, in law school she enrolled at Western New England College School of Law. She is a life-long resident of South Hadley.

While serving as district attorney in 1997, she was diagnosed with breast cancer. In 2016, she was appointed to the board of trustees for the University of Massachusetts. Previously, she chaired the board of trustees at Westfield State College. She is friends with John Scibak.

== District attorney ==
Scheibel spent 30 years as a prosecutor, including nearly 18 as district attorney. She began her law career at the Hampden County District Attorney's office in 1980. Eight years later, in 1988, she took a job at the Northwestern District Attorney's office. (Note: The Northwestern district covers Hampshire and Franklin Counties and the town of Athol).)

In 1993, then-Governor William Weld appointed the then-district attorney, Judd Carhart, to a judgeship. Scheible, then-Carhart's first assistant, was appointed to serve out the remainder of his term. She was sworn in at Mary E. Wooley Hall on the Mount Holyoke campus. She ran as a Republican in the next four elections and was never challenged for the post.

As district attorney, she had a staff of roughly 100 people and a budget of nearly $5 million. She prosecuted those involved in the suicide of Phoebe Prince in 2011. The Boston Globe named her a Bostonian of the Year for her work on the case.

In one of her earliest cases, she prosecuted Sean Seabrooks for stabbing his ex-girlfriend and their son. After he was convicted, Scheibel was invited to Japan, where Seabrook's victim's mother was originally from, and helped get Japan's first anti-domestic violence law passed.

She retired in January 2012.

== See also ==
- List of first women lawyers and judges in Massachusetts
