= John J. Dwyer =

American architect

John J. Dwyer (1856–1911) was an American architect.

He designed institutional buildings in the Hartford, Connecticut area. At least two of his works are listed on the National Register of Historic Places (NRHP) for their architecture.

He was born in 1856 in Hartford, "one of many children" of a carpenter/builder. He began in architecture as a draftsman for Oliver H. Easton. He also worked with John C. Mead. He served as "superintendent" of the office of J. C. Cady & Co. in New York.

He worked for some time with Barrett Bros., then opened his own practice in Hartford with an office at 235 Asylum Street, announced February 25, 1893 in Architecture and Building.

He is reportedly "quickly became the popular architect in Catholic circles."

Works include (in Hartford unless otherwise indicated):

- 228 Farmington Avenue (1892), a large house for Senator Patrick Garvan
- Cathedral Lyceum (Lithuanian-American Citizens Club, 1895)
- St. Patrick's School 7 (1896)
- B.P.O. Elks Lodge (1903) 34 Prospect Street in Hartford, Connecticut. Classical Revival, NRHP-listed.
- House of the Good Shepherd (1903, 1905)
- St. Michael's Church (1905)
- St. Augustine's Church (1909)
- St. Francis Hospital (a building or other work)
- St. Thomas Seminary (a building or other work)
- Heublein's Hotel (a building or other work)
- St. Mary's Hospital, in Waterbury
- St. Patrick's Church, in Bridgeport
- Mount St. Joseph Academy, West Hartford, NRHP-listed

He died October 24, 1911.
