= Glendora Putnam =

American civil rights activist

- Born: Glendora McIlwain Putnam; 25 July 1923; Lugoff, South Carolina, U.S.
- Died: 5 June 2016 (aged 92)
- Occupations: Assistant Attorney General of Massachusetts, Civil rights activist
- Spouse: Harold Putnam
- Relatives: 1 brother

Glendora McIlwain Putnam (July 25, 1923 – June 5, 2016) was a civil rights activist and the first African American woman to serve as the Assistant Attorney General of Massachusetts.

== Early life and education ==
Putnam was born on July 25, 1923, in Lugoff, South Carolina, to Simon and Katherine McIlwain. She had one brother, Luther, a Tuskegee Airman and a New York City police officer. Her parents moved north to provide better opportunities for the family, arriving in Massachusetts in the late 1920s. They lived in Methuen and South Lawrence, Massachusetts. Her parents were involved in the civil rights movement.

Putnam originally attended a junior college in the south but, after she was discouraged from applying to law school by faculty, she transferred and earned a bachelor's degree at Bennett College. She then earned a law degree at the Boston University School of Law. She was driven to attend law school by a desire to eliminate segregation and discrimination.

== Civil rights ==
Putnam became the first African-American woman to serve as an assistant attorney general in Massachusetts in the office of Edward W. Brooke, her law school classmate. In this role, she led the civil rights division. Putnam and Brooke had previously worked on civil rights issues for the NAACP. Putnam held the same position under Brooke's successors, Elliot Richardson and Robert H. Quinn.

Beginning in 1969, Putnam chaired that Massachusetts Commission Against Discrimination, saying it was like being "given a teaspoon to shovel out an ocean." She left the commission after seven years to become an assistant secretary for fair housing and equal opportunity in the United States Department of Housing and Urban Development. After returning to Massachusetts, she worked at the Massachusetts Housing Finance Agency and then on the advisory board to the Massachusetts Civil Rights Commission.

In the 1980s, she was chairman of the board of the Young Women's Christian Association, an organization that refused her admittance in the segregated south of her youth. In the early 2000s, she served as a Trustee on the Board of the YWCA Retirement Fund.

== Awards and honors ==
For her work in civil rights, she received the YW Boston's Academy of Women Achievers and Sandra B. Henriquez Racial Justice awards. She was also named a Living Legend by the Museum of African American History in 2012, the museums's highest honor.

Putnam received honorary doctor of law degrees from Bennett in 1991 and the University of Massachusetts Dartmouth. The Boston University School of Law awarded her the Silver Shingle Award for outstanding public service and the Massachusetts Black Lawyer's Association presented her with the Distinguished Achievement Award.

== Personal life ==
Putnam married Harold Putnam, a state representative in the Great and General Court. The couple later divorced. Putnam died on June 5, 2016, after a stroke.

== See also ==
- List of first women lawyers and judges in Massachusetts
