= B.P.O. Elks Lodge (Hartford, Connecticut) =

- U.S. National Register of Historic Places

- Location within Connecticut Location within the United States
- Location: 34 Prospect Street, Hartford, Connecticut
- Coordinates: 41°45′49″N 72°40′20″W
- Area: less than one acre
- Built: 1903
- Architect: John J. Dwyer
- Architectural style: Classical Revival
- MPS: Hartford Downtown MRA
- NRHP reference No.: 84000753
- Added to NRHP: December 23, 1984

The B.P.O. Elks Lodge is a historic fraternal lodge building at 34 Prospect Street in Hartford, Connecticut. It is a Classical Revival architecture building designed by John J. Dwyer, and built in 1903 for the local chapter of the Benevolent and Protective Order of Elks. The building was listed on the National Register of Historic Places in 1984 for its architecture.

== Description and history ==
Hartford's Elks Lodge is located South of Downtown Hartford, on the East Side of Prospect Street across from the back of the Wadsworth Atheneum. It is a 2 1/2-story yellow brick building with egg-and-dart moldings, and brownstone and limestone detailing. The interior features rich woodwork.

The lodge was built in 1903 to a design by John J. Dwyer, a local architect who is credited with a number of significant institutional buildings in the city. The lodge has one of the city's finest unaltered interior spaces of the period, with a series of paneled assembly rooms on the ground floor separated by arched and columned openings. The main staircase, ascending to the main meeting hall, is of dark mahogany, with a skylight providing natural light. The meeting hall itself is richly appointed in Baroque woodwork. Many original technical features remain in the building, including a large iron lever for dimming the hall lights.

== See also ==
- National Register of Historic Places listings in Hartford, Connecticut
