= Judith Nelson Dilday =

American lawyer and judge

Judith Nelson Dilday (born 1943) is an American lawyer and the first person of color appointed as a judge of the Massachusetts Probate and Family Court.

== Education and personal life ==
Dilday grew up in Pittsburgh, Pennsylvania. Her grandparents were originally from Alabama but traveled north during the Great Migration.

Dilday studied French at the University of Pittsburgh and was graduated in 1966. She earned several graduate credits in French at Millersville State College. After graduation, Dilday was a public school French teacher in Pittsburgh for four years before moving to Boston. She went on to the Boston University School of Law and was graduated with the class of 1972. While in law school, she met her husband, James Dilday. The couple went on to have children.

== Legal career ==
Dilday began her career in private practice and in government service. She rose to become the first black president of the Women's Bar Association in 1990 to 1991. She also worked in the law firm of Stern and Shapiro and then the Department of the Interior's solicitor's office. Dilday was a founding partner of Burnham, Hines & Dilday, the first law firm in New England owned by African American women. She was also the first black woman to work in the Suffolk County District Attorney's office.

Dilday was appointed to the Probate and Family Court in 1993 as a circuit judge. At the time, she was one of only four black women on the Massachusetts bench. In 1998, she was appointed as an associate justice in the Middlesex Probate and Family Court. Dilday retired in June 2009.

She has run mock trials for Chinese law students and taught English in Qiqihar, China.

== See also ==
- List of first women lawyers and judges in Massachusetts
