= Suicide of Phoebe Prince =

Suicide of bullied American teenager

Phoebe Prince
- Phoebe Prince
- Born: Phoebe Nora Mary Prince; November 24, 1994; Bedford, Bedfordshire, England
- Died: January 14, 2010 (aged 15); South Hadley, Massachusetts, U.S.
- Cause of death: Suicide by hanging
- Occupation: Student

Phoebe Nora Mary Prince (November 24, 1994 – January 14, 2010) was a British-Irish student at an American high school whose suicide led to the criminal prosecution of six teenagers for charges including civil rights violations, as well as to the enactment of stricter anti-bullying legislation by the Massachusetts state legislature.

Prince had moved from Ireland to South Hadley, in the U.S. state of Massachusetts. Her suicide, after suffering months of bullying from school classmates, brought international attention to the problem of bullying in American schools. In March 2010, a state anti-bullying task force was set up as a result of her death. The Massachusetts legislation was signed into law on May 3, 2010.

The accused stood trial in 2011. Sentences of probation and community service were handed down after guilty pleas on May 5, 2011.

== Background ==
Phoebe Nora Mary Prince was born on November 24, 1994, in Bedford, Bedfordshire, England, and moved to the seaside community of Fanore in County Clare, Ireland, when she was two. Prince attended Villiers Secondary School, a private school in County Limerick. She immigrated to the U.S. in the autumn of 2009 with her American-born mother and four siblings. Her mother lived in Boston for a few years. Her father, a British national, remained in Lisdoonvarna, Ireland.

== Bullying incidents and suicide ==
Having recently moved to the U.S. from Ireland, Prince was taunted and bullied for several weeks by at least two groups of students at South Hadley High School, following disputes with two girls in late December 2009. Her aunt reportedly warned school officials in August 2009, prior to Prince's enrollment at the school, to watch after Prince, as she was "susceptible" to problems including peer pressure and bullying. Investigations later found that Prince was in fact one of four girls bullying a student in Ireland in a dispute over a relationship with a boy. After the victim of that bullying was moved to another school by her parents, Prince wrote a letter of apology which was praised by the victim's mother, who blamed the bullying on peer pressure and the lack of action by the school authorities.

On January 14, 2010, three of the accused allegedly engaged in persistent taunting and harassment of Prince at school, in the library and school auditorium. One of the accused allegedly followed Prince home from school in a friend's car, threw an empty energy drink can at her, and yelled an insult. It was after this final incident that Prince died by suicide by hanging herself in the stairwell leading to the second floor of the family apartment. Her body was discovered by her 12-year-old sister. After her death, many crude comments about her were posted on her Facebook memorial page, most of which were removed. Her parents chose to have Prince buried in Ireland.

== Reaction ==
A meeting held at the school to discuss the problem of bullying within the school brought parents who stated that bullying of their children had been completely ignored by the school administration. Massachusetts state lawmakers sped up efforts to pass anti-bullying legislation as a result of this incident, and the measure was signed into law on May 3, 2010. Inspired by the Massachusetts bill, similar legislation was introduced in New York State. In efforts to promote national anti-bullying legislation, a "Phoebe's Law" has been proposed. In July 2010, the South Hadley school committee adopted a more comprehensive anti-bullying policy.

The six accused were subjected to bullying and death threats following Prince's death, and her father expressed concern regarding the treatment of the accused who had yet to face trial.

== Criminal case ==
On March 29, 2010, Northwestern District Attorney Elizabeth Scheibel announced at a press conference that two male and four female teenagers from South Hadley High School were indicted as adults on felony charges by a Hampshire County grand jury. Charges ranged from statutory rape for two male teenagers, to violation of civil rights, criminal harassment, disturbance of a school assembly, and stalking. One of the males charged with statutory rape was not involved in the bullying. Additional delinquency complaints were also filed against three of the four females as they were minors at the time of the incident. One minor was also charged with assault with a deadly weapon for throwing an empty can at Phoebe Prince. A separate delinquency complaint was filed against another of the three female minors for assault and battery against another girl at South Hadley High School (a girl who was attacked at school after appearing in a TV news report describing the bullying that took place at South Hadley High School). At least four of these six students reportedly were still attending South Hadley High School when the charges were announced.

In her statement, D.A. Scheibel directly contradicted previous claims by school Superintendent Gus Sayer that school officials had been unaware of the bullying at the school:

Contrary to previously published reports, Phoebe's harassment was common knowledge to most of the South Hadley High School student body. The investigation has revealed that certain faculty, staff and administrators of the high school were also alerted to the harassment of Phoebe Prince before her death. Prior to Phoebe's death, her mother spoke with at least two school staff members about the harassment Phoebe had reported to her.

Some bystanders, including at least four students and two faculty members, intervened while the harassment was occurring or reported it to administrators. A lack of understanding of harassment associated with teen dating relationships seems to have been prevalent at South Hadley High School. That, in turn, brought an inconsistent interpretation in enforcement in the school's code of conduct when incidents were observed and reported.

In reviewing this investigation, we've considered whether or not the actions or omissions to act by faculty, staff and administrators of the South Hadley public schools individually, or collectively, amounted to criminal behavior. In our opinion, it did not. Nevertheless, the actions or inactions of some adults at the school are troublesome.

Scheibel indicated that the investigation was ongoing and that charges against additional South Hadley students were likely. She urged schools to adopt anti-bullying awareness and training programs for staff and students and expressed the wishes of the Prince family to refrain from vigilantism and to seek justice only through the criminal justice system. "Now is not the time for retributions or reprisals," Scheibel said.

Two days after the District Attorney's news conference, school superintendent Gus Sayer again denied that school administrators had ignored the bullying of Phoebe Prince. South Hadley school officials released a statement that "we have taken disciplinary action with an additional small group of students and they have been removed from the high school." However, the school statement was unclear as to whether any of the accused individuals were actually expelled from the school. At least one news report stated that all of the accused were still at the school.

Three of the accused pleaded not guilty through their lawyers in Hampshire Superior Court on April 6. Another three, minors under Massachusetts law (under age 17), pleaded not guilty to delinquency charges on April 8 in Franklin-Hampshire Juvenile Court in Hadley. The three female minors were also arraigned as youthful offenders on the adult felony charges. Copies of the court documents with the full details of the case against the three female minors were posted on a CNN webpage. All six defendants waived their right to appear in court and did not appear at their arraignment hearings. All were ordered to stay away from the Prince family.

In May 2011, the case was resolved, after agreements to plead guilty to lesser charges. Five of the defendants were placed on probation, with several also sentenced to community service. The charges against a male student were dropped at the request of the Prince family.

== Settlement with town ==
Phoebe Prince's mother, Anne O'Brien, settled with the town of South Hadley in October 2010. She agreed not to sue or reveal details of the settlement for $225,000.
