= Wendy Murphy =

American lawyer

- Born: August 13, 1961 (age 65)
- Education: Boston College
- Occupation: Lawyer
- Known for: Handling legal cases related to child abuse and sex crime

Wendy Murphy (born August 13, 1961) is a lawyer specializing in child abuse and interpersonal violence.

== Education ==
Murphy received a BA from Boston College in 1983 and became a Juris Doctor from New England Law Boston in 1987.

== Career ==
Murphy began her career as a prosecutor in Middlesex County, handling legal cases related to child abuse and sex crime. Then, she switched to her private practice to focus on violence against women and children. Murphy is an adjunct professor of sexual violence law at New England Law Boston. Murphy was a visiting scholar at Harvard Law School from 2002 to 2003. Earlier, she taught Reproductive Rights and Technologies at the Massachusetts Institute of Technology. She is the founder and director of the Victim Advocacy & Research Group, which is a volunteer legal advocacy organization that, since 1992, has provided free legal services to victims in the criminal justice system.

She successfully sued both Princeton University and Harvard Law School for violating Title IX regulations “by mishandling sexual assault complaints.”

With co-counsel John Williams, she sued Yale University on behalf of Susan Daria Landino (formerly Burhans). This was another Title IX case and the first Jackson v Birmingham case filed by a higher education administrator rather than a sports coach.

When serial child rapist Wayne Chapman was to be released from jail, she represented his victims to keep him in jail. She filed an appeal with the Supreme Judicial Court asking for an emergency injunction preventing his release.

=== Criticism ===
According to author Stuart Taylor, Jr., Murphy is a supporter of the "guilty-until-proven-innocent" principle in the American judicial system.

In 2013, Murphy was sanctioned for violations of Rule 11 of the Federal Rules of Civil Procedure, with U.S. district judge Joseph R. Goodwin.

== Publications ==
- And Justice For Some: An Exposé of the Lawyers and Judges who Let Dangerous Criminals Go Free. (published by Penguin/Sentinel in September 2007; updated and re-released in paperback in 2014)
- How Title IX Won its Rightful Seat at the Civil Rights Table of Justice, and Why the Legs Are Still so Wobbly,
- Effective Gender Activism: An Exercise in Marginalization, in Martin, J.L. (Ed.), Racial Battle Fatigue: Insights from the Front Lines of Social Justice Advocacy, (pp. 191–208). (Santa Barbara, CA Praeger 2015)
- Traumatized Children who Participate in Legal Proceedings are Entitled to Testimonial and Participatory Accommodations Under the Americans With Disabilities Act, 19 Roger Williams Law Review 361 (2014)
- Book Review: Addressing Rape Reform in Law and Practice (Caringella), Sexual Assault Report, Civic Research Institute, pp. 67–68 (May/June 2013)
- Bullying and Harassment in Schools: Analysis of Legislation and Policy, in M.A. Paludi (Ed.), Women and Management, Global Issues and Promising Solutions, volume 2: Signs of Solutions (pp. 29–51). (Santa Barbara, CA Praeger 2013)
- Unpacking the Rights of Third Parties in Criminal Cases, Family and Intimate Partner Violence Quarterly, 5, No. 1, (Summer 2012)
- Sexual Harassment and Title IX: What's Bullying Got To Do With It, New England Journal on Criminal and Civil Confinement, 37, 305-324 (2011)
- Privacy Rights in Mental Health Counseling: Constitutional Confusion and the Voicelessness of Third Parties in Criminal Cases, Journal of the American Academy of Psychiatry and Law, 39: 387-395 (2011)
- Using Title IX's “Prompt and Equitable” Hearing Requirements to Force Schools to Provide Fair Judicial Proceedings to Redress Sexual Assault on Campus, 40 New England Law Review, No. 4, pp. 1007–1022 (2006)
- “Federalizing” Victims’ Rights to Hold State Courts Accountable, 9 Lewis & Clark L.Rev. 647 (2005)
- The Overlapping Problems of Prosecution Sample Bias and Systematic Exclusion of Familial Child Sex Abuse Victims from the Criminal Justice System, Journal of Child Sexual Abuse, Volume: 12 Issue: 2, pp. 129–132 (2004)
- New Strategies for Child Abuse Prosecutions After Crawford, ABA Journal, vol. 23, #8, pp. 129–133 (2004)
- The Victim Advocacy and Research Group: Serving a Growing Need to Provide Rape Victims with Personal Legal Representation to Protect Privacy Rights and Fight Gender Bias in the Criminal Justice System, 11 Journal of Social Distress and the Homeless, No.1, p. 123 (2001)
- Special Problems Regarding the Discovery and Use of Privileged Information, Massachusetts Continuing Legal Education, Superior Court Criminal Practice Manual, Spring, (1999 and update 2003)
- Minimizing the Likelihood of Discovery of Victims’ Counseling Records and Other Personal Information in Criminal Cases: Massachusetts Give a Nod to a Constitutional Right to Confidentiality, 32 New England Law Review, No. 4, Summer (1998) (recognized in “Worth Reading,” National Law Journal)
- Gender Bias in the Criminal Justice System, Harvard Women's Law Journal; 20th Anniversary Edition, June (1997)
- Legal Rights of Trauma Victims, in “Trauma and Memory: Clinical and Legal Controversies,” Oxford University Press, (1997)
- Debunking “False Memory” Myths in Sexual Abuse Cases, Trial, Journal of the Association of Trial Lawyers of America, (November 1997)
