= Daniel H. Rider =

Massachusetts politician (1912-1995)

Member of the Massachusetts House of Representatives from the 8th Norfolk district
- In office 1957–1968

Personal details
- Born: July 15, 1912 Baltimore, Maryland, US
- Died: January 28, 1995 (aged 82)
- Education: Brown University; Harvard Law School

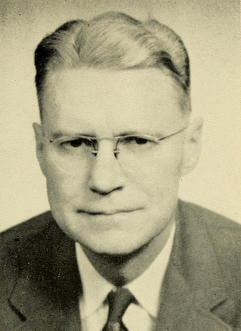
Portrait of Daniel H. Rider member of the Massachusetts House of Representatives

Daniel H. Rider (July 15, 1912 – January 28, 1995) was an American politician who was the member of the Massachusetts House of Representatives from the 8th Norfolk district.
