= Youth Enrichment Services =

Non-profit based in Boston, Massachusetts

Youth Enrichment Services (YES) is a non-profit based in Boston, Massachusetts that offers outdoor and enrichment programming outside of school to at-risk youth. Its primary program is to teach city youth to ski or snowboard using volunteer instructors.

The organization was founded in 1968 by Richard Williams as Operation Ski Lift as a way to expose inner city youths to the sport of skiing, and was incorporated as a 501(c)(3) in 1972. In early years it received grants from the City of Boston, but today is run on donations from corporations and individuals. It is supported by Olympic skier Ted Ligety.

Year round activities such as backpacking, canoeing, bicycling and environmental education trips to the Cape Cod National Seashore and to Swann Lodge in the Berkshires were added from 1975 to 2025. The current headquarters in a South End brownstone were built in 1987. In 2007 the YES Academy was founded to include Career Exploration, College Preparation, Girls Outdoor Adventure Leaders and Junior Volunteers programs. Today, additional programs offered by YES include ski and snowboard lessons, track and field programs, kayaking, mountain biking, and rock climbing.

More than 100,000 youths have been served by the organization since it was founded, with about 7,500 youths being served a year, mostly in winter. In 2015, 200 youths participated in the YES Academy, which is a 40% gain over the same period three years prior.

== YES Programs ==
Operation SnowSports:

- Youth Excel Through Tailored Instruction
- Cross Country Ski Program

Outdoor Adventure:

- Outdoor Adventure Sessions
- Outdoor Adventure Intensives
- City Ascent Climbers Program

YES Academy:

- College Preparation
- Career Exploration
- Junior Volunteers
- Girls Outdoor Adventure Leaders

== Notable alumni ==
- Michelle Edwards
