= Mount St. Joseph Academy (West Hartford, Connecticut) =

- U.S. National Register of Historic Places
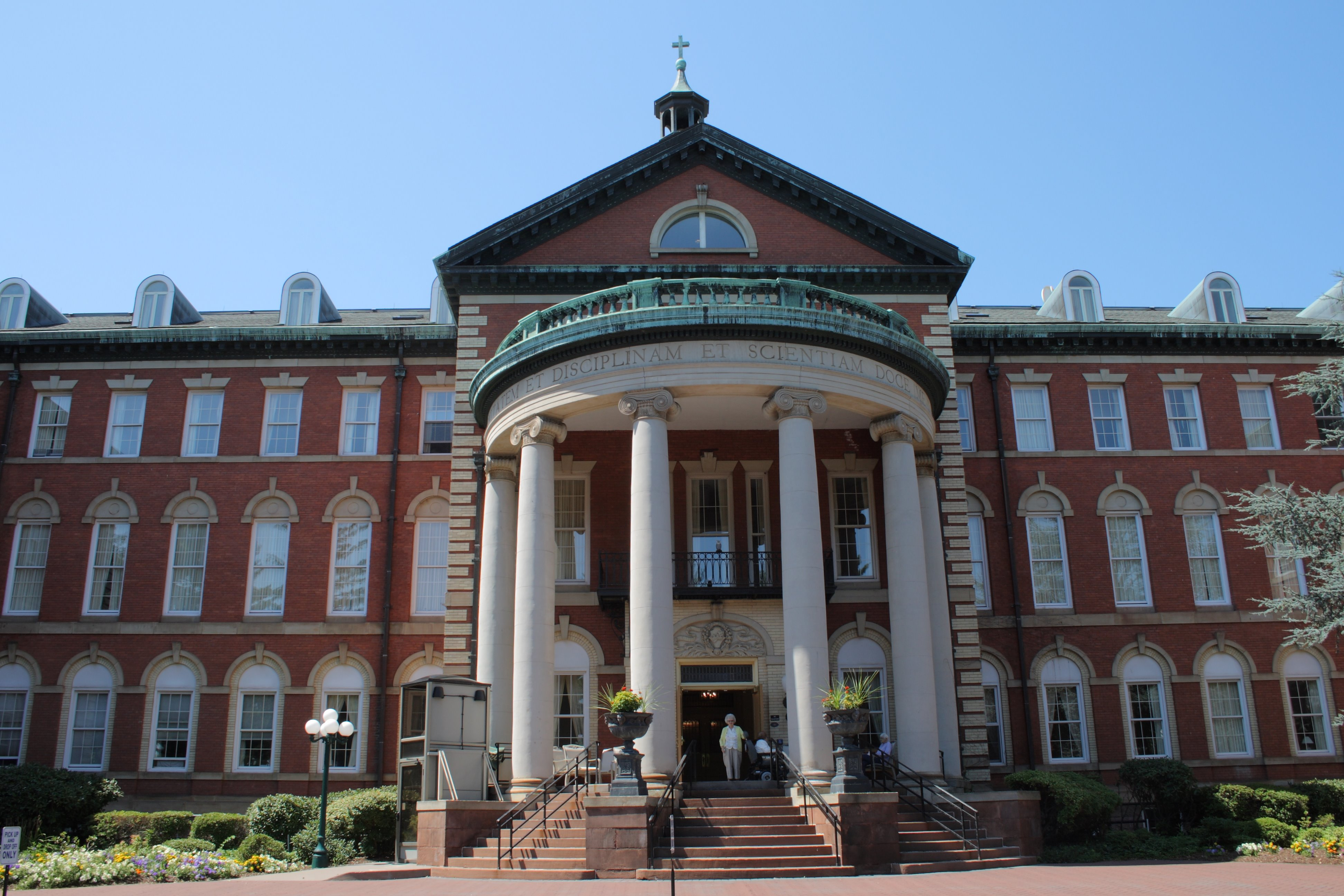
- Mount St. Joseph Academy in 2008

- Location within Connecticut Location within the United States
- Location: 1 Hamilton Heights Drive, West Hartford, Connecticut
- Coordinates: 41°46′5″N 72°43′26″W
- Area: 29 acres (12 ha)
- Built: 1905
- Built by: William O'Neil
- Architect: John J. Dwyer
- Architectural style: Colonial Revival
- NRHP reference No.: 83003561
- Added to NRHP: December 22, 1983

The Mount St. Joseph Academy is a historic former school building at 1 Hamilton Heights Drive in West Hartford, Connecticut. It is a four- and five-story brick and stone structure with Colonial Revival styling, designed by Hartford architect John J. Dwyer and built in 1905-08. It was operated by the Sisters of Mercy as a Roman Catholic school for girls, reaching a maximum enrollment of 565 in 1958. The school closed due to declining enrollment in 1978. The building was listed on the National Register of Historic Places on December 22, 1983. In 1996 the building was renovated for use as an assisted living facility, which presently (2013) is operated as Atria Hamilton Heights

== Description and history ==
The former Mount St. Joseph Academy stands on a landscaped hilltop at the southwest junction of Fern Street and Hamilton Avenue in eastern West Hartford. It is a large masonry structure four and five stories in height, with Georgian Revival styling. Its exterior is finished mainly in red brick, with limestone and buff brick used in the trim. It is laid out in an E shape, with the main spine of the E oriented north-south, and the legs of the E extending westward. The front facade faces east, and is divided into five sections, with a central projecting entry with gabled pediment and half-round columned portico, and slightly projecting end wings. The interior central lobby spaces have retained original features and finishes despite conversion of the premises from a school to assisted living.

The academy building was built in 1905-08, and is one of the major works of Hartford architect John J. Dwyer. It was built for the Sisters of Mercy, a Roman Catholic order, as a boarding school for girls. The order was founded in 1831 in Dublin, Ireland, and had established itself in Hartford in 1852. It promptly opened a school for girls, which moved to larger quarters on Farmington Avenue in 1874 and was then given the name Mount St. Joseph Seminary. Again needing a larger space in the early 20th century, the Sisters had this facility constructed. Originally designed with more expensive materials (including granite and marble), both the size of the building and its material costs were reduced to fit the Sisters' $300,000 budget. The school operated until 1978, when it closed due to declining enrollment.

== See also ==
- National Register of Historic Places listings in West Hartford, Connecticut
