= Anna Christy Fall =

American lawyer (1855–1930)

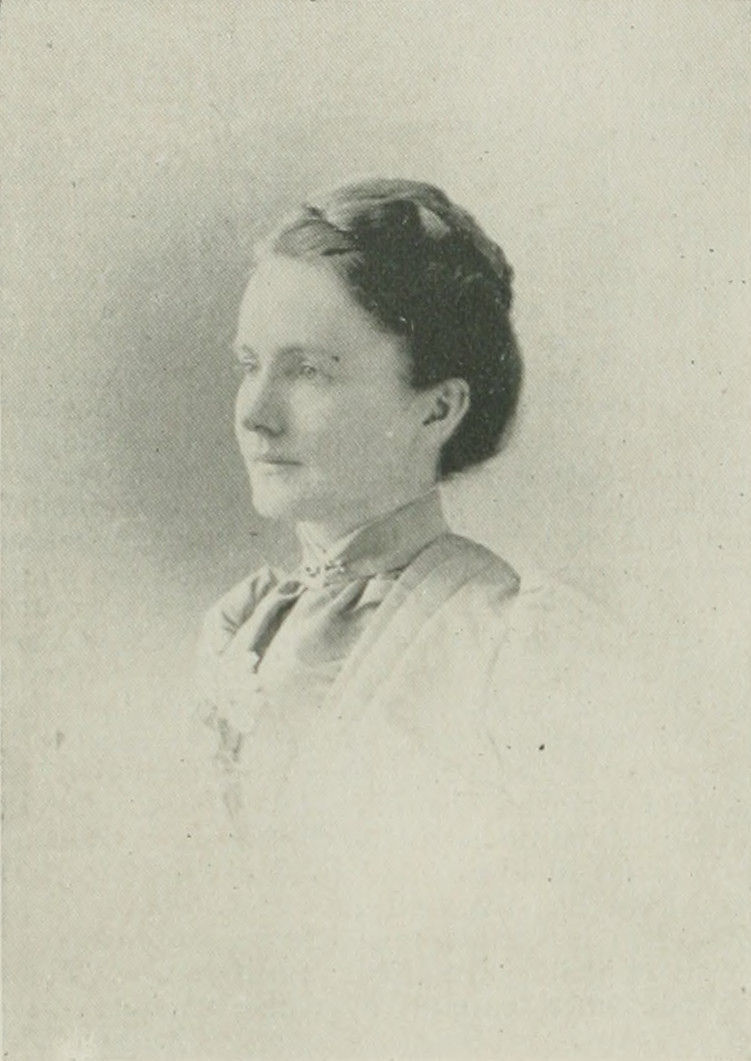
- Born: Anna Christy; April 23, 1855; Chelsea, Massachusetts
- Died: January 13, 1930 (aged 74)
- Education: Boston University School of Law
- Children: Emma Fall Schofield

Anna Christy Fall (April 23, 1855 – January 13, 1930) was an American lawyer. She was the "first woman lawyer in Massachusetts to plead a case before a jury and the first to argue before the Massachusetts Supreme Court".

== Early years and education ==
Anna Christy was born in Chelsea, Massachusetts, April 23, 1855. She was the daughter of William and Margaret Christy.

She acquired her early education in the public schools of that city, graduating from the Chelsea High School in 1873. Six years later, she entered the College of Liberal Arts of Boston University. There, she was graduated in 1883 with the degree of Bachelor of Arts. She at once commenced a post-graduate course of study, and in 1884 received the degree of Master of Arts.

== Career ==
In September 17, 1884, (Note: According to Willard & Livermore (1893), she married George Howard Fall in September 1885.) she married one of her classmates, George Howard Fall, of Malden, Massachusetts, who was then teaching, but who immediately after marriage commenced the study of law, and later became Mayor. Five years later, she began the study of law, having become deeply interested in it as a result of going into court and taking notes for her husband, who had meanwhile entered upon the practice of his profession in Boston, Massachusetts.

In March 1889, she entered the Boston University School of Law. While there, she was appointed by the facility as one of twelve candidates for class orator. In December 1890, while still a law student, she took the examination for admission to the Boston bar as the only woman among forty applicants. Twenty-eight of these, including Fall, succeeded in passing and were sworn in before the Massachusetts Supreme Judicial Court the following January. In June 1891, Fall graduated from law school magna cum laude.

During the following autumn and winter, she lectured in various parts of the state on the "Position of Women under the Massachusetts Law," and similar subjects. She was admitted to the Suffolk bar on January 30, 1891 and became one of three female lawyers in Boston alongside Leila Robinson-Sawtelle and Alice Parker Lesser. She practiced law with her husband at an office in Pemberton Square, but the two could not be in partnership as this was not permitted under the law. They petitioned the Massachusetts state legislature to amend the law which forbid contracts between married couples.

In November 1891, she won her first case before a jury, one of the ablest and most noted lawyers of Massachusetts being the principal counsel on the opposite side. That case was the first jury case in Massachusetts tried by a woman.

In 1898, she published a paper titled The Tragedy of the Widow's Third on the subject of estate administration, which favored men. This was considered largely responsible for the passing of the 1902 equal guardianship bill which was introduced by her husband.

She was actively involved in the women's movement, particularly speaking out in favor of women's suffrage,

== Personal life ==
She died January 13, 1930. She had two children and served for nine years on the Malden School Board. Her daughter, Emma Fall Schofield, was also a lawyer and the first female judge in Massachusetts.
