= Ted Ligety =

American alpine skier (born 1984)

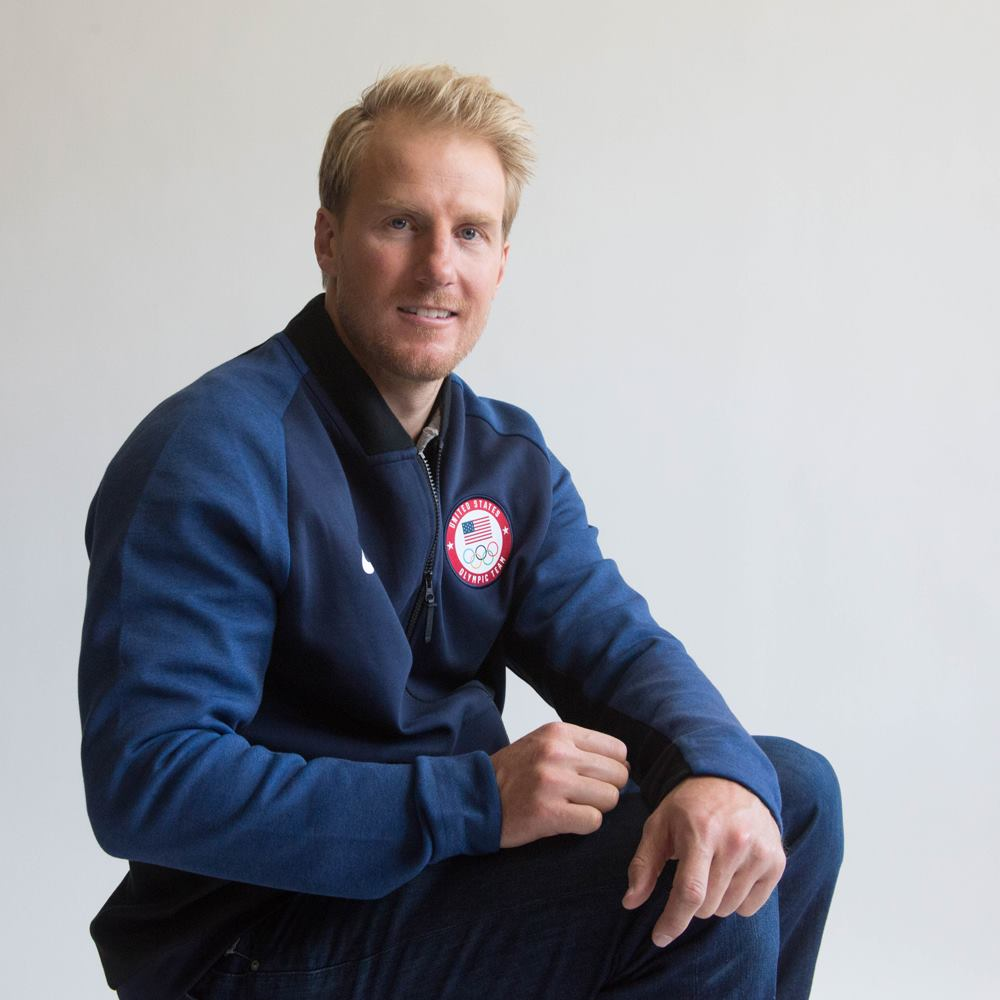
- Ligety in 2018

Personal information
- Born: August 31, 1984 (age 42) Salt Lake City, Utah, US
- Height: 5 ft 11 in (180 cm)
- Website: tedligety.com

Skiing career
- Sport: Alpine skiing
- Club: Park City Ski Education Foundation
- Disciplines: Giant slalom, super-G, slalom, combined
- World Cup debut: November 22, 2003 (age 19)

Olympics
- Teams: 4 – (2006, 2010, 2014, 2018)
- Medals: 2 (2 gold)

World Championships
- Teams: 7 – (2005–15, 2019)
- Medals: 7 (5 gold)

World Cup
- Seasons: 18 – (2003–2021)
- Wins: 25 – (24 GS, 1 SC)
- Podiums: 52 – (1 DH, 2 SG, 41 GS, 6 SL, 2 SC)
- Overall titles: 0 – (3rd – 2013)
- Discipline titles: 5 – (5 GS)
Medal record
Men's alpine skiing
Representing the United States
World Cup race podiums
Event	1st	2nd	3rd
Slalom	0	2	4
Giant slalom	24	7	10
Super-G	0	2	0
Downhill	0	1	0
Combined	1	1	0
Total	25	13	14
International alpine ski competitions
Event	1st	2nd	3rd
Olympic Games	2	0	0
World Championships	5	0	2
Total	7	0	2
Olympic Games
Gold medal – first place	2006 Turin	Combined
Gold medal – first place	2014 Sochi	Giant slalom
World Championships
Gold medal – first place	2011 Garmisch	Giant slalom
Gold medal – first place	2013 Schladming	Super-G
Gold medal – first place	2013 Schladming	Combined
Gold medal – first place	2013 Schladming	Giant slalom
Gold medal – first place	2015 Beaver Creek	Giant slalom
Bronze medal – third place	2009 Val d'Isère	Giant slalom
Bronze medal – third place	2015 Beaver Creek	Combined
Junior World Ski Championships
Silver medal – second place	2004 Maribor	Slalom

Theodore Sharp Ligety (born August 31, 1984) is a retired American alpine ski racer, a two-time Olympic gold medalist, and an entrepreneur, having cofounded Shred Optics. Ligety won the combined event at the 2006 Olympics in Turin and the giant slalom race at the 2014 Olympics in Sochi. He is also a five-time World Cup champion in giant slalom (2008, 2010, 2011, 2013 and 2014). Ligety won the gold medal in the giant slalom at the 2011 World Championships. He successfully defended his world title in giant slalom in 2013 in Schladming, Austria, where he also won an unexpected gold medal in the super-G and a third gold medal in the super combined.

Ligety planned to participate in the 2021 World Championships in Cortina d'Ampezzo but withdrew due to an injury, which prompted his retirement from ski racing in early February, 2021. He finished his career with 25 victories (24 in giant slalom and 1 super combined) and 52 podiums in World Cup competition. His Olympic giant slalom gold medal, 24 GS World Cup wins, 3 GS world championship gold medals and 5 World Cup titles put him among the three greatest giant slalom skiers of all time, according to Ski-DB.

== Early life and career ==
Ligety was born in Salt Lake City, Utah, the son of Cyndi Sharp and Bill Ligety, who are real estate agents. He grew up in Park City and began skiing at two and racing at ten. He attended The Winter Sports School and graduated in 2002. Ligety was named to the U.S. Skiing Development Team and won a silver medal in slalom in the Junior World Championships in 2004. He made his first start in a World Cup event during the 2004 World Cup season in the giant slalom at Park City. In the summer of 2004, Ligety and U.S. Ski Team head coach Sasha Rearick studied Fu Style Tai Chi. The next winter in the 2005 season, Ligety was added to the U.S. Ski Team full-time, during which he had four top-15 finishes in slalom, placing 24th overall in the discipline.

=== 2006 season ===
Ligety recorded his first World Cup podium finish in the first slalom of the season, at Beaver Creek in December, and followed that up with a second and a third during the next three slaloms. Ligety's first major victory of his professional career came at the 2006 Winter Olympics in Turin, held at Sestriere. Ligety won the gold medal in the men's combined event, a major upset after the two racers favored to win the event failed to finish the slalom portion. At age 21, he became the first American man to win an Olympic gold medal in alpine skiing in a dozen years, since Tommy Moe won the downhill at the 1994 Winter Olympics in Lillehammer, Norway. Ligety also became just the fourth American male skier to win Olympic gold, along with Moe, Phil Mahre (slalom, 1984) and Bill Johnson (downhill, 1984). At Turin, Ligety also participated in the giant slalom and the slalom, but he failed to complete either event. Following his Olympic victory in the combined, Ligety recorded his first World Cup victory, a win in the giant slalom in Yongpyeong, South Korea. He finished ninth in the overall World Cup standings for the year, marking the first time that three American men had placed in the top 10 (along with Bode Miller in third and Daron Rahlves in fourth), despite the fact that he did not compete in downhill or super-G that year. - It was a little surprise that Ted Ligety's first win was in a giant slalom because he wasn't known as a good giant slalom racer (he had only placed in the top ten in one race before, being 8th at Sölden on October 23, 2005 - and he had bib-number 18, a number which is behind the top fifteen of the world; at that time he was far better in the slalom by finishing 3rd at Beaver Creek on December, 4th, and also at Kranjska Gora in December 2005, and indeed finishing second at Adelboden on January 8). On that March 5, he was only 8th-placed after the first leg (with a deficite of 1.13 sec. behind leading Davide Simoncelli but he was able to overtake all elite racers in the second leg). - It took long until he could achieve a second win (Kranjska Gora on March 8, 2008).

=== 2007 season ===
In the summer of 2006, Ligety changed his ski supplier from Völkl to Rossignol. With Rahlves' retirement, Ligety began to compete in all five events. However, he managed only two podium finishes during the season, a second in slalom and a third in giant slalom. Disappointingly, he had three fourth-place finishes, one in giant slalom, one in super combined, and one in the World Cup finals downhill, as well as a fourth-place finish in the giant slalom at the 2007 World Championships in Åre, Sweden, missing a medal by 0.07 seconds. He finished eleventh overall in 2007.

=== 2008 season ===
Ligety won his first World Cup season title in the giant slalom in 2008, and finished fifth in the overall standings. He won the final two giant slaloms of the year at Kranjska Gora and Bormio to edge out two-time defending champion Benjamin Raich of Austria for the season title. He also recorded four other podium finishes: a second and a third in giant slalom and two third places in slalom. In addition to his title, Ligety ranked seventh in combined and ninth in slalom. When the last giant slalom race was started on March 14, Ligety was ahead to Raich with a margin of 27 points, but in that actual race he was only seventh-placed after the first leg while Raich was second-placed. But Ligety did do a phenomenal best time in the second leg, becoming first ahead to Raich.

=== 2009 season ===
Ligety opened defense of his 2008 giant slalom title with a third-place finish in Sölden, Austria, and then placed second at Beaver Creek, Colorado. At the 2009 World Championships in Val d'Isère, France, Ligety took the bronze medal in the giant slalom, then won his fourth World Cup race at Kranjska Gora. He finished the season with another second at the finals in Åre, Sweden, which left him ranked third in GS and ninth overall for the season. Taking the bronze medal on February 13 (and starting with bib number 1) he had to strain because he was only ninth-placed (with a deficit of 1.71 sec. to leading Carlo Janka) after the first leg. In the second leg he took the lead and remained there until Benjamin Raich overtook him with a margin of 0.28 sec.

=== 2010 season ===
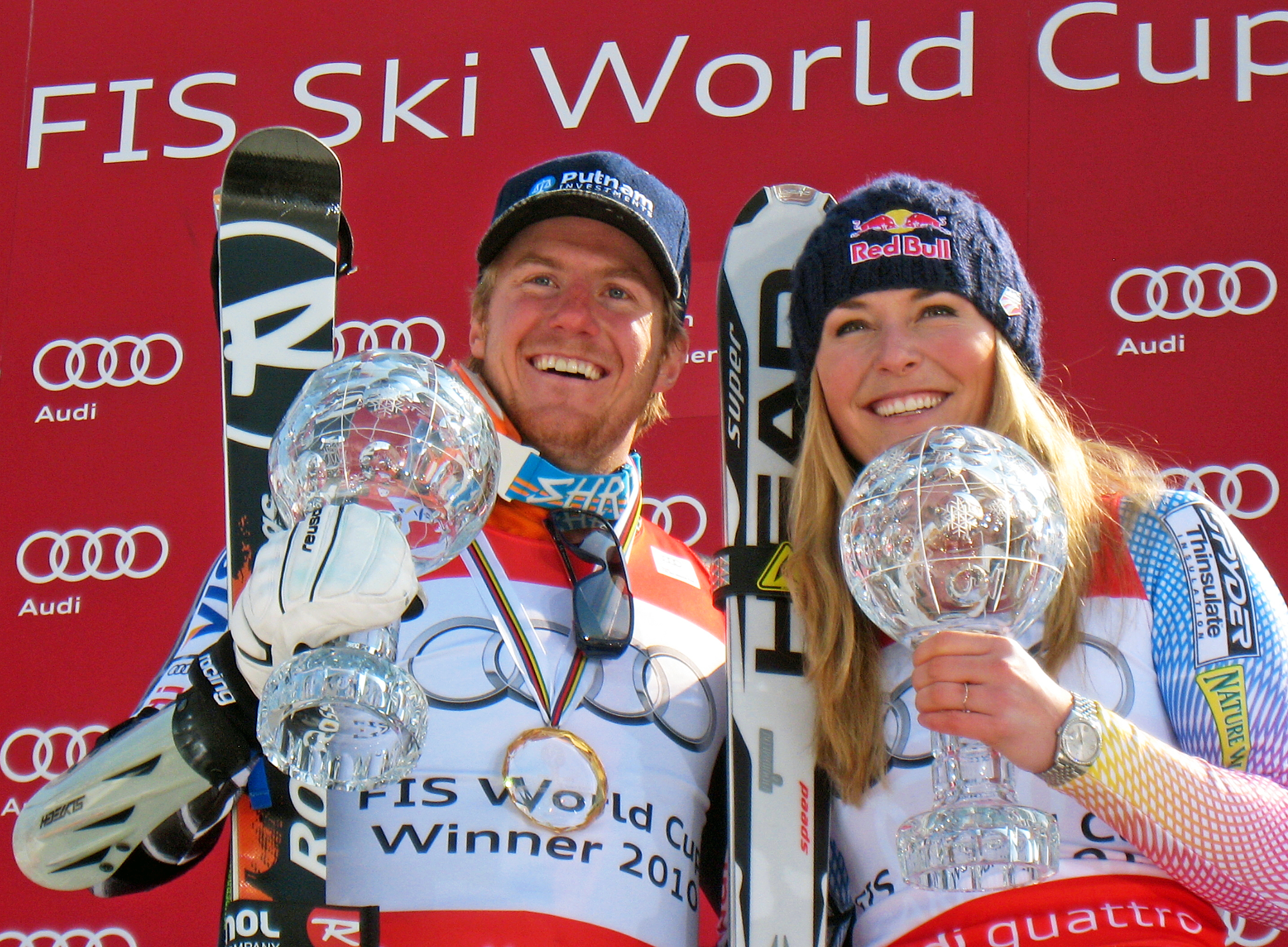
World Cup champs, 2010: Ligety and Lindsey Vonn

Ligety notched his fifth World Cup victory in January, his third win at Kranjska Gora in as many seasons. At the finals in Garmisch, Germany, he finished on the podium to secure his second season title in giant slalom, and finished seventh in the overall standings.

At the 2010 Vancouver Olympics at Whistler, he finished ninth in the giant slalom (on February 23, he was eighth-placed after the first leg, 0.60 sec. behind leading Carlo Janka, but he couldn't do better in the second leg) and fifth in the super combined on February 21. He was fifteenth in the downhill portion and first in the one slalom run, to finish a half-second out of the medals. In the "special slalom" race (held on February 27; he had bib number 16), only a brief time elapsed when he came out of the course in the first leg.

=== 2011 season ===
After racing for four seasons on Rossignol skis, Ligety switched his equipment supplier to Head in the summer of 2010, as fellow American champions Lindsey Vonn and Bode Miller did in previous seasons. Ligety won his sixth World Cup race in December 2010, his first win on home snow in the U.S., taking the giant slalom by a substantial 0.82 seconds at Beaver Creek, Colorado, the site of his first podium five years earlier. It was the first World Cup victory in the U.S. (and North America) by an American male in four years; the last was by Bode Miller in the downhill at Beaver Creek in December 2006. Six days later, Ligety won the next GS race in Val d'Isère, France, by over a full second. He won his third consecutive GS race at Alta Badia, Italy, the following week.

In February he won his first world championship, taking gold in the giant slalom at the 2011 World Championships in Garmisch-Partenkirchen, Germany. Fourth after the first run, Ligety won by 0.08 seconds over Cyprien Richard of France. He won his third season title in giant slalom in 2011.

=== 2012 season ===
Even though Ligety was able to win three giant slalom races during the season, he was dethroned as the discipline champion by the overall champion, Austria's Marcel Hirscher. Before the last giant slalom race on March 17 at Schladming, Hirscher led the giant slalom standings by a margin of 605 points versus Ligety's 513 points, leading Ligety by 92 points. In the first leg, Ligety fell but was able to finish the course, falling 11.16 seconds behind the leader Hannes Reichelt. Despite the fastest time in the second leg, this deficit all but guaranteed that Herscher would emerge victorious in the standings.

=== 2013 season ===
Ligety was very skeptical of the new FIS rules for the giant slalom, and cited David Dodge. Dodge stated that it was well known that if one tipped the new ski 7° more it would have the same turning radius than the old 27m ski. The greater knee angulation would then increase the risk of injury. Doubts if the new rules would affect his level of skiing didn't last long as Ligety won the first race of the season in Soelden by a huge margin of 2.75 seconds over Manfred Moelgg who finished second. The season turned out to be the best in Ligety's career as he finished on podium in all eight giant slalom races of the season and winning six of them. That feat helped him to regain the discipline title. In overall standings Ligety finished on the career best 3rd place.

Ligety made his season even more impressive by winning three gold medals at the World Championships in Schladming. The first gold he won surprisingly in super-G race which was his first victory in the discipline in an international level. Ligety then won also the super combined event and successfully defended his title in the giant slalom. It was the first time in 45 years that one male skier won three gold medals in one championships.

=== 2014 season ===
Ligety won three giant slalom races prior to the 2014 Olympics in Sochi. On January 17, Ligety gained his 20th World Cup victory with a win in the super combined event in Wengen, his first (and only) World Cup win outside the giant slalom discipline.

Entering the Olympics, Ligety was considered a favorite to medal in three disciplines, but he finished 12th in the super combined and 14th in the super-G. While under pressure as a big favorite to win a gold in the giant slalom, Ligety began his first run with an attacking attitude and established a 0.93 second lead. He skied carefully on the second run to secure the first-ever gold medal for an American man in the discipline. Ligety became the first male American ski racer in history to win two Olympic gold medals in his career.

After the Olympics, Ligety won the giant slalom in Kranjska Gora for a record sixth time. At the season finals in Lenzerheide he surprisingly finished second, tied with Christof Innerhofer, in the downhill race. The result was his first ever podium in downhill and made him only the second American skier in history, after Bode Miller, to podium in all five alpine skiing disciplines. Ligety then finished fifth in the final super-G race. Before the last giant slalom race of the season Ligety was trailing Marcel Hirscher by 50 points for the discipline title. However, Ligety won the race on March 15 with a 0,03 second advantage over Alexis Pinturault and with Hirscher finishing fourth, both skiers ended the season tied with 560 points. The Crystal Globe was however awarded to Ligety who won due to having five discipline victories during the season compared to Hirscher's two. This was the fifth giant slalom title in Ligety's career. - Hirscher lost the title in that last giant slalom race with a deficit of 0.01 seconds to the 3rd place (achieved by Felix Neureuther) which is awarded 60 points, therefore 10 points more than fourth place.

=== 2015 season ===
The 2015 FIS Alpine Skiing World Cup season was less successful for Ligety as he was able to win just one race and finished third in the giant slalom standings and eleventh overall. At the FIS Alpine World Ski Championships 2015 held in Beaver Creek, Ligety finished third in the super combined event despite being ranked 29th after the downhill leg. In the giant slalom, placed fifth after the first run and trailing by 0.24 to then leading favorite Marcel Hirscher, Ligety skied impressively in the second run, to finish 0.45 ahead of Hirscher and secure his third consecutive world title in the discipline.

=== 2016 season ===
Ligety won the season's first race, a giant slalom on October 25, 2015, at Sölden, Austria. While training on January 27 at Oberjoch, Germany, he tore the ACL in his right knee, which required surgery and ended his 2016 season.

=== 2017 season ===
Ligety returned to World Cup racing in October 2016, competing in the prelude (giant slalom) race at Sölden on October 23 (finishing 5th), and he finished 11th in the giant slalom on December 4 at Val d'Isère. He was not able to finish the following two giant slalom races due to back pain, and subsequently returned to the United States. On January 17, Ligety announced he would have season-ending back surgery.

=== 2018 season ===
Ligety returned to the World Cup racing late in 2017, competing in the Super G at Lake Louise on November 26 (DNF), and finishing seventh in the giant slalom on December 3, 2017, at Beaver Creek. He went on to compete at the FIS World Cup events in Garmisch-Partenkirchen, Wengen, Adelboden, Alta Badia, and Val d`Isere.

Ligety was named to the US Olympic team on January 6, 2018 to compete in the combined, Super G, giant slalom, and slalom races at the PyeongChang Olympics. He came in fifth in the men's combined event, but following a disappointing finish in the giant slalom, he decided to skip the slalom event and leave South Korea early to focus on the World Cup.

=== Other achievements ===
Ligety has won six national championships, putting him behind the all-time record of nine, held by Bode Miller and Tiger Shaw.

Following his Olympic gold medal at Turin, he started Shred Optics in 2006; Ligety designs all the products and uses them himself. The company produces ski goggles, sunglasses, and helmets.

Ligety served as the Director of Skiing for the now-bankrupt Mt. Holly Club, a private luxury ski and golf resort in southwestern Utah. It is located in eastern Beaver County, on the site of the former Elk Meadows ski area (1971–84).

== World Cup results ==
=== Season titles ===
- 5 titles – 5 Giant slalom + 1 Combined unofficial

Season	Discipline
2008	Giant slalom
2010	Giant slalom
2011	Giant slalom
2013	Giant slalom
2014	Giant slalom
2014	Combined ^{A}

^{A} Unofficial, tied with Alexis Pinturault
Ingemar Stenmark is the only racer with more GS season titles (8).

=== Season standings ===
Season	Age	Overall	Slalom	Giant slalom	Super-G	Downhill	Combined
2004	19	132	54	—	—	—	—
2005	20	62	24	—	—	—	—
2006	21	9	4	12	—	—	13
2007	22	11	15	8	—	35	11
2008	23	5	9	1	40	—	7
2009	24	9	22	3	21	—	44
2010	25	7	24	1	14	—	14
2011	26	9	24	1	35	58	13
2012	27	9	15	2	34	47	13
2013	28	3	19	1	7	—	—
2014	29	4	23	1	20	26	1
2015	30	11	39	3	39	58	11
2016	31	38	49	18	25	—	—
2017	32	84	—	27	55	—	—
2018	33	38	—	8	—	—	21
2019	34	51	—	20	47	—	13
2020	35	44	—	12	57	—	—
2021	36	121	—	41	—	—	—

=== Race victories ===
Although a GS specialist, Ligety is among the few alpine ski racers to have a World Cup podium finish in all five disciplines. Both in 2013 and 2014, he was the racer with the most victories that season and among the top three with the most podiums.

- 25 wins – (24 GS, 1 SC)
- 52 podiums – (1 DH, 2 SG, 41 GS, 6 SL, 2 SC)

Season	Date	Location	Discipline
2006	Mar 5, 2006	Yongpyong, South Korea	Giant slalom
2008	Mar 8, 2008	Kranjska Gora, Slovenia	Giant slalom
2008	Mar 14, 2008	Bormio, Italy	Giant slalom
2009	Feb 28, 2009	Kranjska Gora, Slovenia	Giant slalom
2010	Jan 29, 2010	Kranjska Gora, Slovenia	Giant slalom
2011	Dec 5, 2010	Beaver Creek, United States	Giant slalom
2011	Dec 11, 2010	Val d'Isère, France	Giant slalom
2011	Dec 19, 2010	Alta Badia, Italy	Giant slalom
2012	Oct 23, 2011	Sölden, Austria	Giant slalom
2012	Dec 6, 2011	Beaver Creek, United States	Giant slalom
2012	Mar 10, 2012	Kranjska Gora, Slovenia	Giant slalom
2013	Oct 28, 2012	Sölden, Austria	Giant slalom
2013	Dec 2, 2012	Beaver Creek, United States	Giant slalom
2013	Dec 16, 2012	Alta Badia, Italy	Giant slalom
2013	Jan 12, 2013	Adelboden, Switzerland	Giant slalom
2013	Mar 9, 2013	Kranjska Gora, Slovenia	Giant slalom
2013	Mar 16, 2013	Lenzerheide, Switzerland	Giant slalom
2014	Oct 27, 2013	Sölden, Austria	Giant slalom
2014	Dec 8, 2013	Beaver Creek, United States	Giant slalom
2014	Jan 17, 2014	Wengen, Switzerland	Super combined
2014	Feb 2, 2014	St Moritz, Switzerland	Giant slalom
2014	Mar 8, 2014	Kranjska Gora, Slovenia	Giant slalom
2014	Mar 15, 2014	Lenzerheide, Switzerland	Giant slalom
2015	Dec 7, 2014	Beaver Creek, United States	Giant slalom
2016	Oct 25, 2015	Sölden, Austria	Giant slalom

== World Championships results ==
Ligety has won seven medals in the World Championships, five of them gold. He won three of them in giant slalom, after a bronze medal in 2009 in Val d'Isère behind Carlo Janka and Benjamin Raich he won the GS world title in 2011 besting Cyprien Richard and Philipp Schörghofer. Ligety repeated as world champion in GS in 2013, ahead of Marcel Hirscher and Manfred Mölgg and again in 2015.

At Schladming in 2013, he became a triple world champion in giant slalom, super-G, and combined at Planai. Ligety became the fifth man in history to win three or more gold medals at one world championships and the first in 45 years, when Jean-Claude Killy won four in 1968 at Chamrousse, with the combined as a "paper race." Ligety is the first racer of either gender to win the super-G, giant slalom, and combined at one world championships.

Year	Age	Slalom	Giant slalom	Super-G	Downhill	Combined
2005	20	DNF2	—	—	—	12
2007	22	DNF1	4	31	—	DNF2
2009	24	DNF2	3	DNF	—	DSQ1
2011	26	19	1	DNF	—	DNF2
2013	28	DNF1	1	1	—	1
2015	30	21	1	9	—	3
2017	32	Injured: did not compete				
2019	34	—	11	—	—	DNS2

== Olympic results ==
Year	Age	Slalom	Giant slalom	Super-G	Downhill	Combined
2006	21	DSQ1	DNF1	—	—	1
2010	25	DNF1	9	19	—	5
2014	29	DNF2	1	14	—	12
2018	33	—	15	DNF	—	5

== Personal life ==
Through a Citi charitable program, Ligety supports Youth Enrichment Services, an organization located in Boston founded in 1968, that takes urban youth to the mountains and teaches them how to ski and snowboard. He is married and has three children, a son born in 2017 and twin sons born in 2020.

== Video ==
- YouTube.com – victory at Kranjska Gora (1.61 sec) – from Universal Sports – March 10, 2012
- YouTube.com – victory at Sölden (2.75 sec) – from Universal Sports – October 28, 2012
- YouTube.com – victory at Adelboden (1.15 sec) – from Universal Sports – January 12, 2013
- Bostock, Mike; Alexandra Garcia; Joe Ward; George Knowles (February 11, 2014). "Giant Slalom". New York Times.Audiovisual presentation of Ligety's style in the super-G.

== See also ==
- List of FIS Alpine Ski World Cup men's race winners
