= New England Law Boston =

Private law school in Boston, Massachusetts, US

Coordinates: 42.3508°N 71.0666°W

- Motto: Jus et Auctoritas
- Established: 1908
- School type: Private law school
- Endowment: US$40.5 million
- Location: Boston, Massachusetts, U.S.
- Enrollment: 1,189
- Faculty: 109
- USNWR ranking: 168th (tie) (2026)
- Website: nesl.edu

New England Law Boston (formerly New England School of Law) is a private law school in Boston, Massachusetts. Founded in 1908 as the Portia School of Law, it was established to provide legal education to women. The school received approval from the American Bar Association in 1969 and is a member of the Association of American Law Schools.

== History ==
=== Portia School of Law ===
The Portia School of Law started informally in 1908 when Arthur W. MacLean (1880–1943), a graduate of the Boston University School of Law and a professor at Suffolk University Law School, agreed to tutor two young women who were studying for the Massachusetts bar examination. At the time, few options were available to women seeking a legal education in New England. Soon afterwards, MacLean rented space at 88 Tremont Street, began admitting students, and took on a second faculty member. MacLean's wife, Bertha, named the school after the character Portia in Shakespeare's The Merchant of Venice. In the play, Portia disguises herself as a young man and impersonates a judge; she also ruins Shylock, the moneylender. The Portia School of Law was the only law school in the country exclusively for women.

The school was incorporated in 1918. By this time it had 91 students. The following year, the Massachusetts legislature granted the school the power to confer the degree of Bachelor of Laws (LL.B), and the school was reincorporated as the Portia Law School. In 1920 the school awarded its first LL.B degrees to 39 women. The school was one of the few that offered part-time enrollment, enabling working-class women to pursue their studies while supporting themselves.

In 1920, the school outgrew its space on Tremont Street and moved to a townhouse at 45 Mt. Vernon Street on Beacon Hill. The Portia Law School was granted the authority to confer the degree of Master of Laws (LL.M.) in 1926; five graduates were awarded the LL.M. the following year.

The Portia Law School was integrated from its earliest days. Blanche E. Braxton, who graduated in 1921, became the first African-American woman admitted to the Massachusetts bar in 1923. Another Portia graduate, Dorothy Crockett, became the first African-American woman admitted to the Rhode Island bar in 1932. The former site of the Portia Law School at 45 Mount Vernon Street is a stop on the Boston Women's Heritage Trail.

=== Admission of male students ===
The school began admitting male students out of financial necessity in the 1920s. In 1930, the school's first two male graduates received the LL.M. degree. From 1940 to 1950, the men's program was referred to as the Calvin Coolidge Law School.

As the school entered the 1950s it saw its student body shift from a student body that had a majority female population to a predominantly male student body. 1963 saw Portia Law School begin the process of applying for American Bar Association accreditation, and some of the steps the school took included restructuring its board of governors and launching the school's first law review. In 1969, the school changed its name to New England School of Law to coincide with its accreditation granted by the ABA.

Vice President George H. W. Bush at the 75th Anniversary of NESL

| Dean | Tenure |
|---|---|
| Arthur W. MacLean | 1908–1943 |
| W. Chesley York | 1943–1952 |
| Margaret H. Bauer | 1952–1962 |
| Guy V. Slade | 1962–1966 |
| Walter J. Kozuch Jr. | 1966–1971 |
| Robert E. O'Toole | 1971–1974 |
| Colin W. Gillis | 1974–1978 |
| Thomas C. Fischer | 1978–1983 |
| Timothy J. Cronin | 1983–1988 |
| John F. O'Brien | 1988–2020 |
| Scott Brown | 2021 |
| Lisa R. Freudenheim | 2021–2023 |
| Allison M. Dussias | 2023–2025 |
| James H. Kennedy III (Acting) | 2025-Present |

As New England Law neared its 75th anniversary, new programs were started, the first was the creation of Law Day in 1970 and then the opening of its clinical law services office in 1971. The clinical law services program is performed by the law students providing representation to those who did not have the economic means to seek paid legal assistance. In 1980, New England moved into its current location; which is located in the Boston Theater District neighborhood. George H. W. Bush was the keynote speaker at the 75th anniversary of New England Law.

In the 1980s, the school started a program that arranged for students to study abroad and work with former Soviet Bloc nations to develop their own legal systems. New England Law also became a co-founder of the Consortium for Innovative Legal Education; which allows students to study abroad at countries throughout the world.

In 1996, New England Law students worked with Office of the Prosecutor of the International Criminal Tribunals by providing legal research and analysis for war crimes in Rwanda and the former nation of Yugoslavia. New England Law received membership from the Association of American Law Schools in 1998. In 2002, New England Law expanded its campus through the acquisition of nearby buildings.

== Rebranding ==
In 2008, the school adopted the name New England Law | Boston, emphasizing its location in Boston. The change marked the beginning of the school's second century.

The school later updated its institutional branding, dropping the vertical bar from its name and adopting the styling New England Law Boston. The revised name is used in the school's current website and institutional communications.

== Campus ==
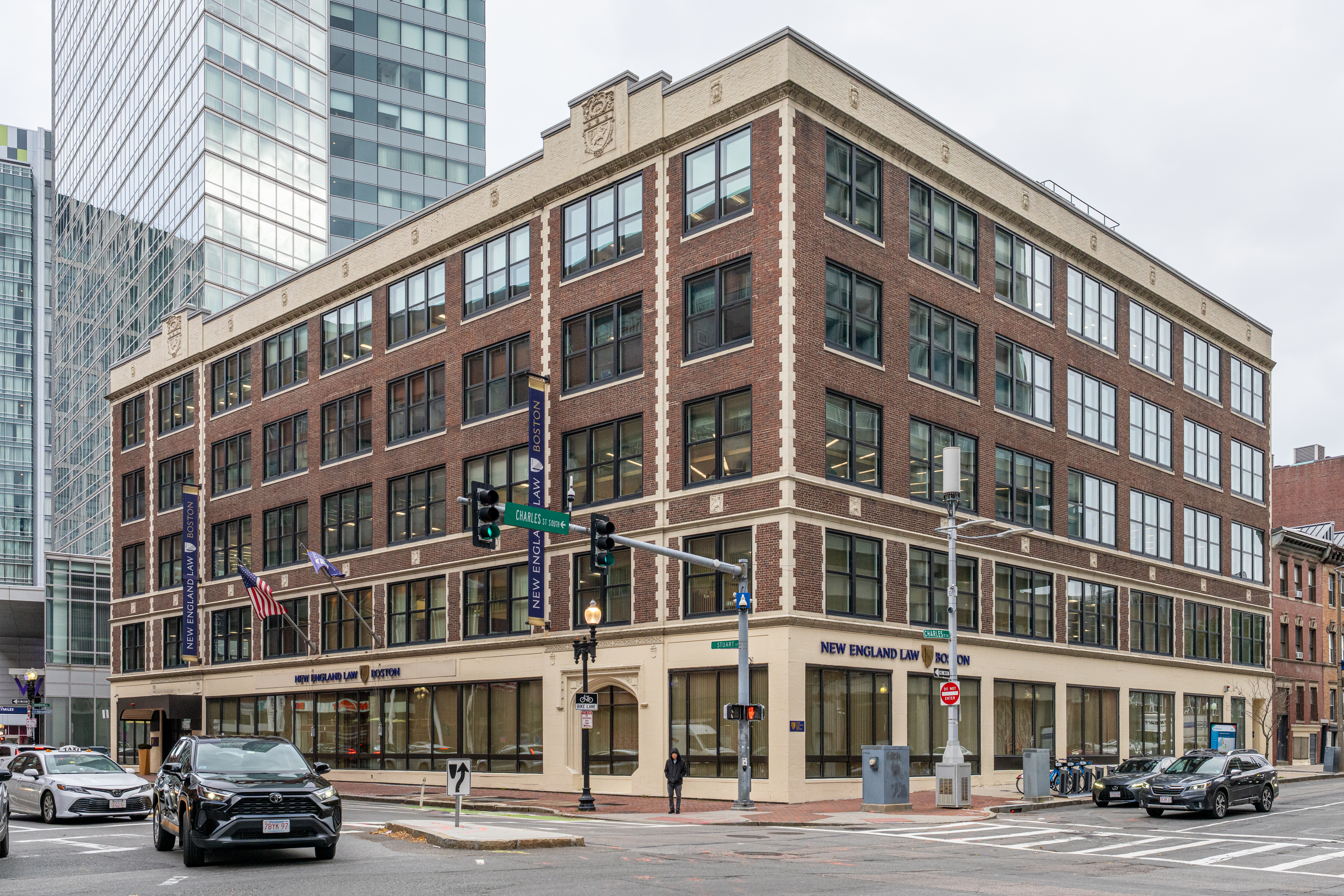
Main academic building on Stuart Street

New England Law's main campus is located at 154 Stuart Street in Boston's Theater District. The campus includes academic facilities and the school's law library, which supports the research and educational needs of students, faculty, staff, and alumni.

The library also serves other users, including area law students, attorneys with a valid bar card, and individuals using the Tufts Health Sciences Library for interdisciplinary research purposes.

== Academics ==
New England Law offers a Juris Doctor (J.D.) degree through four program formats: full-time, part-time evening, part-time day, and flexible study. The full-time program is designed to be completed in three years, while the part-time programs generally take four years. The flexible J.D. program allows students to complete the degree over a period of up to six years.

The school also offers a Master of Laws (LL.M.) in American Law, a full-time program intended for lawyers educated outside the United States.

== Accreditation and rankings ==
New England Law received approval from the American Bar Association (ABA) in 1969. The school is a member of the Association of American Law Schools (AALS).

== Cost ==
New England Law's estimated student expense budget for the 2026–2027 academic year lists total nine-month costs of $107,822 for day-program students living independently and $84,774 for those living with parents. For evening and part-time students, the estimated totals are $90,932 for students living independently and $67,884 for those living with parents. The budgets include tuition, fees, books and supplies, housing, food, transportation, and miscellaneous expenses.

== Employment outcomes ==
The American Bar Association's employment summary for the class of 2025 reported outcomes for 327 graduates. As of March 16, 2026, 179 graduates were employed in positions requiring or anticipating bar admission, 56 were employed in J.D. advantage positions, eight were employed in professional positions, and three were employed in other positions. Four graduates were enrolled in graduate studies, while 66 were unemployed and seeking work, six were unemployed and not seeking work, and five had an unknown employment status.

== Centers ==
New England Law has three academic and research centers: the Center for Business Law, the Center for Law and Social Responsibility, and the Center for International Law and Policy. The centers support research, academic programming, events, and practical experiences for students.

The Center for Business Law focuses on legal issues affecting businesses, including corporate governance, commercial law, securities practice, compliance, and intellectual property. Its activities include experiential learning opportunities and events involving business law practitioners and academics.

The Center for Law and Social Responsibility supports public interest and pro bono work in areas including criminal justice, immigration, education, environmental issues, and the rights of women and children.

The Center for International Law and Policy focuses on international legal issues through research projects, academic programs, events, and externships. Its areas of work include business and human rights, access to justice, post-conflict reconstruction, and transitional justice.

== Clinics ==
New England Law offers clinical and externship opportunities in which students work with real clients or legal organizations under professional supervision while earning academic credit. The school's offerings include the Public Interest Law Seminar and Clinic, the Lawyering Process, and placements in administrative law, business and intellectual property law, criminal procedure, environmental law, family law, federal courts, government law, health law, immigration law, land use law, and mediation and dispute resolution.

Students may participate in up to four clinics before graduation. The school states that it guarantees interested students a clinical or externship experience.

== Notable alumni ==
New England Law's notable alumni include:

- Blanche E. Braxton, first African American woman to be admitted to the Massachusetts bar;
- Robert Craven, member of the Rhode Island General Assembly
- Susan J. Crawford, the first woman to be appointed to the United States Court of Appeals for the Armed Forces, former Inspector General of the Department of Defense, and former Convening Authority of the Guantanamo Military Commissions
- Thomas J. Curry, former comptroller at the United States Office of the Comptroller of the Currency;
- Ken Croken, member of the Iowa House of Representatives from district 97
- Brian Darling, director of United States Senate relations for The Heritage Foundation;
- Joseph R. Driscoll, Norfolk member of the Massachusetts House of Representatives;
- Catherine E. Falvey, attorney and politician
- Mitchell Garabedian, lawyer best known for representing victims during the Catholic priest sexual abuse scandal;
- Virgil Hawkins, activist best known for Florida ex Rel. Hawkins v. Board of Control Supreme Court case
- Glenn Kirschner, prosecutor and television commentator;
- Joseph Mondello, United States Ambassador to Trinidad and Tobago from 2018 to 2021
- Wendy Murphy, attorney, professor, and author;
- James E. O'Neil, Rhode Island Attorney General, 1987 to 1993
- Joseph Petty, mayor of Worcester, Massachusetts;
- Karyn Polito, Massachusetts lieutenant governor;
- Mark John Richard Simpson, director of the United States Secret Service;
- Lori St John, anti-death penalty activist;
- Andrew Vachss, children's lawyer and author of the Burke novels;
- Martha Ware, Massachusetts district court judge; and
- Leonard P. Zakim, religious and civil rights leader in Boston
