= Noureddine Melikechi =

Algerian academic (born 1958)

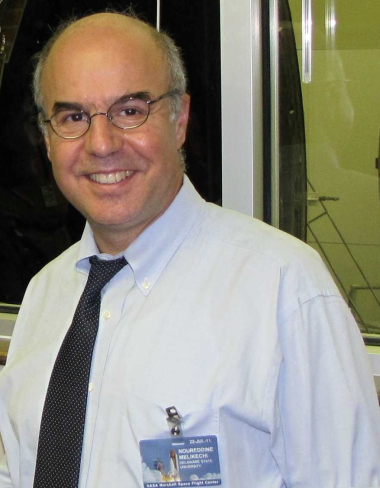
- Born: 1958 (age 67–68); Thénia, Boumerdès Province, Algeria
- Education: University Sciences and Technology Houari Boumediene
- Awards: Fellow of the Optical Society of America, Excellence Award for Youth Empowerment and Development in Africa, 2014, NASA Group Achievement Award; Mars Science Laboratory, 2013; Arfken Scholar-in-Residence; Miami University, 2013, International Science Award, US- Algerian Business Council, 2012, Academic Research Award,2012; Academic Research Award; DE Bioscience Asso., 2012; Delaware Ambassador to Mars; The Honorable Jack Markell, Governor, 2011
- Scientific career
- Fields: Atomic, molecular, and optical physics Photonics; STEM education
- Workplaces: University of Massachusetts Lowell; Delaware State University; University of Miami, OH; Vassar College, NY; University of Delaware; University of Toulouse, France; Univ. Sciences and Technology Houari Boumediene, Algeria
- Doctoral advisor: Professor Leslie Allen; Professor Edward E. Eyler

Noureddine Melikechi (born in 1958) is an Algerian atomic, molecular, and optical physicist, educator and inventor. He is the author of more than 125 peer-reviewed publications, six book chapters and 15 patents. He is a member of the Mars Science Laboratory, NASA’s largest Mars exploration effort to date. Melikechi is dean of the Kennedy College of Sciences and professor at the University of Massachusetts Lowell. He is currently serving as Interim Provost and Vice Chancellor of Academic and Student Affairs at the University of Massachusetts Lowell.

== Early years ==
Melikechi was born in 1958 in the town of Thénia, in the wilaya of Boumerdès, Algeria. After graduating from Thénia's middle school, the young Noureddine left his family home located on the Yahia Boushaki Boulevard for the Lycee Abane Ramdane in El-Harrach, Algiers. There he received his Baccalaureate in Mathematics. He enrolled at the University Houari Boumediene of Sciences and Technology of Algiers where he earned a Diplôme d'Études Supérieures in Physics. He went on to pursue graduate work in England where he worked towards his Masters and Doctorate in the laboratory of Professor Leslie Allen on optical coherent control of electronic dipole transitions in sodium atoms.

== Career ==
Upon graduating and following a postdoctoral research experience with Professor Allen, Melikechi joined the University of Sciences and Technology in Algiers as an assistant professor of Physics as part of his national service (1988–1990). Melikechi left Algeria for the United States in 1990 and joined the research group of Professor Edward E. Eyler as a postdoctoral research fellow. With Dr. Eyler, Melikechi worked on multiphoton excitation schemes in atoms and molecules, precise pulsed laser spectroscopy of few-electron systems, the generation of vacuum ultraviolet laser radiation, the development of Fourier-transform limited laser pulses. In 1995, he was appointed assistant professor of physics at Delaware State University (DSU).

At DSU, Melikechi founded the Applied Optics Center of Delaware (AOC-DE), a center dedicated to research, education and innovation initially focused on nonlinear optics and laser spectroscopy in liquids. In 2006, he founded a National Science Foundation (NSF) Center for Research Excellence in Science and Technology focused on optics. In 2009, this center was fused with a NASA University Research Center to form the Optical Science Center for Applied Research (OSCAR). Melikechi is also the principal investigator of the National Institutes of Health (NIH) – Maximizing Access for Research Careers and the DSU Idea Network for Biomedical Research programs.

Melikechi's recent research is focused on two major projects: (1) Developing sensitive optical techniques for the early detection of cancers (with a focus on epithelial ovarian cancer and prostate cancer). This work brings together laser spectroscopy, nanochemistry, and cancer diagnosis and has potential impact on disease prevention; and (2) Analyzing laser induced breakdown spectra of Martian oils, dust and rocks. The data is collected through the Chemistry Camera (ChemCam) instrument on board the 1-ton Curiosity Rover launched on November 25, 2011, and landed successfully on the red planet on August 6, 2012.

Melikechi is a Senior Member of the Society of Photo-Optical Instrumentation Engineers.

Melikechi is dean of the Kennedy College of Sciences and professor at the University of Massachusetts Lowell.

In 2026, he began his tenure as Interim Provost and Vice Chancellor of Academic and Student Affairs.

== Recognition ==
Melikechi is the recipient of numerous prestigious awards: DSU's President's Excellence in Research Awards (1998 and 2008), the 2005 SMART (Strengthening the Mid-Atlantic Region for Tomorrow) Capitol Hill Forum's "Executive Directors Collaboration Award", an award he received "In recognition for continuing efforts to improve and increase Science and Technology collaboration among the technical community in the SMART Region and to further the growth and development of the SMART initiative", The Department of Defense Small Business Initiative for Research Award (1997), The National Institutes of Health Small Business Initiative for Research Award (2002), the 2010 DSU New Castle Chapter Alumina Award, The 2011 "Appreciation Award" from the National Federation of Canadian Muslims, the 2012 Biotechnology Award, the NASA Group Award for his work on ChemCam.

In 2011, Governor Jack Markell of Delaware named Melikechi the "Delaware Ambassador to Mars" in recognition for his work on space science. and in 2013, Melikechi was named the George and Carolyn Arfken Scholar in residence by Miami University, Oxford, OH.

Melikechi is a Fellow of The Optical Society of America, now Optica; of the American Association for the Advancement of Science, and of the American Physical Society.

== Awards and honors ==
- 2016 - Fellow of the Optical Society of America
- 2014 – Excellence Award for Youth Empowerment and Development in Africa, the "African Society for Engineering Management"
- 2013 – NASA Group Achievement Award, Mars Science Laboratory ChemCam Instrument Development and Science Team, NASA
- 2013 – Arfken Scholar-in-Residence, Miami University, Oxford, Ohio
- 2012 – International Science Award, US-Algerian Business Council
- 2012 – Academic Research Award, the Delaware Bioscience Association
- 2011 – Named Delaware's "Ambassador to Mars" by Delaware Governor, The Honorable Jack Markell
- 2010 – Citizen of Science Award, El Moustakbel Youth Foundation, Algeria
