= Jacqueline Moloney =

American university chancellor

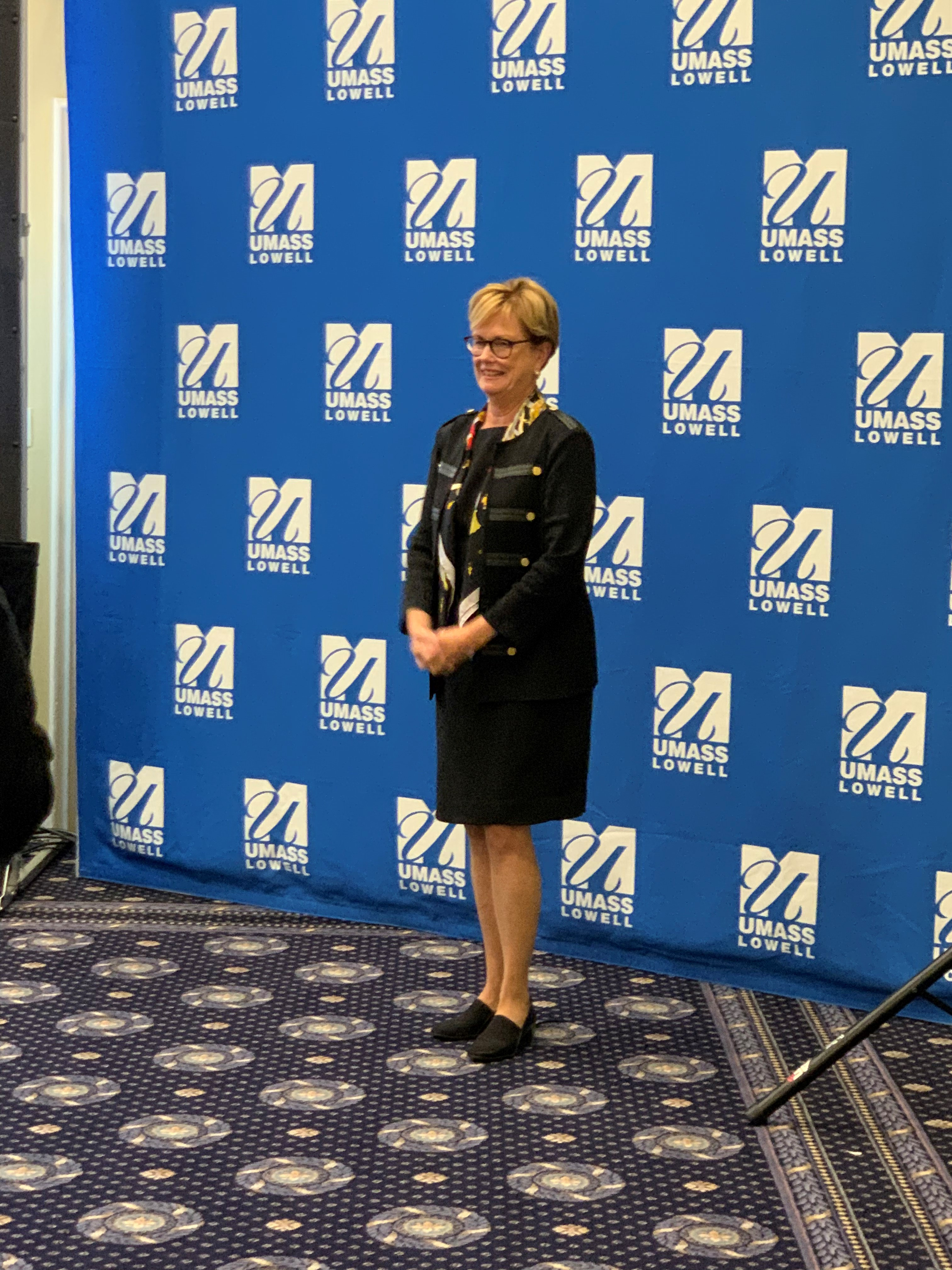
- Moloney in 2022

3rd Chancellor of the University of Massachusetts, Lowell
- In office July 1, 2015 – June 30, 2022
- Preceded by: Marty Meehan
- Succeeded by: Julie Chen

Personal details
- Born: Tewksbury, Massachusetts
- Salary: US$721,419 in FY 2021

Academic background
- Education: University of Massachusetts, Lowell (BA, Ed.D.); Goddard College (MA)
- Thesis: Reforming general education: A study of the elements and approaches used by college faculty to plan a cross-disciplinary curriculum (1992)

Academic work
- Discipline: Education
- Institutions: University of Massachusetts, Lowell

Jacqueline Moloney (born July 1953) is an American educator and served as the first female chancellor of the University of Massachusetts Lowell from 2015-2022. She has since returned to the UMass Lowell School of Education as Professor and Chancellor Emerita. She serves on the Boards of Directors of Enterprise Bank and Trust and is MKS Instruments.

Moloney’s career has focused heavily on expanding online education and promoting entrepreneurship. Her other research interests include access and inclusion in higher education, and public education.

== Early life and education ==
Jacqueline Fidler Moloney was born in Tewksbury, Massachusetts. She was the first in her family to attend and graduate college. She earned two degrees from UMass Lowell, a bachelor’s degree in sociology and a doctorate in education.

She also holds a master’s degree in social psychology from Goddard College.

== Career ==
=== Early career ===
Moloney began her career with Lowell organizations before going to work at UMass Lowell — then called the University of Lowell — as director of talent search and college prep in 1984. She was later director of admissions, director of freshman programs, dean of University College and director of the Centers for Learning.

In 1994, having received an Ed.D. that made her a “double River Hawk” (with two degrees from UMass Lowell), Moloney joined the faculty and was named Dean of Online and Continuing Education. She held the position until 2007, when she was named Executive Vice Chancellor.

=== Chancellor ===
Moloney was one of 20 people interviewed for the position of chancellor in 2015 by a 24-member search committee selected to replace Marty Meehan, who had been named president of the UMass System. The UMass Board of Trustees voted unanimously to appoint Moloney, with the support of the faculty senate and faculty union, on Aug. 3, 2015, making her the first woman to lead UMass Lowell.

In her chancellorship and career as a UMass Lowell executive, Moloney created an online education program while forging ties with industry and encouraging student entrepreneurs. She established the Division of Online and Continuing Education (now the Division of Graduate, Online and Professional Studies). She created the Office of Economic Development and Entrepreneurship. She established the DifferenceMaker program – an annual competition that rewards student innovation. Moloney also led the River Hawk Scholars Academy, which supports first-generation college students. Some 40 percent of new undergraduate students at UMass Lowell are the first in their families to attend college.

As executive vice chancellor and chancellor, Moloney led development of a 10-year strategic plan. During the plan’s implementation, from 2010 to 2020, the university built or renovated 18 buildings; moved athletic teams to Division I; improved its 6-year graduation rate from 51 percent to 70 percent; grew enrollment from 14,686 students to 18,400 students; and increased external research funding by $16 million. The strategic plan also included a focus on diversity, equity and inclusion efforts. Moloney oversaw creation of a Council on Social Justice & Inclusion to promote equity while confronting gender discrimination and sexual harassment.

As a UMass Lowell executive, Moloney oversaw a number of building and renovation projects. In April 2019, the university marked the completion of a $50 million renovation and addition to Perry Hall on North Campus. The updated building includes research labs for biomedical, chemical and environmental engineering, as well as bio-manufacturing and clean energy. The project also addressed repairs needed from a 2012 fire. The Massachusetts Life Sciences Center contributed $5 million to renovate the building’s third floor, which houses the biomedical and bio-manufacturing labs.

The university officially reopened its oldest building, Coburn Hall, in September 2021 following a $47 million renovation. The original building opened in 1897 as Lowell Normal School, which was founded in the city three years earlier to train teachers. Coburn Hall currently houses UMass Lowell’s education and psychology departments. The Coburn renovation included the restoration of a 1930s era Works Progress Administration mural of the city of Lowell, in the building’s ballroom, which had been covered by beige paint in the 1980s. The 64-by-10-foot mural was rediscovered in 2015. Its restoration was led by Gianfranco Pocobene, chief conservator of the Isabella Stewart Gardner Museum in Boston.

A comprehensive fundraising campaign launched during Moloney's tenure as Chancellor met its $125 million goal two years ahead of schedule, and ultimately surpassed that goal by $40 million.

Moloney was an advocate for sustainability, which has earned UMass Lowell the top designation in the state from the Association for the Advancement of Sustainability in Higher Education. As part of those efforts, the university created the Rist Institute for Sustainability and Energy.

After stepping down from her role as chancellor, Moloney, a tenured faculty member at UMass Lowell, has said she intends to return to the classroom right away, where she will focus on student development and leadership.

=== Oprah Winfrey scholarship ===
In November 2018, Moloney as chancellor interviewed talk-show host, producer, author and philanthropist Oprah Winfrey onstage in the third installment of the Chancellor’s Speaker Series. (Previous guests were Stephen King and Meryl Streep.)

The Oprah event proved significant for UMass Lowell: Moloney said it raised more than $1.5 million for student scholarships — a total that Winfrey matched. As part of the event, six UMass Lowell students were honored with the Oprah Winfrey Scholarship, given to students with a financial need who show a commitment to academic achievement. Winfrey received an honorary doctorate of humane letters from the university.

=== Awards and recognition ===
Moloney was selected as a finalist for the Mass. Technology Leadership Council CEO of the Year award in 2018 and 2019 and was named Chief Executive HR Champion by the College and University Professional Association for Human Resources in 2018.

In 2017, Moloney was recognized as one of seven prominent “Women Who Mean Business” by the Boston Business Journal. In 2021, she was number 19 on the Boston Globe's Top 100 Women-Led Businesses in Massachusetts. In May 2021, she received the "Make a Difference" award from Strongwater Farm.

== Publications ==
- Moloney, J. (1991). Changing beliefs about the under prepared student. In N. Wyner (Ed.), Current Perspectives on School Culture. Boston, MA: Brookline Books.
- Moloney, J. (1994). Elements and issues of planning a cross-disciplinary general education curriculum. Journal of General Education, 43(2), 73-89.
- Moloney, J., & Tello, S. (2003). Achieving quality and scale through transformative assessment: A case study. Elements of quality online education: Into the mainstream, volume 5 in the Sloan-C series.
- Moloney, J., & Tello, S. (2003). Principles for building success in online education. Syllabus, 16(7) 15-17.
- Moloney, J., Dion, S., Hickey, C., & Siccama, C. (2005). Transforming graduate students through service learning. Academic Leadership. 20(11).
- Moloney, J., & Oakley, B. (2006). Scaling online education: Increasing access into higher education. Journal of Asynchronous Learning Networks. 10(3).
- Tello, S., & Moloney, J. (2006). Linking assessment to institutional transformation. The Sloan-C View. 5(4).
- Moloney, J., Hickey, C., Bergin, A., Boccia, J., Polley, K., & Riley, J. (2007) Characteristics of successful local blended programs in the context of the Sloan-C pillars. Journal of Asynchronous Learning Networks. 11(1).
- Moloney, J., Turner, L., & Forman, D. (2014). University of Massachusetts case study, transformational change through clear leadership. In Gentle, P., & Forman, D., Engaging leaders: The challenge of inspiring collective commitment in universities. (pp. 37–41). New York, NY: Routledge.
