= Julie Chen (academic) =

4th Chancellor of UMass Lowell

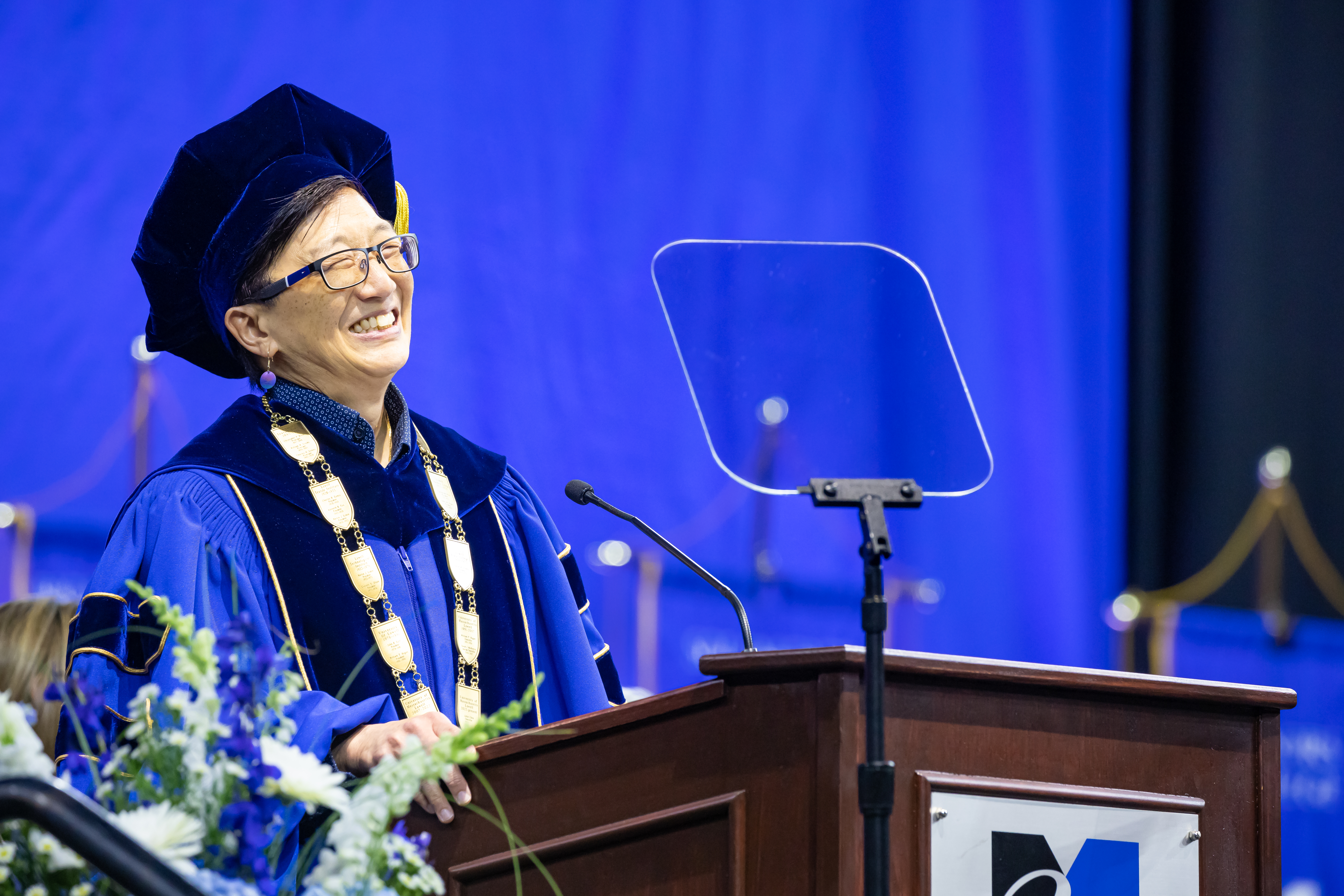
- Chen in the Tsongas Arena during her chancellor inauguration in 2023

4th Chancellor of the University of Massachusetts Lowell
- Incumbent
- Assumed office July 1, 2022
- President: Marty Meehan
- Preceded by: Jacqueline Moloney

Personal details
- Salary: US$495,000 in FY 2024
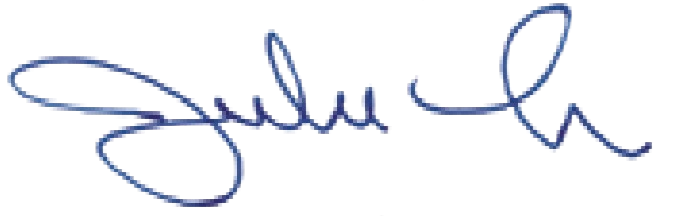
- Signature
- Scientific career
- Education: Massachusetts Institute of Technology (BS, MS, PhD)
- Fields: engineering
- Workplaces: Boston University; University of Massachusetts Lowell
- Thesis: The application of continuum mechanics to the stochastic modeling of fracture in fiber-fiber composites (1991)
- Doctoral advisor: Stanley Backer

Julie Chen is an American educator and chancellor of the University of Massachusetts Lowell. She is the university's fourth chancellor, the second woman, and first openly gay leader to fill the role. She's the first LGBTQ+ Chancellor in the UMass System. She is considered a New England expert in nanotechnology.

== Early life and education ==
Chen earned her bachelor's (1986), master's (1988) and doctoral (1991) degrees from the Massachusetts Institute of Technology.

== Career ==
Chen started her career in 1990 as an engineering professor at Boston University. In 1997, she joined the faculty at UMass Lowell. She previously served as Vice Chancellor for Research and Economic Development.

In addition to her work in academics, she spent 2002 to 2004 as the director for the Materials Processing and Manufacturing at the National Science Foundation. In 2010, she was the Technical Program Chair for the American Society of Mechanical Engineers' International Mechanical Engineering Congress and Exposition.

In 2019, she was awarded an honorary degree from Queens University Belfast. She is a recipient of the Public Service Commendation Medal.

Chen has been honored by the Lowell City Council for her work partnering with the city.
