= Eric Alva =

American Marine

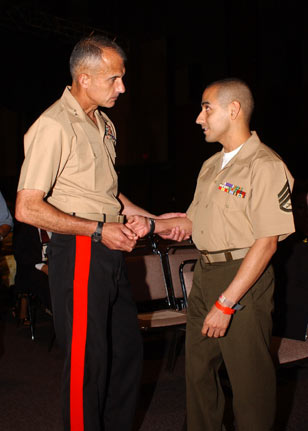
- Major General Christopher Cortez (left), commends Staff Sergeant Eric Alva on July 13, 2003, calling him "a credit to the Corps".
- Born: December 19, 1970 (age 55); San Antonio, Texas, United States
- Occupations: Author, Adjunct Professor at University of Texas at San Antonio, Inspirational Speaker, United States Marine, Activist
- Spouse: Danny Ingram

Staff Sergeant Eric Fidelis Alva (born December 19, 1970) is the first Marine seriously injured in the Iraq War. On March 21, 2003, he was in charge of 11 Marines in a supply unit when he stepped on a land mine and lost his right leg.

Alva, a native of San Antonio, Texas, grew up in a military family. He graduated from high school in 1989, weighing just 90 pounds. He joined the United States Marine Corps in 1990 at the age of 19 when he already knew he was gay and the U.S. military excluded all gays and lesbians from service, open or not. He served for 13 years, including postings in Okinawa and Somalia. For much of his career, he was out to his fellow Marines.

He began working as a spokesman for the Human Rights Campaign in 2006. In February 2007, he joined Democratic Rep. Marty Meehan of Massachusetts and a bipartisan group of House members when they reintroduced the Military Readiness Enhancement Act, legislation that would repeal the "don't ask, don't tell" (DADT) policy regarding service in the U.S. armed forces on the part of gays and lesbians.

Alva then served as the Grand Marshal of the 2008 Chicago Gay and Lesbian Pride parade on Sunday, June 29, 2008.

On July 23, 2008, Alva testified about DADT before a subcommittee of the House Armed Services Committee. He said: "Unit cohesion is essential. What my experience proves, they are wrong about how to achieve it. My being gay and even many of my colleagues knowing about it didn't damage unit cohesion. They put their lives in my hands, and when I was injured, they risked their lives to save mine." He described intimate living conditions while stationed in Somalia. He also reported conversations with military personnel from other countries in which they uniformly expressed surprise that "our Nation is so further behind others when we seem to be the forefront of trying to be the example."

In an interview with the Chicago Tribune, General Peter Pace said, "I believe homosexual acts between individuals are immoral." Alva commented: "His remarks were insensitive and disrespectful to the thousands of men and women who are serving in the military at this current time under the policy." In December 2010, Marine Corps commandant Gen. James F. Amos said the presence of homosexuals in the marines would pose a "distraction" and that "I don't want to have any Marines that I'm visiting at Bethesda [National Naval Medical Center] with no legs be the result of any type of distraction." Alva commented: "He pretty much spit on me, my Purple Heart, and my 13 years of service. I would definitely ask Amos for a meeting to explain his comments, and I'd bring my Purple Heart with me."

On October 11, 2021, Alva published his first book, Radical Courage: How One Marine's Sacrifice Helped Change America (with Candi S. Cross, You Talk I Write)
