= Manning School of Business =

Business school of the University of Massachusetts-Lowell

Coordinates: 42.653°N 71.326°W

Robert J. Manning School of Business
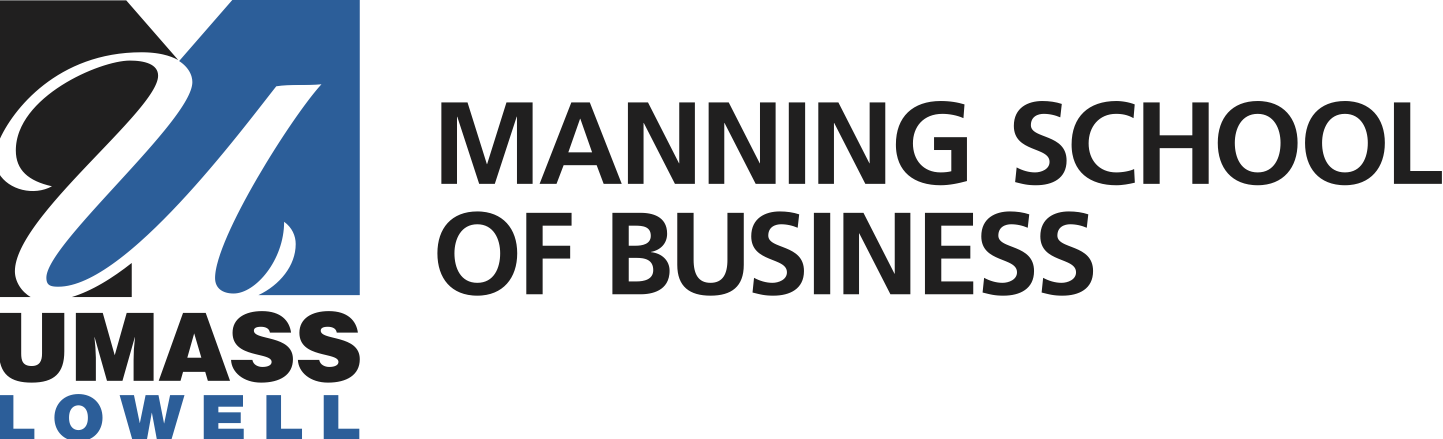
- Type: Public Business School
- Dean: Bertie Greer
- Academic staff: 70 full-time faculty
- Students: 4,039
- Undergraduates: 2,510
- Postgraduates: 1,529
- Location: Lowell, Massachusetts, U.S.
- Campus: Urban
- Colors: Blue and Black
- Website: www.uml.edu/manning

The Robert J. Manning School of Business is the business school at the University of Massachusetts Lowell located in Lowell, Massachusetts. The Manning School is accredited by AACSB International (AACSB).

The school offers eight undergraduate majors along with MBA, MS, Ph.D., and graduate certificate programs. As of fall 2019, the school had 2,510 undergraduate students, and 1,529 graduate students, with 77 full-time faculty members.

== History ==
Introduced as the Division of Business and Economics in 1959 at Lowell Technological Institute, the Manning School of Business was originally designed to offer business classes to engineering students in the Industrial Technology program. The College of Management Science was developed in 1971 and offered a range of degree programs in business administration. The college was renamed the Manning School of Business in 2011 and is named after Robert J. Manning, the chairman and CEO of MFS Investment Management. The school was named after Manning, a 1984 graduate of UMass Lowell, after he and his wife donated $5 million to the university.

The Manning School of Business is housed in the Pulichino Tong Business Center, which opened in April 2017. The building is named after alumnus John Pulichino '67 and his wife, Joy Tong, who committed more than $4 million in scholarship funds for Manning School students. The Pulichino Tong Business Center has over 54,000 square feet of classroom, office, and conference space. The facility features a four-story atrium, technology enhanced classrooms, seminar rooms, faculty offices, a finance laboratory simulating a trading room floor, meeting spaces and collaborative study areas.

== Rankings ==
U.S. News & World Report ranked the Manning School 30th in the nation for Best Online Graduate Programs (excluding MBA) in 2018. At the MBA level, the Manning online MBA is ranked 29th in the nation by Poets & Quants and 51st in the nation by US News. The MBA program is also ranked as Tier One by CEO Magazine in their 2018 Global MBA rankings. The school's undergraduate program is nationally ranked in the top 200 by U.S. News. Princeton Review lists the Manning School of Business as one of their best 296 business schools. Fortune ranked the online MBA 9th in the Best Online MBA Programs in 2023.

== Academics ==
=== Undergraduate programs ===
- BS in Business Administration
  - Accounting
  - Analytics and Operations Management
  - Entrepreneurship
  - Finance
  - International Business
  - Management
  - Management Information Systems
  - Marketing

=== Graduate programs ===
- MBA
- MS in Accounting
- MS in Business Analytics
- MS in Entrepreneurship and Innovation
- MS in Finance
- Foundations of Business graduate certificate
- Business Analytics graduate certificate
- Financial Management graduate certificate
- New Venture Creation graduate certificate

=== Doctorate programs ===
- Ph.D. with concentrations in:
  - Accounting
  - Decision Sciences
  - Entrepreneurship
  - Finance
  - Leadership/Organization Studies
  - Management Information Systems
  - Marketing

== Graduation Rates ==
The Graduation Rates for freshman in the Fall semester of 2011 from The Manning School of Business was 33% for a 4-year Graduation Rate and for a 6-year Graduation Rate for the same semester was 54.5%.

== Research ==
The Manning School of Business hosts the following research centers:

- The Donahue Center for Business Ethics and Social Responsibility
- The Jack M. Wilson Center for Entrepreneurship
- Behavioral Lab and Participant System

== Organizations ==
The Manning School of Business 13 Student Leadership Organizations:

- Accounting Society
- Beta Gamma Sigma
- Business Analytics Society
- College DECA
- Entrepreneurial Ventures Association
- Finance Society
- International Business Society
- Joy Tong Women in Business
- Management Society
- Manning Consulting Group
- Marketing Society
- Real Estate Network Association
- Salesforce Leaders Group
