= Kennedy College of Sciences =

College at the University of Massachusetts Lowell

The William J. and John F. Kennedy College of Sciences at the University of Massachusetts Lowell is so named for the Kennedy family (unrelated to the political family) and their contributions to the campus. John F. Kennedy is an alumnus of the Lowell Technological Institute Class of 1970. The Lowell Technological Institute merged with the Lowell State College to become the University of Lowell in 1972. It joined the UMass system in 1991 to become UMass Lowell.

The William J. and John F. Kennedy College of Sciences at the University of Massachusetts Lowell comprises six departments: Biological Sciences; Chemistry; the Richard A. Miner School of Computer & Information Sciences; Environmental, Earth and Atmospheric Sciences; Mathematics & Statistics; and Physics & Applied Physics. The Dean of the Kennedy College of Sciences is Noureddine Melikechi, D.Phil.

== History of the College ==
College of Pure & Applied Science: (date of creation unknown, possibly when Lowell Technological Institute was created in 1955)

College of Arts & Sciences: 1992 to 1996

- The College of Arts & Sciences was created when the College of Pure & Applied Science and the College of Liberal Arts were merged.

College of Arts & Sciences – Division of Sciences: 1996 to 2010

College of Arts & Sciences – Division of Fine Arts, Humanities and Social Sciences: 1996-2010

- The College of Arts & Sciences was split into two Divisions within the College with Deans for each Division (Sciences: Robert Tamarin; FAHSS: Nancy Kleniewski). The College of Fine Arts was merged into the Division of Humanities and Social Sciences to form the Division of Fine Arts, Humanities and Social Sciences (maybe 1997.)

College of Sciences: 2010 to 2015

- The College of Arts & Sciences – Division of Sciences and the College of Arts & Sciences – Division of Fine Arts, Humanities and Social Sciences officially split in 2010 to form individual Colleges (the College of Sciences and the College of Fine Arts, Humanities and Social Sciences).

William J. and John F. Kennedy College of Sciences: 2015 to Present

- The College of Sciences was renamed in 2015 to be known as the William J. and John F. Kennedy College of Sciences. William J. Kennedy ’54 is the late older brother of John F. Kennedy ‘70. Both are alumni of UMass Lowell’s predecessor college, Lowell Technological Institute.

=== History of the Deans ===
1978-1984	Joseph Salamone
1984–1985	Nicholas Renricca
1984–1985, 1990-1992	Arthur Watterson
1992-1995	Hamid Shirvani
1995-1996	Kenneth Levasseur (Interim Dean)
1996-2012	Robert Tamarin
2012-2016	Mark Hines (Acting Dean)
2016–Present	Noureddine Melikechi

== Departments ==
=== Biological Sciences ===
The Department of Biological Sciences undergraduate degree programs are Biology, Bioinformatics, Biotechnology, Ecology, Evolution and Organismal Biology and Pre-Medical/Pre-Health as well as the option to minor in biological sciences. The department also offers graduate degree programs including Biology, Bioinformatics, Biotechnology, Education, Communication and Outreach, and a Ph.D. in Applied Biology of Biomedical Engineering & Biotechnology. Dr. Peter Gaines is the chair of the department. The department has more than 30 professors and lecturers.

=== Chemistry ===
The Department of Chemistry trains students to be technical chemists as well as allowing them to explore research pathways. The department offers bachelors, masters, and doctorate degrees. Chemistry students pursuing a bachelor's degree have the option to focus in Forensic Science, Biochemistry, and General Chemistry. General Chemistry, Environmental Chemistry, Biochemistry, and Polymer Science are different specializations of graduate degrees.

Dr. David Ryan is the chair of the department and specializes in Analytical and Environmental Chemistry. The Chemistry Department has 20+ faculty as well as 150 undergraduate students and 100 graduate students.

=== Richard A. Miner School of Computer and Information Sciences ===
The Department of Computer Science was named the Richard A. Miner School of Computer and Information Sciences in the Fall of 2022, after UMass Lowell's Department of Computer Science alumnus Richard A. Miner ('86, '89, '97), co-founder of Android. The school offers bachelors, masters, and doctorate degree programs and is also home to a Robotics minor program. General Computer Science, Cybersecurity, Data Science, and Bio-Cheminformatics are different concentrations the department provides. The school also offers, in conjunction with the Division of Graduate, Online & Professional Studies, the Computer Science Certificate. Prior knowledge of programing is not required in this major.

The chair of the department is Dr. Holly Yanco, who focuses on robotics, assistive technology & artificial intelligence.

=== Environmental, Earth and Atmospheric Sciences ===
The Department of Environmental, Earth and Atmospheric Sciences (EEAS for short) focuses on earth sciences such as Meteorology, Environmental Studies and Geology. The department chair is Dr. Jeffrey Basara. Dr. Basara focuses on the complex, integrated processes across weather, climate, water, and ecosystems with specific attention directed toward hydrometeorological and hydroclimatological extremes and associated impacts.

=== Mathematics & Statistics ===
Dr. Ravi Montenegro is the chair of the department. His research focuses on the convergence rate of Markov chains, birthday attacks, and combinatorics. The Department of Mathematics and Statistics is also home to Prof. Jim Propp. Professor Propp has been a member of the UML Department of Mathematical Sciences since 2006. He was also one of the national winners of the United States of America Mathematical Olympiad (USAMO). Students in the Department of Mathematics and Statistics can get a B.A. in mathematics, a B.S. in mathematics, or become graduates. Some of the concentrations in the B.S. program include Applied Computational Math, Computer Science, Business Applications, Bioinformatics, Teaching, and Probability/Statistics. A doctorate program in Computational Mathematics is provided, which is also a part of the Computer Science department.

=== Physics and Applied Physics ===
The Physics Department has bachelor's, master's, and doctorate degree pathways. The degree concentrations provided are General Physics, Astronomy, Photonics, and Radiological Health Sciences. In 2016 a professor from the department and the Dean launched a satellite to Mars with NASA. UMass Lowell's research nuclear reactor has done work with NASA, the army and many private high tech companies. The chair of the Department is Dr. Arthur Mittler, who specializes in nuclear physics, and physics education.

== Research centers and specialized laboratories ==
Kennedy College of Sciences provides various laboratory opportunities for students to explore throughout their academic. Research can be found in the different departments including, but not limited to:

Biology

- Biodiversity
- Developmental biology
- Ecology & evolution
- Craniofacial and limb development
- Nervous system
- Physiology & biomechanics

Chemistry

- Antibiofilm Materials & Dynamic
- Nanoscience Research
- Single-molecule Bio-molecular Electronics

Physics

- Astronomy & Astrophysics
- Biophotonics
- Medical Physics
- Theoretical Cosmology

Environmental, Earth & atmospheric research

- Weather and climate variability
- Geochemistry
- Environmental Evolution
- Marine environments

The New England Robotics Validation and Experimentation Center provides a research, testing and training facility to academic researchers and corporations who work with robotics. Some partnerships include iRobot, Google, and NASA.

The Space Science Lab conducts experimental and analytical research to provide scholars and companies with information regarding the atmosphere and space sciences.

The UML Submillimeter Wave Technology Lab uses terahertz radar technology to create 3D scattering and imaging solutions to sponsors.
