= Lowell Center for Space Science & Technology =

Public research center in Lowell, Massachusetts, U.S.

- Parent institution: University of Massachusetts, Lowell
- President: Space science and technology
- Director: Supriya Chakrabarti
- Faculty: 9
- Address: Wannalancit Mills, Suite 315 600 Suffolk Street
- Location: Lowell
- Website: Lowell Center for Space Science & Technology

Lowell Center for Space Science & Technology (abbreviated as LoCSST) is a public research centre in Lowell, Massachusetts, affiliated by University of Massachusetts Lowell. The research centre has partners and grants from research giants like NASA, National Science Federation, BoldlyGo institute for its excellence in Space science research.

== Faculty ==
- Supriya Chakrabarti, Ph.D., Professor of UMass Lowell and Director of the institute, faculty on Physics and applied physics.
- Dimitris Christodoulou, Assistant Teaching Professor, faculty on Mathematical Science
- Ofer Cohen, excels in the field of Computational plasma physics, Computational methods, Magnetohydrodynamics
- Timothy Cook, Associate Professor in Physics; works on Visible & ultraviolet instrumentation, Sounding rockets, Small satellites, Tomography & other novel data analysis techniques
- Christopher Hansen, Chair, UMass Lowell SHAP3D Site Director, Associate Professor of Mechanical Engineering; works on Materials science, self-healing materials, additive manufacturing (i.e. 3D printing) techniques
- Silas Laycock, Associate Professor in Physics; works on Neutron stars and black holes in X-ray binaries, pulsars, multi wavelength astronomy, time domain astrophysics.
- Marianna Maiaru, Assistant Professor of Mechanical Engineering
- Ramaswamy Nagarajan, Co-Director of HEROES; works on Biocatalysis, greener advanced materials (electronic, photo-responsive polymers, molecularly integrated hybrid nanomaterials, materials for energy conversion/storage), elastomers, thermal & morphological characterization of materials, roll to roll manufacture of flexible electronic products
- Jay Weitzen, Professor of Electrical & Computer Engineering and Wireless Communication

== Research ==
The institute has or had worked on numerous topics or projects.

- Experimental astronomy and space physics.
- Observational Astronomy
- Research on X-ray Binary Pulsars, based
- Black Hole High mass X-ray Binary
- Computational Astrophysics and Space Physics

=== Projects ===
- PICTURE C

PICTURE C stands for Planetary Imaging Concept Testbed Using a Recoverable Experiment – Coronagraph. NASA awarded Chakrabarti's team a $5.6 million grant to develop and test PICTURE C. It was the largest grant up to then. The system potentially can detect young, Jupiter-size planets orbiting other sun-like stars in the Milky Way, capable of supporting life, by studying the disk of dust, asteroids, planets and other debris orbiting the stars and gain a better understanding of the processes and dynamics that formed solar system. PICTURE C is carried aloft to the edge of Earth's atmosphere, using huge helium balloons. Under Dr. Chakrabarti, PICTURE C made its first test flight in September 2019. The 'balloon lofted camera' instrument inflates to 400 feet (120 meters) across and takes 3 hours to climb to an altitude of about 127,000 feet (39 kilometers) and then hovers. The success of PICTURE-C test launch, makes space-based direct imaging a reality and helps NASA's Wide Field Infrared Survey Telescope (WFIRST) with such technological support. Members associated with the project are Supriya Chakraborti, Timothy Cook, Kuravi Hewawasam, Susanna Finn and Christopher Mendillo. Other collaborations were made from NASA's Jet Propulsion Laboratory, Goddard Space Flight Center, Caltech, MIT, the Space Telescope Science Institute and the University of California Santa Barbara.

- Project Blue

Project Blue aims to design, build and launch a small and lightweight space telescope to detect habitable planets around the nearest star Alpha Centauri. LCSST team develops instrumentation for direct imaging of exoplanets in this project. The project is also associated with The BoldlyGo Institute, SETI Institute and Mission Centaur.

- SPACE HAUC project

The Science Program Around Communication Engineering with High Achieving Undergraduate Cadres Project or SPACE HAUC project provides multi-disciplinary undergraduate students with hands-on training in designing and building space-flight missions. NASA released the Undergraduate Student Instrument Project (USIP) and Student Flight Research Opportunity (SFRO) in August 2015 and LCSST sent a proposal that was accepted under the program. The project was selected in 2017 by NASA's CubeSat Launch Initiative (CSLI) to be launched as part of the ELaNa program. Dr. Chakrabarti mentors more than 75 undergraduate students from the Kennedy College of Sciences and the Francis College of Engineering for the project. The team's goal is to design and build a small cube satellite that will be launched by NASA into the orbit. NASA has awarded the team $200,000 to develop and test a prototype satellite, called SPACE HAUC-1, which is the UMass Lowell's first mission to go around the Earth. The program is designed to demonstrate the practicality of communicating at high data rates in the X band. SPACE HAUC was expected to launch in 2018, later postponed to 2020. The satellite has successfully passed design review and is under the testing phase. After final assembly and integration of the spacecraft, SPACE HAUC is expected launch to the ISS for further deployment.

- PICTURE B
- IMAGERII

== Facilities ==
- The library contains source specific event files (gti and barycenter corrected), source images, light curves (in three different energy bands titled soft, broad and hard), spectra, periodograms, and pulse profiles on different projects. It also contains data of six X-ray telescope missions (~2000 pointed observations) namely, XMM-Newton, RXTE, Chandra, NuSTAR, NICER and Suzaku, spanning across a period of two decades up until 2019.
- An Astronomical Observatory is located on South Campus named UMass Lowell Schueller Observatory.
