= Don't Ask, Don't Tell Repeal Act of 2010 =

US federal law ending military LGBTQ policy

- Long title: A bill to provide for the repeal of the Department of Defense policy concerning homosexuality in the Armed Forces known as "Don't Ask, Don't Tell".
- Nicknames: DADT Repeal
- Enacted by: the 111th United States Congress
- Effective: September 20, 2011

Citations
- Public law: 111–321
- Statutes at Large: 124 Stat. 3515, 3516 and 3517

Legislative history
- Introduced in the House as H.R. 2965 by Jason Altmire (D-PA) on December 14, 2010; Committee consideration by Committee on Science and Technology (Subcommittee on Technology and Innovation) Committee on Small Business; Passed the House on December 15, 2010 (250–175); Passed the Senate on December 18, 2010 (65–31); Signed into law by President Barack Obama on December 22, 2010

The Don't Ask, Don't Tell Repeal Act of 2010 (H.R. 2965, S. 4023) is a landmark United States federal statute enacted in December 2010 that established a process for ending the "don't ask, don't tell" (DADT) policy (10 U.S.C. § 654), thus allowing gay, lesbian, and bisexual people to serve openly in the United States Armed Forces. It ended the policy in place since 1993 that allowed them to serve only if they kept their sexual orientation secret and the military did not learn of their sexual orientation, which was controversial.

The Act established a process for ending the "don't ask, don't tell" policy. The Act did not ban discrimination on the basis of sexual orientation in the military, as provided for in the proposed Military Readiness Enhancement Act.

President Barack Obama, Defense Secretary Leon Panetta, and Chairman of the Joint Chiefs of Staff Admiral Mike Mullen provided the certification required by the Act to Congress on July 22, 2011. Implementation of repeal was completed 60 days later, so that DADT was no longer policy as of September 20, 2011.

== Provisions ==
According to the Congressional Research Service, the Act:

Provided for repeal of the current Department of Defense (DOD) policy concerning homosexuality in the Armed Forces, to be effective 60 days after the Secretary of Defense has received DOD's comprehensive review on the implementation of such repeal, and the President, Secretary, and Chairman of the Joint Chiefs of Staff (JCS) certify to the congressional defense committees that they have considered the report and proposed plan of action, that DOD has prepared the necessary policies and regulations to exercise the discretion provided by such repeal, and that implementation of such policies and regulations is consistent with the standards of military readiness and effectiveness, unit cohesion, and military recruiting and retention.

== Background ==
DADT was controversial from the time it was implemented, but it became increasingly a matter of public debate after 2004. In July 2004, the American Psychological Association issued a statement that "Empirical evidence fails to show that sexual orientation is germane to any aspect of military effectiveness including unit cohesion, morale, recruitment and retention." In February 2005, the Government Accountability Office reported that DADT cost at least $95.4 million for recruiting and at least $95.1 million for training replacements for the 9,488 troops discharged from 1994 through 2003. In December 2006, Zogby International reported that a poll of military personnel conducted in October 2006 found that 26% favored allowing gays and lesbians to serve openly in the military, 37% were opposed, while 37% expressed no preference or were unsure. In 2008, former U.S. Senator Sam Nunn, who had previously blocked plans to lift the ban on gays openly serving the military, showed a shift from his previous political views by endorsing a new Pentagon study to examine the issue of homosexuals serving openly in the military. At a February 2, 2010 congressional hearing, Senator John McCain (Note: McCain ran against Obama in the 2008 United States presidential election.) read from a letter signed by "over one thousand former general and flag officers". It said: "We firmly believe that this law, which Congress passed to protect good order, discipline and morale in the unique environment of the armed forces, deserves continued support."

== Legislative history ==
The Democratic leadership in both the House and Senate tried to end the "don't ask, don't tell" policy with an amendment to the Defense Authorization bill. On May 27, 2010, on a 234–194 vote, the U.S. House of Representatives approved the Murphy amendment to the National Defense Authorization Act for Fiscal Year 2011. It provided for repeal of the DADT policy and created a process for lifting the policy, including a U.S. Department of Defense study and certification by key officials that the change in policy would not harm military effectiveness, followed by a waiting period of 60 days. On the same day the U.S. Senate Armed Services Committee on a 16–12 vote advanced an identical measure to be included in the Defense Authorization Act. The amended defense bill passed the House on May 28, 2010. On September 21, 2010, John McCain led a successful (56 in favor, 43 opposed) filibuster against the debate on the Defense Authorization Act.

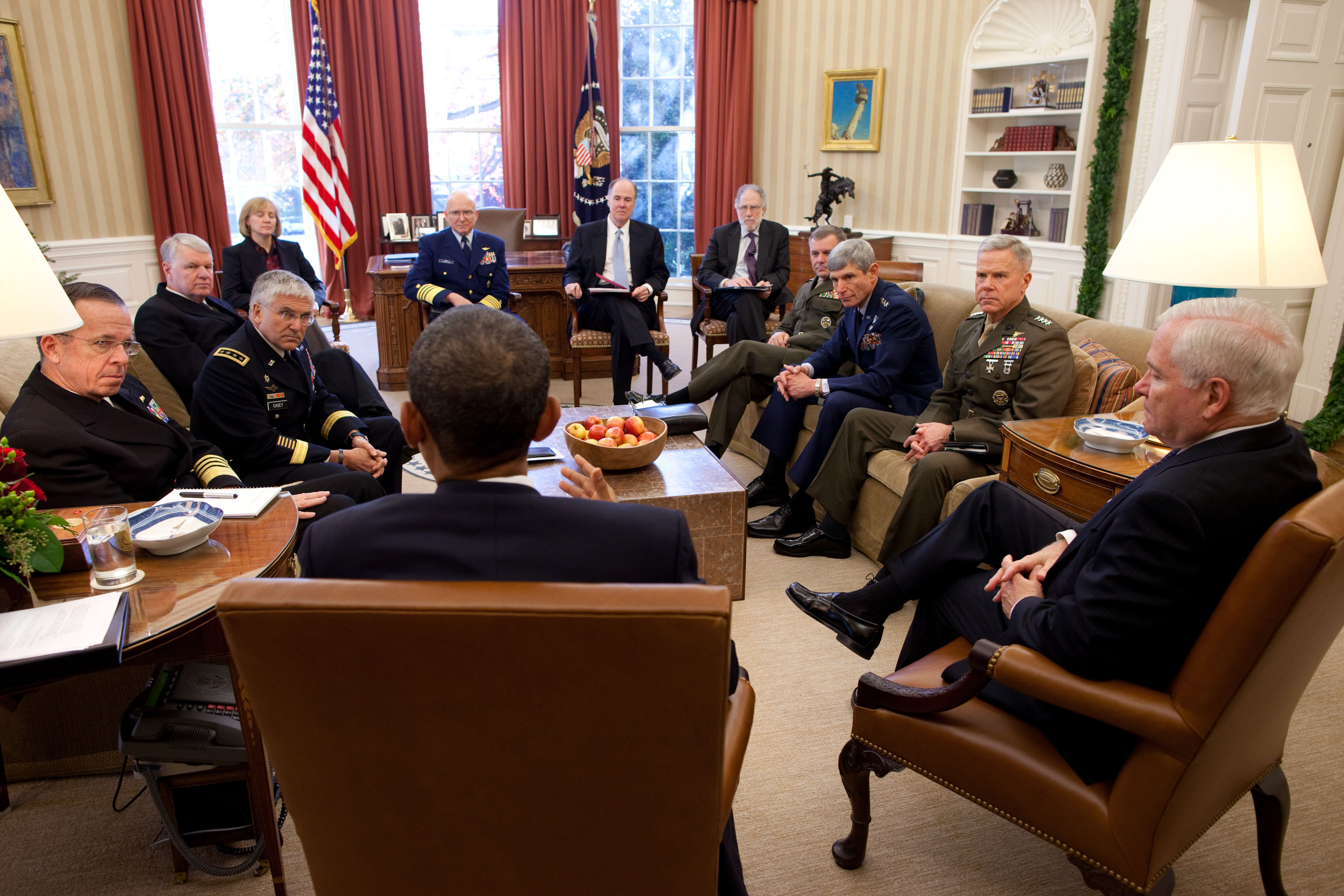
Obama meeting with the Joint Chiefs of Staff on the eve of publication of a Defense Department report on repeal of DADT

On November 30, 2010, the Department of Defense's Comprehensive Review Working Group (CRWG) on DADT repeal issued its formal report outlining a path to the implementation of repeal of DADT. The report indicated that there was low risk of service disruptions because of repeal of the ban. Gates encouraged Congress to act quickly to repeal the law so that the military could carefully adjust rather than face a court decision requiring it to lift the policy immediately. The United States Senate held two days of hearings on December 2 and 3, 2010, to consider the CRWG report. Defense Secretary Robert Gates, Joint Chiefs Chairman Michael Mullen urged immediate repeal. The heads of the Marine Corps, Army, and Navy all advised against immediate repeal and expressed varied views on its eventual repeal.

Democrats in Congress quickly scheduled hearings to consider repeal of the law. On December 3, the Joint Chiefs of Staff appeared before the Senate Armed Services Committee to testify about repeal. While the Vice Chairman of the Joint Chiefs of Staff, Chief of Naval Operations, and Commandant of the Coast Guard said repeal would cause minimal disruption, heads of the Army, Air Force, and Marines opposed repeal because it would cause additional stress on combat focused forces during war.

On December 9, 2010, another filibuster prevented debate on the Defense Authorization Act during the lame duck session of Congress.

On December 9, 2010, in reaction to the failure to open discussion on the Defense Authorization Act, Senators Joe Lieberman and Susan Collins introduced a bill that included the policy-related portions of the Defense Authorization Act that they considered more likely to pass as a stand-alone bill. The Washington Post compared it to a Hail Mary pass. The stand-alone bill was sponsored by Patrick Murphy and passed the House on a vote of 250 to 175 on December 15, 2010.

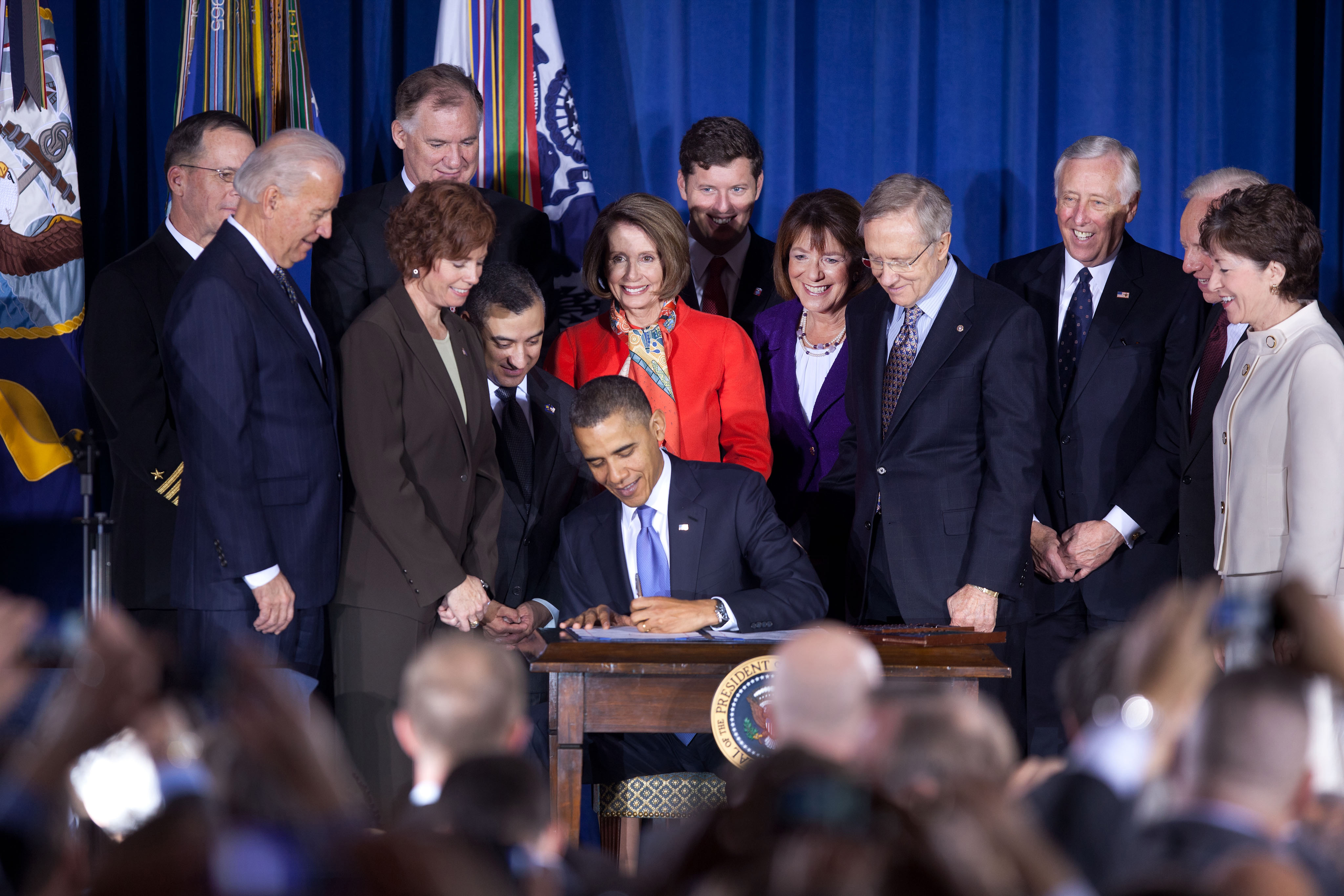
Obama signs the Don't Ask, Don't Tell Repeal Act of 2010.

On December 18, 2010, the Senate voted to end debate on its version of the bill by a cloture vote of 63–33. Prior to the vote, Sen. Lieberman gave the final argument in favor of repealing DADT and Sen. McCain argued against repeal. The final Senate vote was held later that same day, with the measure passing by a vote of 65–31.

U.S. Secretary of Defense Robert Gates released a statement following the vote indicating that the planning for implementation of a policy repeal would begin right away, led by Under Secretary of Defense for Personnel and Readiness Clifford L. Stanley, and would continue until Gates certified that conditions were met for orderly repeal of the policy. President Barack Obama signed the bill into law on December 22, 2010.

=== Senate roll call ===
Senate vote by state Both yes One yes, one didn't vote One yes, one no One no, one didn't vote Both no

State	Senator	Party	Vote on Cloture	Vote on Repeal
Hawaii	Daniel Akaka	Democratic	✓ Aye	✓ Aye
Tennessee	Lamar Alexander	Republican	✗ No	✗ No
Wyoming	John Barrasso	Republican	✗ No	✗ No
Montana	Max Baucus	Democratic	✓ Aye	✓ Aye
Indiana	Evan Bayh	Democratic	✓ Aye	✓ Aye
Alaska	Mark Begich	Democratic	✓ Aye	✓ Aye
Colorado	Michael Bennet	Democratic	✓ Aye	✓ Aye
Utah	Robert Bennett	Republican	✗ No	✗ No
New Mexico	Jeff Bingaman	Democratic	✓ Aye	✓ Aye
Missouri	Kit Bond	Republican	✗ No	✗ No
California	Barbara Boxer	Democratic	✓ Aye	✓ Aye
Ohio	Sherrod Brown	Democratic	✓ Aye	✓ Aye
Massachusetts	Scott Brown	Republican	✓ Aye	✓ Aye
Kansas	Sam Brownback	Republican	✗ No	✗ No
Kentucky	Jim Bunning	Republican	Did not vote	Did not vote
North Carolina	Richard Burr	Republican	✗ No	✓ Aye
Washington	Maria Cantwell	Democratic	✓ Aye	✓ Aye
Maryland	Ben Cardin	Democratic	✓ Aye	✓ Aye
Delaware	Tom Carper	Democratic	✓ Aye	✓ Aye
Pennsylvania	Bob Casey, Jr.	Democratic	✓ Aye	✓ Aye
Georgia	Saxby Chambliss	Republican	✗ No	✗ No
Oklahoma	Tom Coburn	Republican	✗ No	✗ No
Mississippi	Thad Cochran	Republican	✗ No	✗ No
Maine	Susan Collins	Republican	✓ Aye	✓ Aye
North Dakota	Kent Conrad	Democratic	✓ Aye	✓ Aye
Delaware	Chris Coons	Democratic	✓ Aye	✓ Aye
Tennessee	Bob Corker	Republican	✗ No	✗ No
Texas	John Cornyn	Republican	✗ No	✗ No
Idaho	Mike Crapo	Republican	✗ No	✗ No
South Carolina	Jim DeMint	Republican	✗ No	✗ No
Connecticut	Chris Dodd	Democratic	✓ Aye	✓ Aye
North Dakota	Byron Dorgan	Democratic	✓ Aye	✓ Aye
Illinois	Dick Durbin	Democratic	✓ Aye	✓ Aye
Nevada	John Ensign	Republican	✗ No	✓ Aye
Wyoming	Mike Enzi	Republican	✗ No	✗ No
Wisconsin	Russ Feingold	Democratic	✓ Aye	✓ Aye
California	Dianne Feinstein	Democratic	✓ Aye	✓ Aye
Minnesota	Al Franken	Democratic	✓ Aye	✓ Aye
New York	Kirsten Gillibrand	Democratic	✓ Aye	✓ Aye
South Carolina	Lindsey Graham	Republican	✗ No	✗ No
Iowa	Chuck Grassley	Republican	✗ No	✗ No
New Hampshire	Judd Gregg	Republican	Did not vote	Did not vote
North Carolina	Kay Hagan	Democratic	✓ Aye	✓ Aye
Iowa	Tom Harkin	Democratic	✓ Aye	✓ Aye
Utah	Orrin Hatch	Republican	Did not vote	Did not vote
Texas	Kay Bailey Hutchison	Republican	✗ No	✗ No
Oklahoma	Jim Inhofe	Republican	✗ No	✗ No
Hawaii	Daniel Inouye	Democratic	✓ Aye	✓ Aye
Georgia	Johnny Isakson	Republican	✗ No	✗ No
Nebraska	Mike Johanns	Republican	✗ No	✗ No
South Dakota	Tim Johnson	Democratic	✓ Aye	✓ Aye
Massachusetts	John Kerry	Democratic	✓ Aye	✓ Aye
Illinois	Mark Kirk	Republican	✓ Aye	✓ Aye
Minnesota	Amy Klobuchar	Democratic	✓ Aye	✓ Aye
Wisconsin	Herb Kohl	Democratic	✓ Aye	✓ Aye
Arizona	Jon Kyl	Republican	✗ No	✗ No
Louisiana	Mary Landrieu	Democratic	✓ Aye	✓ Aye
New Jersey	Frank Lautenberg	Democratic	✓ Aye	✓ Aye
Vermont	Patrick Leahy	Democratic	✓ Aye	✓ Aye
Florida	George LeMieux	Republican	✗ No	✗ No
Michigan	Carl Levin	Democratic	✓ Aye	✓ Aye
Connecticut	Joe Lieberman	Independent	✓ Aye	✓ Aye
Arkansas	Blanche Lincoln	Democratic	✓ Aye	✓ Aye
Indiana	Richard Lugar	Republican	✗ No	✗ No
West Virginia	Joe Manchin	Democratic	✗ No	Did not vote
Arizona	John McCain	Republican	✗ No	✗ No
Missouri	Claire McCaskill	Democratic	✓ Aye	✓ Aye
Kentucky	Mitch McConnell	Republican	✗ No	✗ No
New Jersey	Bob Menendez	Democratic	✓ Aye	✓ Aye
Oregon	Jeff Merkley	Democratic	✓ Aye	✓ Aye
Maryland	Barbara Mikulski	Democratic	✓ Aye	✓ Aye
Alaska	Lisa Murkowski	Republican	✓ Aye	✓ Aye
Washington	Patty Murray	Democratic	✓ Aye	✓ Aye
Nebraska	Ben Nelson	Democratic	✓ Aye	✓ Aye
Florida	Bill Nelson	Democratic	✓ Aye	✓ Aye
Arkansas	Mark Pryor	Democratic	✓ Aye	✓ Aye
Rhode Island	Jack Reed	Democratic	✓ Aye	✓ Aye
Nevada	Harry Reid	Democratic	✓ Aye	✓ Aye
Idaho	Jim Risch	Republican	✗ No	✗ No
Kansas	Pat Roberts	Republican	✗ No	✗ No
West Virginia	Jay Rockefeller	Democratic	✓ Aye	✓ Aye
Vermont	Bernie Sanders	Independent	✓ Aye	✓ Aye
New York	Chuck Schumer	Democratic	✓ Aye	✓ Aye
Alabama	Jeff Sessions	Republican	✗ No	✗ No
New Hampshire	Jeanne Shaheen	Democratic	✓ Aye	✓ Aye
Alabama	Richard Shelby	Republican	✗ No	✗ No
Maine	Olympia Snowe	Republican	✓ Aye	✓ Aye
Pennsylvania	Arlen Specter	Democratic	✓ Aye	✓ Aye
Michigan	Debbie Stabenow	Democratic	✓ Aye	✓ Aye
Montana	Jon Tester	Democratic	✓ Aye	✓ Aye
South Dakota	John Thune	Republican	✗ No	✗ No
Colorado	Mark Udall	Democratic	✓ Aye	✓ Aye
New Mexico	Tom Udall	Democratic	✓ Aye	✓ Aye
Louisiana	David Vitter	Republican	✗ No	✗ No
Ohio	George Voinovich	Republican	✓ Aye	✓ Aye
Virginia	Mark Warner	Democratic	✓ Aye	✓ Aye
Virginia	Jim Webb	Democratic	✓ Aye	✓ Aye
Rhode Island	Sheldon Whitehouse	Democratic	✓ Yes	✓ Aye
Mississippi	Roger Wicker	Republican	✗ No	✗ No
Oregon	Ron Wyden	Democratic	✓ Yes	✓ Yes

== Implementation ==
Following enactment, the Department of Defense charged a committee led by Clifford Stanley to oversee its implementation. Stanley's committee commissioned a comprehensive review of current policies, the repeal, and whether the new status quo would be consistent with the goals of, in the words of Secretary of Defense Robert Gates, "military readiness, military effectiveness, unit cohesion, and recruiting and retention of the Armed Forces."

On January 29, 2011, the Pentagon released its plan for implementing the end of DADT. It called for a three-month period of training for all personnel, beginning in the third quarter of 2011. President Obama, Defense Secretary Leon Panetta, and Joint Chiefs of Staff Chairman Adm. Mike Mullen sent Congress the required certification that implementation of repeal would not have negative effect on military readiness and performance on July 22, 2011. Full implementation of the repeal occurred 60 days later on September 20, 2011.

=== Removal of legal discrimination ===
The repeal of DADT did not alter the language of Article 125 of the Uniform Code of Military Justice, which banned sodomy by service members. This prohibition was removed upon enactment of the National Defense Authorization Act for Fiscal Year 2014.

The repeal of DADT also did not alter the status of same-sex-married service members, which was still unrecognized under the 1996 Defense of Marriage Act. On 14 August 2013, the Department of Defense (DoD) announced that it would provide spousal and family benefits to servicemembers in same-sex marriages on the same terms as it does to those in different-sex marriages; this was made retroactive to 26 June, when the Supreme Court decided in United States v. Windsor that Section 3 of DOMA, which barred U.S. military from extending those benefits to same-sex couples, was unconstitutional. From 13 September 2013, VA loans were extended to veterans in same-sex marriages. These decisions were affirmed in the 2015 ruling in Obergefell v. Hodges and the 2022 enactment of the Respect for Marriage Act.
