= Marty Meehan =

American politician (born 1956)

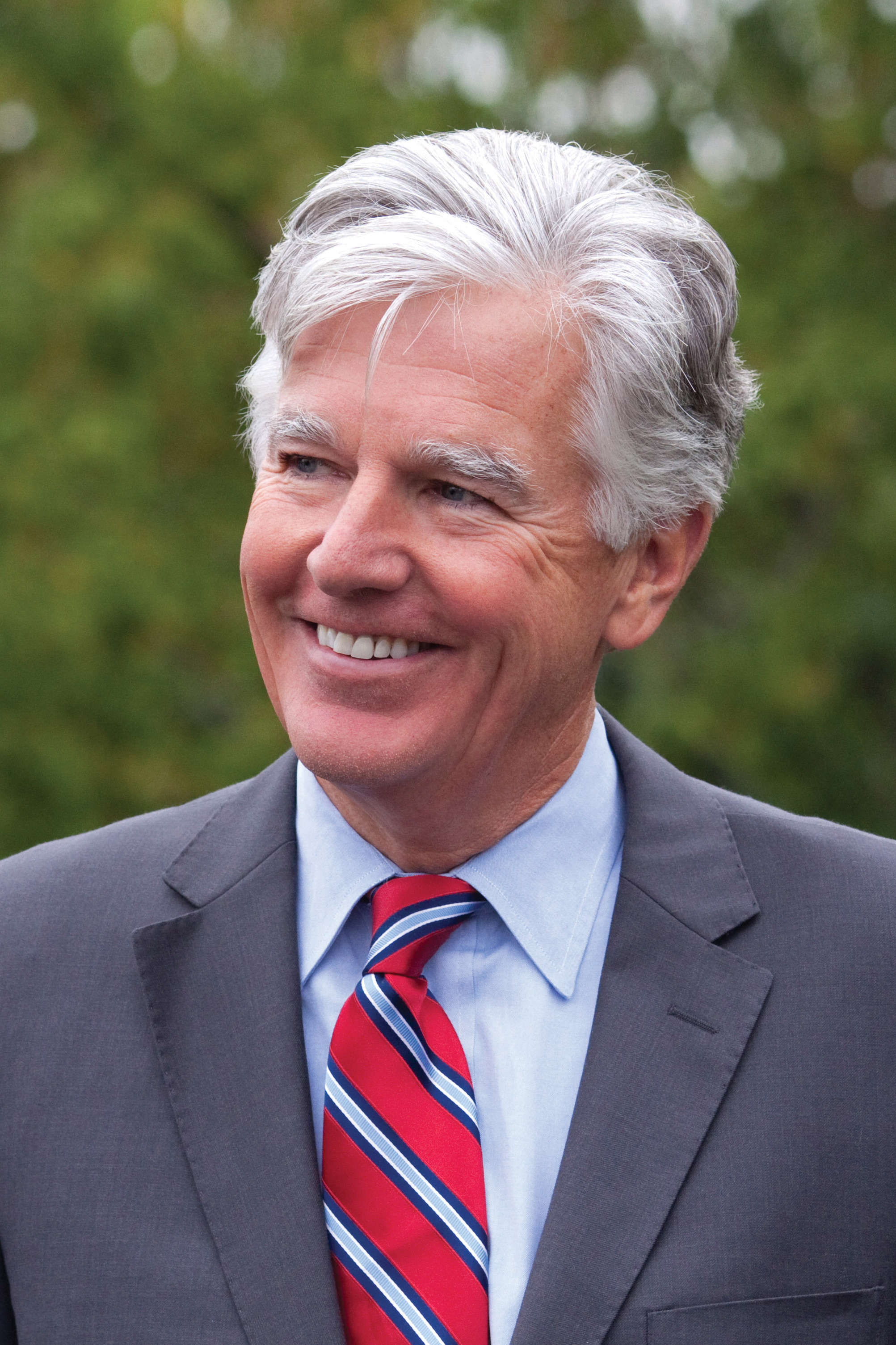
- Meehan in 2015

27th President of the University of Massachusetts System
- Incumbent
- Assumed office July 1, 2015
- Preceded by: Robert Caret

2nd Chancellor of the University of Massachusetts, Lowell
- In office July 1, 2007 – June 30, 2015
- Preceded by: William T. Hogan
- Succeeded by: Jacqueline Moloney

Member of the U.S. House of Representatives from Massachusetts's 5th district
- In office January 3, 1993 – July 1, 2007
- Preceded by: Chester Atkins
- Succeeded by: Niki Tsongas

Personal details
- Born: Martin Thomas Meehan; December 30, 1956 (age 69) Lowell, Massachusetts, U.S.
- Party: Democratic
- Spouses: Ellen Murphy (m. 1996; div. 2016); Jennifer Maguire (m. 2022)
- Children: 2
- Education: University of Massachusetts, Lowell (BS); Suffolk University (MPA, JD)

Martin Thomas Meehan (born December 30, 1956) is an American academic administrator, politician, and attorney. Since July 2015, Meehan has served as the president of the University of Massachusetts after serving as chancellor of the University of Massachusetts Lowell since September 2007.

Meehan, a Democrat, served in the United States House of Representatives from 1993 to 2007 as the representative for Massachusetts's 5th congressional district.

== Early life and education ==
Meehan was born in Lowell, Massachusetts, one of seven children born to Martin T. Meehan (d. 2000), a compositor for The Lowell Sun, and Alice (Britton) Meehan (d. 2008). He graduated from Lowell High School in 1974.

Meehan attended the University of Massachusetts Lowell, graduating cum laude in 1978 with a Bachelor of Science degree in education and political science. In 1981, Meehan graduated from Suffolk University with a Master of Public Administration degree, and a Juris Doctor from the Suffolk University Law School in 1986. He has received honorary degrees from the American College of Greece, Suffolk University, Green Mountain College in Vermont, and Shenkar College of Engineering & Design in Israel.

== Early career ==
From 1978 to 1979, Meehan served on the staff to Lowell mayor Raymond F. Rourke. He was the press assistant to Representative James Michael Shannon from 1979 to 1981 and the head research analyst for the Massachusetts Senate's joint committee on election laws from 1981 to 1984.

After completing law school, Meehan served as Director of Public Affairs to the Massachusetts Secretary of the Commonwealth and Deputy Secretary of State for Securities and Corporations from 1986 to 1990. From 1987 to 1988, Meehan was a member of the faculty of the University of Massachusetts Lowell and Harvard Law School. From 1991 to 1992, Meehan was the First Assistant District Attorney for Middlesex County, where he established an innovative "priority prosecution" policy that targeted hardened criminals.

== U.S. House of Representatives ==
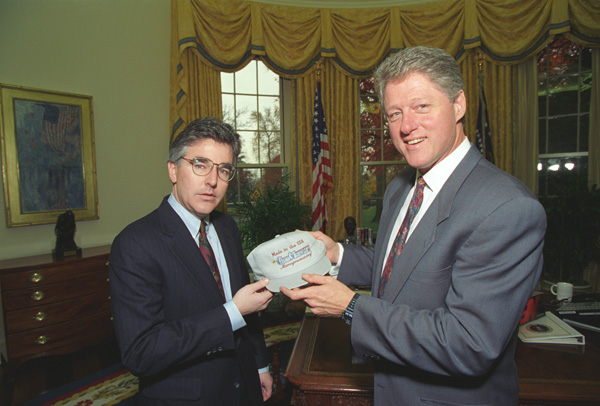
Meehan with President Bill Clinton in 1993

Meehan ran for the U.S. House in the 1992 election, challenging another Democrat, the 4-term incumbent Chet Atkins. Atkins had a record of weak performances in Meehan's hometown of Lowell, only winning the city by 2 votes in his close-run 1990 re-election campaign. Atkins also was caught up in the House Bank overdraft scandal, with 127 overdrafts, the second most in the Massachusetts delegation. The delegation leader in bank overdrafts, Joseph Early with 140, lost re-election in 1992 to Republican Peter Blute. Meehan beat Atkins, receiving 50,300 votes to Atkins' 26,855.

After winning the Democratic primary, Meehan was elected on November 3, 1992. He took office in January 1993.

=== Tenure ===
Meehan is generally considered to be a political liberal. Meehan is a prominent advocate for campaign finance reform and was one of the major sponsors of Bipartisan Campaign Reform Act (called the "Shays–Meehan Bill" in the House and the "McCain–Feingold Bill" in the Senate). He has also been noted for his activism on gay rights issues, and was the chief sponsor of the measure repealing the don't ask, don't tell policy.

Meehan successfully ran for the House in 1992 on a platform of reform, including a commitment to pushing through term limits for members of the House. As part of that platform, Meehan made a pledge not to serve more than four terms. On the House floor in 1995, he scolded members who might go back on their promise to limit their tenure in office. "The best test of any politicians' credibility on term limits," he said, "is whether they are willing to put their careers where their mouths are and limit their own service." Despite his pledge, Meehan again ran for Congress in the year 2000, exceeding four terms by two and a half times.

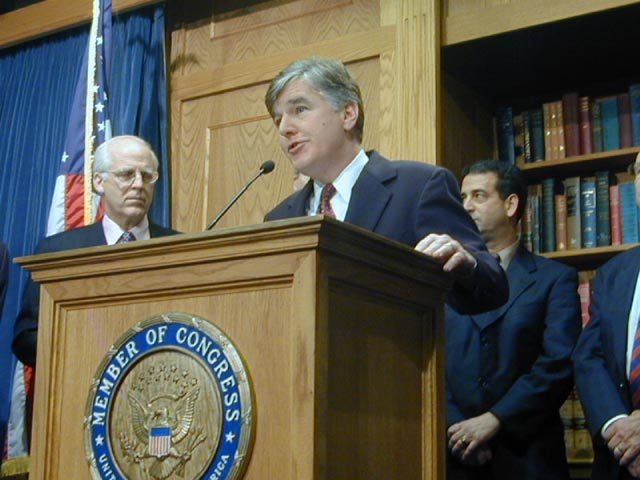
Meehan celebrates gaining enough votes to bring his campaign finance reform bill to the floor.

On October 10, 2002, Meehan was among the 81 House Democrats who voted in favor of authorizing the invasion of Iraq. In January 2005, nearly three years after the fall of Saddam Hussein's regime and as U.S. troops faced an "increasingly sophisticated insurgency in Iraq," Meehan published a Congressional white paper advocating that Iraqi security responsibilities be transferred to a new democratically elected government and that the U.S. develop an exit strategy to remove troops within 12 months to 18 months. During a discussion panel at the Brookings Institution, Meehan expressed concerns about the Bush administration having "no endgame in sight." He told the panel that "it's time for Congress to reassert its role in foreign policy and to take the lead in providing an exit strategy in Iraq."

Meehan's campaign fund was among the largest campaign accounts of any House member, with $4,829,540 cash on hand reported on October 15, 2005. This is the result of raising more money than he spent in several campaigns since his first in 1992. In 2016, after his first year as president of UMass, Meehan closed his congressional campaign signaling an end to his political career so he could focus his energies on leading the UMass system.

In the 2004 Congressional race, Meehan raised $3,170,733 and spent $459,977 of that, thus adding $2,710,756 to his cash on hand. His opponent, Tom Tierney raised $30,943 and spent $30,406. Overall, in the 2004 race, incumbents in the House of Representatives on average raised $1,122,505 compared to $192,964 for their challengers.

Harold Brown Jr. interned with Meehan while studying at George Washington University. He went to work for the Central Intelligence Agency and was killed in action at the Camp Chapman attack.

Meehan was mentioned as a possible candidate for the U.S. Senate in 2004, if Massachusetts' junior senator, John Kerry, had been elected to the presidency.

Meehan worked with former Marine Staff Sgt. Eric Alva and a bipartisan group of representatives to Capitol Hill to reintroduce the Military Readiness Enhancement Act, legislation that would repeal the Pentagon's "don't ask, don't tell" policy regarding gay service members.

==== Former committee assignments ====
- House Committee on Armed Services
  - Subcommittee on Military Personnel
  - Oversight and Investigations (Former Chairman)
- House Committee on the Judiciary
  - Subcommittee on Crime, Terrorism, and Homeland Security
  - Subcommittee on Commercial and Administrative Law
  - Subcommittee on Courts, the Internet, and Intellectual Property
  - Subcommittee on Immigration, Border Security, and Claims

==== Former congressional caucuses ====
- Congressional Biomedical Research Caucus
- Congressional Caucus on Armenian Issues
- Congressional Fire Services Caucus
- Congressional Human Rights Caucus
- Congressional Manufacturing Task Force (founder)
- Congressional Task Force on Tobacco and Health (co-chair)
- Minor League Baseball Caucus
- National Guard & Reserve Components Congressional Members Organization
- Northeast-Midwest Congressional Coalition (co-chair)
- Sustainable Development Caucus (co-chair)

==== Wikipedia editing ====
An unidentified individual operating through the U.S. House of Representatives' internet connection made several favorable edits as well as removing statements declaring Meehan's original campaign platform that included a promise not to run for more than four terms. Meehan's chief of staff at the time, Matt Vogel, admitted to the press that he oversaw the edits and removal of the section that pointed out Meehan's decision not to step down from office after four terms.

==== Retirement from Congress ====
On May 9, 2007, Meehan delivered an official resignation statement to the Speaker of the House, Rep. Nancy Pelosi (D-CA), indicating that he would leave his post on 1 July 2007.

In response, Gov. Deval Patrick (D-MA) announced a September 4 primary and an October 16 special election to determine Meehan's successor. The winner was Niki Tsongas, the widow of Paul Tsongas, who held the seat from 1974 to 1979 before being elected to the Senate.

Meehan's former chief of staff, Lori Trahan, won his former seat, now numbered as the 3rd District, in 2018.

== University of Massachusetts ==
Meehan became the President of the University of Massachusetts, a position he assumed in July 2015, after serving as Chancellor of the University of Massachusetts Lowell since September 2007. On May 1, 2015, the University of Massachusetts Board of Trustees unanimously elected Meehan, citing his record of achievement while serving as the Chancellor at UMass Lowell, his record of public service throughout his career, and his ability to communicate and to inspire, as being among the reasons for selecting him as the 27th President of the Massachusetts University System. Meehan is the first former graduate of a UMass school to serve as President of the UMass System.

Meehan was inaugurated at the Edward M. Kennedy Institute for the United States Senate on November 12, 2015, where he vowed to fight for the University of Massachusetts, calling it "the most important institution in Massachusetts in the critical areas of social mobility and economic growth."

Meehan made raising money for scholarship funds the centerpiece of his inauguration. With an initial fundraising target of $1 million, the privately funded inauguration far exceeded its goals and generated a record $1.7 million for student scholarships.

In his first year of presidency, the University's enrollment reached a record 73,744 students, and research expenditures had risen to a high of $629 million. UMass increased its own funding of financial aid by nearly $20 million during Meehan's first year, with spending rising from $236 million to a record $255 million, the highest ever. Additionally, the UMass Foundation, in part based on Meehan's recommendation, voted to divest direct investments in fossil fuels from the university's endowment, making it the first major public university in the nation to take such action.

As Meehan began his second year as President of the UMass System, he announced the closing of his congressional campaign, directed that funds be transferred to an education foundation, and stipulated that a $1 million scholarship donation be made to his alma mater, UMass Lowell.

During his years at UMass Lowell, the institution achieved record growth in enrollment, student retention and funding for research and scholarships.

During his tenure as chancellor, UMass Lowell for the first time was named a top-tier national university. It also was the top-ranked public research institution in New England for starting salary, mid-career salary and overall return on investment for graduates according to PayScale.com. Under Meehan's leadership, UMass Lowell opened 10 new buildings over a five-year period, was named to the President's Higher Education Honor Roll for community service and campus engagement for six years in a row and made a successful transition to NCAA Division I athletics.

Meehan was presented with the Association of College Unions International (ACUI) 2014 President of the Year Award at the organization's 100th anniversary celebration and conference. He was honored by the Council for Advancement and Support of Education (CASE) at the annual District I program in 2012 with the Chief Executive Leadership Award.

=== UMass Boston ===
On April 5, 2017, University of Massachusetts Boston officials announced that Chancellor J. Keith Motley would resign at the end of the academic calendar year on June 30, take a one-year sabbatical, and return as a tenured faculty member. Meehan stated that UMass Boston Deputy Chancellor Barry Mills, appointed the previous month, would serve as interim chancellor "until [university] finances are stabilized and the university is positioned to attract a world-class chancellor through a global search", specifically to address the university's 2017 operating budget deficit of $30 million. In response to the appointment of Mills and Motley's resignation announcement, UMass Boston faculty publicly expressed concern that Motley was being scapegoated for the university's budget deficit while Boston City Councilors Tito Jackson and Ayanna Pressley, Massachusetts State Senator Linda Dorcena Forry, and Massachusetts State Representative Russell Holmes called upon Meehan to reject Motley's resignation. On April 8, 2017, at a UMass System Board of Trustees meeting, UMass Boston faculty and students protested decisions by university administration to cut offerings of courses (many required for graduation) in the upcoming summer semester, as well as other programs and to make expense adjustments which reduced the deficit to approximately $6 million or $7 million.

On July 1, 2017, Barry Mills became interim chancellor. In November 2017, an audit Meehan commissioned from KPMG was presented to the System Board of Trustees that found that faulty record keeping, a lack of discipline in its budgeting process, and a failure on the part of UMass Boston administration to appreciate the cost of the campus renewal construction projects on the university's operating budget led to the university's $30 million budget deficit, and in the same month, the university laid-off 36 employees after laying off about 100 non-tenure track faculty earlier in the year. In April 2018, University of Massachusetts Amherst and Mount Ida College administrators announced that the former school would acquire the latter's campus in Newton after the latter college's closure. The acquisition was immediately opposed by UMass Boston faculty and students due to inadequate consultation with the Boston campus faculty, the Boston campus' budget deficit, and that because of the proximity of the Mount Ida campus to the Boston campus, the faculty contended that the new campus would compete with the Boston campus.

In April 2018, the UMass Boston campus was the sole majority-minority campus in the UMass System. In May 2018, following the approval of the sale by the office of Massachusetts Attorney General Maura Healey, the UMass Boston Faculty Council passed a motion of no confidence in Meehan and the System Board of Trustees. In the same month, 10 days after three finalists for the UMass Boston Chancellor position were named, on May 21, 2018, all three finalists withdrew from consideration after faculty members questioned the qualifications of the candidates. On June 20, 2018, UMass System Senior Vice President for Academic Affairs Katherine Newman was appointed as the university's interim Chancellor by the System Board of Trustees effective July 1, 2018.

In May 2019, the Pioneer Institute released a white paper co-authored by former Massachusetts State Representative Gregory W. Sullivan (who also served as the Massachusetts Inspector General) that reviewed records obtained from the UMass System Controller's Office (as well as other publicly available documents) that concluded that Chancellor Keith Motley and other UMass Boston administrators were scapegoated for the 2017 fiscal year $30 million budget deficit and that instead the approval by the System Board of Trustees of an accelerated 5-year capital spending plan in December 2014 without assuring that capital reserves would be made available to pay for the plan, as well as an error to a 5-year campus reserve ratio estimate prepared by the UMass Central Budget Office and presented to the System Board of Trustees in April 2016, was the cause of the $26 million in budget reductions implemented by interim Chancellor Barry Mills and that the reductions made at the direction of the UMass Central Office.

Additionally, the white paper states that KPMG's 2017 audit was not conducted in accordance with Generally Accepted Government Auditing Standards or reported in accordance with auditing standards prescribed by the American Institute of Certified Public Accountants, and that the purchase of Mount Ida College in April 2018 was conducted by a wire transfer from the UMass System for $75 million without being included on the previously approved university capital plan at the time the UMass Central Office ordered the budget reductions rather than UMass Amherst purchasing the Mount Ida campus with loanable funds to be repaid with interest (and in contrast to how the transaction was described in a press statement issued by Meehan's office). The following month, interim Chancellor Katherine Newman issued a press statement disputing the findings of the white paper.

In September 2019, the UMass Boston Faculty Staff Union President addressed the System Board of Trustees to protest the potential offering of equivalent programs at the Mount Ida campus that are already offered at the Boston campus. The following December, the UMass Boston Faculty Staff Union President presented the board with a petition from the Boston campus faculty reiterating their concerns about the Mount Ida campus and requesting more input into its planning. On February 10, 2020, University of California, Los Angeles Dean Marcelo Suárez-Orozco was unanimously appointed as the new permanent chancellor of the university succeeding Katharine Newman, and Suárez-Orozco assumed the position on August 1, 2020.

=== Board appointments ===
Meehan is on the Board of Trustees at Natixis Global Asset Management and on the Board of Governors at Lowell General Hospital. Previously, he has served on the Board of Directors at Sage Bank (formerly Lowell Cooperative Bank), Qteros (formerly SunEthanol), D'Youville Foundation, and was a member of the Board of Trustees of Suffolk University.

== Personal life ==
In 1996, Meehan married Ellen T. Murphy. They had two children together: Daniel Martin and Robert Francis Meehan. The couple divorced in 2016.

In July 2022, Meehan married Jennifer Maguire Meehan (formerly Jennifer Maguire Hanson), the Director of Philanthropy at Lowell General Hospital. Widowed in 2018, she has two daughters, Caroline and Ella Hanson.

U.S. House of Representatives
Preceded by Chester Atkins	Member of the U.S. House of Representatives from Massachusetts's 5th congressional district 1993–2007	Succeeded by Niki Tsongas
U.S. order of precedence (ceremonial)
Preceded by Cynthia McKinney as Former U.S. Representative	Order of precedence of the United States as Former U.S. Representative	Succeeded by Albert Wynn as Former U.S. Representative
