= George B. Arfken =

American physicist (1922–2020)

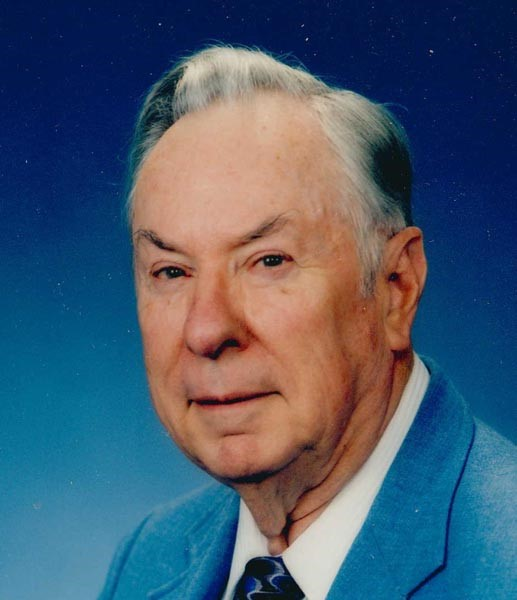
- Born: November 20, 1922; Jersey City, New Jersey, U.S.
- Died: October 8, 2020 (aged 97)
- Education: Yale University, 1943
- Spouses: Carolyn Arfken née Dines (1949-1997); Mary Arfken née Parrett (1999-2010)
- Scientific career
- Fields: Theoretical physics, mathematical physics

George Brown Arfken (November 20, 1922 – October 8, 2020) was an American theoretical physicist and the author of several mathematical physics texts. He was a physics professor at Miami University from 1952 to 1983 and the chair of the Miami University physics department 1956–1972. He was an emeritus professor at Miami University. Arfken was also an authority on Canadian philately.

== Education ==
Arfken graduated from Montclair High School. He received a Bachelor of Engineering degree in chemical engineering from Yale University in 1943. He earned a master's degree in physics in 1948 and a doctorate in 1950, both at Yale.

== Personal life ==
George was born November 20, 1922, to George, Sr. and Ann (nee Hill) Arfken in Jersey City, NJ. He received a Bachelor of Engineering from Yale in 1943. Enlisting in the U.S. Navy, he served as a lieutenant (junior grade) in the Amphibious Forces in the Western Pacific. He returned to Yale in September 1946 and graduated with a Ph.D. in physics in 1950.

Arfken married Carolyn Dines, a graduate of Westminster College of Pennsylvania, in 1949, and they raised three children together. She died in 1997. In 1998, Arfken endowed a scholar-in-residence program in her name at Miami University. George married Mary Seet in 1999.

In retirement Arfken played a major role in developing the postal history of Canada for the 60-year period 1851–1911, following the pioneering work of Allan Steinhart. This was primarily a study of the postal rates, the routes the mail followed, and the postal markings on the envelopes and postcards. Arfken wrote one book on the United States' first postage-due stamps and then, with coauthors, nine books on the early Canadian postage and registration stamps. In addition there were over 250 articles in philatelic journals. George was inducted into the Order of the Beaver, the Fellowship of BNAPS, in 1996, and named a Fellow of the Royal Philatelic Society of Canada in 2001. He also received the Royal Philatelic Society of Canada’s Geldert Medal for best article in 1989. For BNAPEX convention exhibits between 1984 and 1996, he received four Gold medals and one Reserve Grand award.

He died in October 2020 at the age of 97.

== Selected publications ==
Articles

- 1949: S-Wave Proton-Proton Scattering from 0.2 to 40 Mev for the Yukawa and Gauss Error Potentials, Physical Review Volume 75
- 1953: A Vector Addition Coefficient Identity, Physical Review Volume 92
- 1961: Ionization of the interplanetary gas, Los Alamos Scientific Lab
- 1973: Comment on “Elementary Use of Spheroidal Coordinates”, American Journal of Physics Volume 41, Issue 12, pp. 1375

Books

- 1966: Mathematical Methods for Physicists ISBN 0123846544
- 1989: University Physics ISBN 0155929747, coauthored with David F. Griffing and Donald C. Kelly
- 1989: Canada's Small Queen Era - Postage Usage During the Small Queen Era, 1870-1897
- 2003: Essential Mathematical Methods for Physicists ISBN 9780120598779, coauthored with Hans J. Weber, Frank E. Harris
