= Military Readiness Enhancement Act =

The Military Readiness Enhancement Act was a bill introduced in the U.S. House of Representatives in several sessions between 2005 and 2009. It would have amended title 10, United States Code to include a policy of nondiscrimination on the basis of sexual orientation, replacing the policy known as "Don't ask, don't tell" (DADT), which banned disclosing one's homosexuality while serving in the Armed Forces.

The bill remained stalled in committee each time it was introduced. In 2010, its backers succeeded in repealing DADT effective September 2011, without establishing a nondiscrimination policy.

== Legislative history ==
Rep. Marty Meehan introduced the legislation in the 109th on March 2, 2005, and 110th Congress on March 28, 2007. Rep. Ellen Tauscher introduced it in the 111th Congress on March 3, 2009. Patrick Murphy took over the sponsorship of the legislation after Tauscher's resignation in June 2009.

The 2005 bill had 122 cosponsors and the 2007 bill had 149 cosponsors. They were both referred to the House Committee on Armed Services and the Subcommittee on Military Personnel but failed to advance. The 2009 bill had 192 cosponsors as of April 22, 2010, and was referred to the House Committee on Armed Services and the Subcommittee on Military Personnel. The 192 cosponsors in the House of Representatives included 190 Democrats and two Republicans, Ileana Ros-Lehtinen and Joseph Cao.

Congress	Short title	Bill number(s)	Date introduced	Sponsor(s)	# of cosponsors	Latest status
111th Congress	Military Readiness Enhancement Act of 2009	S. 3065	August 5, 2009	Sen. Joe Lieberman (ID-CT)	33	Referred the Armed Services Committee
111th Congress	Military Readiness Enhancement Act of 2009	H.R. 1283	March 3, 2009	Ellen Tauscher (D-CA); Patrick Murphy (D-PA)	192	Referred to Subcommittee on Military Personnel
110th Congress	Military Readiness Enhancement Act of 2007	H.R. 1246	March 28, 2007	Marty Meehan (D-MA)	149	Referred to Subcommittee on Military Personnel
109th Congress	Military Readiness Enhancement Act of 2005	H.R. 1059	March 2, 2005	Marty Meehan (D-MA)	122	Referred to Subcommittee on Military Personnel

== Debate on DADT repeal ==
Supporters of the repeal wanted Congress to eliminate the policy with the 2010 defense authorization bill in April 2009. In July 2009, Patrick Murphy announced a "Voices of Honor" tour with the Human Rights Campaign to increase awareness of his non-discrimination bill. On October 16, 2009, The Hill reported that Congressional leaders expected the repeal of DADT to pass in early 2010. President Barack Obama stated that if passed by Congress, he would sign a bill repealing DADT.

On March 3, 2010, Sen. Joseph Lieberman introduced the legislation, now called the Military Readiness Enhancement Act of 2010, in the Senate with original cosponsors including Democratic Sens. Carl Levin of Michigan, Mark Udall of Colorado, Kirsten Gillibrand of New York, Roland Burris of Illinois, Jeff Bingaman of New Mexico, Barbara Boxer of California, Ron Wyden of Oregon, Patrick Leahy of Vermont, Arlen Specter of Pennsylvania, Jeff Merkley of Oregon, and Dianne Feinstein of California. Nine more Senate Democrats announced their support on March 9.

The House of Representatives voted 234–194 to add language based on the Military Readiness Enhancement Act, the Murphy amendment, to the National Defense Authorization Act for Fiscal 2011 on May 27, 2010. On September 21, 2010, John McCain led a successful (56 in favor, 43 opposed) filibuster against ending Senate debate on the Defense Authorization Act. Following additional legislative maneuvering, Murphy introduced the Don't Ask, Don't Tell Repeal Act of 2010, which eliminated the policy without prohibiting discrimination based on sexual orientation, on December 10, and Sens. Lieberman and Susan Collins introduced it in the Senate, The House passed it on a vote of 250 to 175 on December 15, 2010, and the Senate passed it by a vote of 65–31 on December 18, 2010.
