= University of Massachusetts Lowell =

Public research university in Lowell, Massachusetts, U.S.

- Former names: Lowell Normal School (South Campus); Lowell Textile Institute (North Campus); Lowell Technological Institute (North Campus); Lowell State College (South Campus); University of Lowell
- Type: Public research university
- Established: 1894; 132 years ago
- Founder: Joseph Conti
- Parent institution: University of Massachusetts
- Accreditation: NECHE
- Academic affiliations: CUMU; ORAU; Space-grant
- Endowment: $200 million (2025)
- Chancellor: Julie Chen
- Provost: Lynne Cossman
- Academic staff: 599 full-time, 417 part-time
- Students: 16,797 (fall 2024)
- Undergraduates: 12,122 (fall 2024)
- Postgraduates: 4,675 (fall 2024)
- Location: Lowell, Massachusetts, United States; 42.642716°N 71.334530°W
- Campus: Urban 150 acres
- Colors: Blue, white, and red
- Nickname: River Hawks
- Sporting affiliations: NCAA Division I America East; Hockey East
- Mascot: Rowdy the River Hawk
- Website: www.uml.edu

The University of Massachusetts Lowell (UMass Lowell or UML) is a public research university in Lowell, Massachusetts, with a satellite campus in Haverhill, Massachusetts. It is the northernmost member of the University of Massachusetts public university system and has been accredited by the New England Commission of Higher Education (NECHE) since 1975. With 1,110 faculty members and over 18,000 students, it is the largest university in the Merrimack Valley and the second-largest public institution in the state. It is classified among "R1: Doctoral Universities – Very high research spending and doctorate production".

The university offers 120 bachelor's degree, 43 master's degree, and 25 doctoral degree programs. The university is one of the few public universities in the United States to offer accredited undergraduate degrees in meteorology, sound recording technology, nuclear engineering and plastics engineering. It was the first to offer a degree in music education. Academically, UMass Lowell is organized into six schools and colleges: the College of Fine Arts, Humanities and Social Sciences; the College of Education; the Kennedy College of Sciences; the Francis College of Engineering; the Manning School of Business; and the Zuckerberg College of Health Sciences.

== History ==
Coburn Hall in 1899

The University of Massachusetts Lowell owes its origins to two institutions founded in the 1890s: Lowell State College on the south side of the Merrimack River and Lowell Technological Institute on the north side. Each would follow its own path of expansion through the 20th century.

=== Lowell State College ===
Lowell State College got its start as the Lowell Normal School, which was chartered in 1894 as a teacher-training institution for women. The 10th and final normal school to be established in Massachusetts, it opened in 1898 with 108 students and five faculty members. The original classroom building opened the next year at the corner of Broadway and Wilder streets, and quickly became a landmark in the city. Designed by local firm Stickney & Austin, it reflects the fashion of the time: high-style Beaux Arts with classical symmetry, arches, cast-iron lampposts and yellow brick. Its design was influenced in part by Lowell High School, which was also designed by Lowell native Frederick W. Stickney. Frank Coburn, for whom the hall was later named, served as the school's first principal until 1908.

After being threatened with closure during the Great Depression, school administrators rallied local support to help keep it open. A delegation of prominent individuals representing Lowell's powerful interest groups traveled to Boston and convinced state officials of the school's importance. The result was that the school not only survived, but continued to grow and expand. In 1950, Dr. Daniel O'Leary assumed the presidency and initiated an ambitious building program. The physical plant of the campus expanded during post-war era from a single structure to a multi-building complex, forming an area now known as UMass Lowell's South Campus.

As the demand for more qualified teachers grew, the legislature reorganized the Normal School into Lowell State College in 1960 with a curriculum that expanded beyond education to include baccalaureate degrees in other fields including nursing and music. Beginning in 1967, the college was authorized to confer two more degrees: Master of Education and Master of Music Education.

=== Lowell Technological Institute ===
Southwick Hall in 1903

World War I era photo of Southwick and Kitson Hall

Established in 1895 as the Lowell Textile School, the institution was founded to train technicians and managers for work in Lowell's booming textile industry. Modeled after the now-defunct Polytechnic College of Pennsylvania, Lowell Textile was the combined effort of the Commonwealth of Massachusetts and corporations eager to form a school dedicated to textile education. Under the guidance of founder James T. Smith, Lowell Textile opened its doors in February 1897 in the upper floors of a downtown commercial block located on Middle Street. The school offered three-year training programs in cotton and wool manufacturing, design, textile chemistry and dyeing.

In 1903, the school moved from downtown to its permanent location just northwest of the Merrimack River. The yellow brick mill-like Southwick Hall was dedicated to Royal and Dierexa Southwick. Grandparents of the wealthy businessman Frederick Ayer, the Southwicks were Quakers and abolitionists who came to Lowell in the 1820s to help establish the Lowell Carpet Company. Ten years later, the school granted its first bachelor's degrees in textile dyeing and textile engineering.

In 1953, President Martin Lydon expanded the curriculum to include programs in plastics, leather, paper and electronics technology, increased the liberal arts offerings and renamed the school the Lowell Technological Institute. He moved the institute decisively toward general engineering, setting up a bachelor's program in 1956. The textile program was closed in 1971, reflecting the closure of most of the mills in the city.

=== University of Lowell ===
In 1972, a feasibility study was conducted on merging Lowell State College with Lowell Technological Institute. Lowell State and Lowell Tech merged in 1975 as the University of Lowell. Durgin Hall, with its 1000-seat performance venue, was dedicated as the home of the Music Department. The Manning School of Business (then the College of Management Science) was accredited. The College of Education became certified to offer a doctorate in education (Ed.D.). The College of Health Professions (now the Zuckerberg College of Health Sciences) was established. Enrollment increased 58% by 1985.

=== Merger with University of Massachusetts ===
In 1991, the Lowell campus joined the University of Massachusetts system under its current name. Under Chapter 142, the UMass system was restructured to combine the Amherst, Boston, and Worcester campuses with the University of Lowell and Southeastern Massachusetts University (now UMass Dartmouth).

=== Recent developments ===
In 2019, a sexual harassment complaint against Associate Dean Oliver C. Ibe was settled by the university. The complaint was from a younger female staff member in 2017. Ibe's title of associate dean was removed and he returned to the faculty despite a petition from faculty and staff to have him removed from the campus. He retired the following year.

== Campus ==
UMass Lowell is the second-largest campus in the University of Massachusetts system, and has three campus clusters: North, South, and East. The university's main facilities are located in Lowell, Massachusetts, 25 miles (40 km) northwest of Boston on both sides of the Merrimack River. Between 2013 and 2018, the university increased student housing by more than 2,500 beds, including opening three new residence halls in 2013, 2015, and 2017. In fall 2021, thirty-five percent of undergraduates lived in university–owned, operated, or affiliated housing, including sixty-one percent of first year students.

== Organization and administration ==
The university is governed by a six-member executive cabinet, including and led by the chancellor. The current chancellor is Julie Chen, who was appointed in May 2022. Marty Meehan, former UMass Lowell Chancellor, is currently the president of the entire University of Massachusetts system. He assumed office in July 2015 after serving as the chancellor since September 2007.

== Academics ==
For undergraduate students, the University of Massachusetts Lowell has an acceptance rate of 72 percent, a freshman retention rate of 85 percent, and a graduation rate of 63 percent. In 2016, 87% of first-year students rated their overall educational experience as "good" or "excellent". The average combined SAT score (Critical Reading and Math) for incoming freshmen for fall 2018 was 1233, up nearly 150 points since fall 2010, and the average entering GPA was a 3.60, up from 3.18 in fall 2010. 47% of undergraduate classes had 20 students or fewer in the fall 2018 semester. In 2018, UMass awarded a total of 2,798 bachelor's, 1,102 master's, and 122 doctoral degrees.

=== Online programs ===
The university offers various courses online; in 2018, it had a total online-enrollment of 30,932 which was an increase of 7.4% compared to 2017. Total revenue from online classes in 2018 was $39.1 million.

=== Colleges ===
==== Francis College of Engineering ====
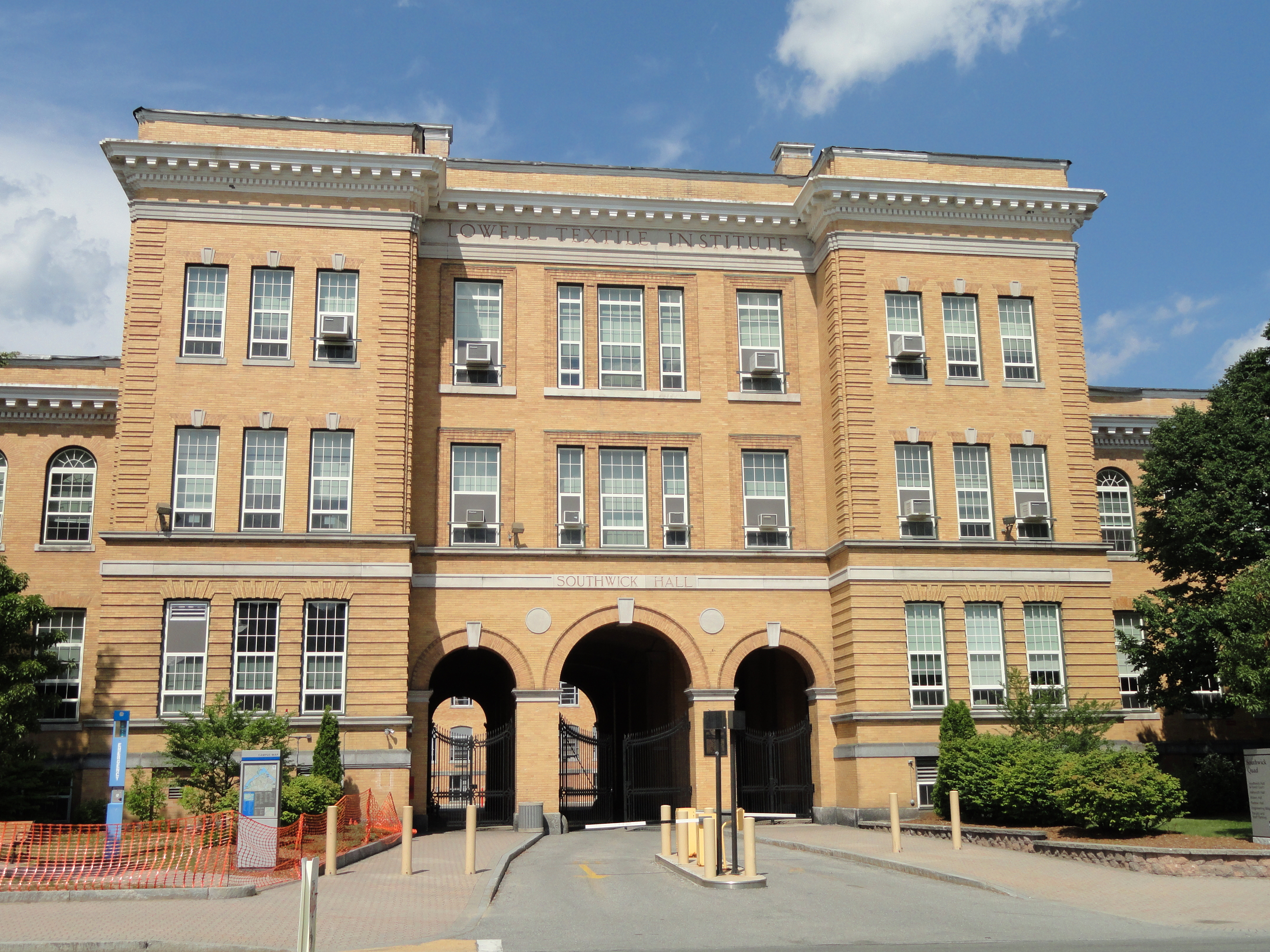
Southwick Hall - University of Massachusetts Lowell

The Francis College of Engineering is named after James B. Francis, a hydraulic engineer who began his career in Lowell during the Industrial Revolution. The college is home to nearly 150 full-time faculty members and 14 research centers, and is fully accredited by ABET. The college is ranked No. 97 by U.S. News & World Report.

UMass Lowell has a radiation laboratory that provides students with real-world experience in particle physics, nuclear engineering and health physics.

The UMass Lowell Baseball Research Center is associated with the College of Engineering. The facility, first funded in 1998, is the official testing center for Major League Baseball, testing bats and baseballs. Those conducting research through the center include mechanical engineering faculty and a full-time staff engineer, and six to 12 student laboratory assistants.

==== Zuckerberg College of Health Sciences ====
The Roy J. Zuckerberg College of Health Sciences includes the Solomont School of Nursing, elevated from a department as of June 1, 2013.

The college has more than 2,100 undergraduate students, 409 graduate students, 82 faculty members and six research centers. The college offers seven degree and certificate programs, including the only doctorate of physical therapy (DPT) degree program offered by a public institution in Massachusetts. It also offers the only graduate degrees in pharmaceutical sciences at a public institution in the Commonwealth. The graduate nursing program is ranked No. 156 in the nation while the graduate physical therapy program is ranked No. 101, according to U.S. News & World Report.

==== College of Fine Arts, Humanities and Social Sciences ====
The College of Fine Arts, Humanities and Social Sciences includes the School of Criminology and Justice Studies, as well as signature programs including sound recording technology, music business, peace and conflict studies, security studies and more. The College of Fine Arts, Humanities and Social Sciences is the largest college at UMass Lowell and offers 24 undergraduate and graduate degree programs and houses seven centers and institutes, including the Kerouac Center for Public Humanities, named for writer Jack Kerouac, a Lowell native.

==== School of Education ====
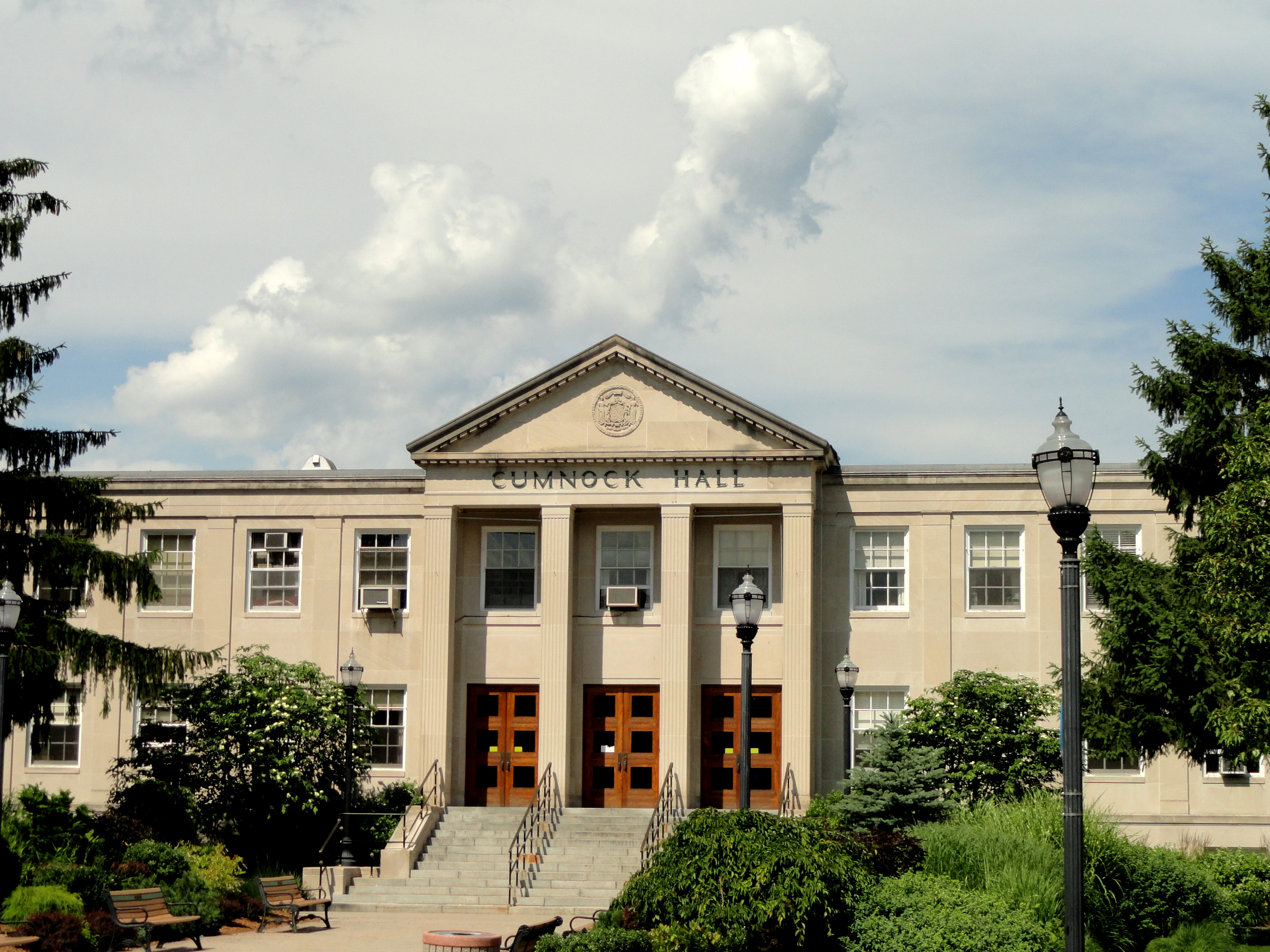
Cumnock Hall - University of Massachusetts Lowell

The School of Education offers bachelor's, master's and doctoral degree programs. The school includes 13 tenure-track faculty members and four clinical faculty members. The school has a 100 percent pass rate on the Massachusetts Tests for Educator Licensure. The online graduate education program is ranked No. 16 in the nation by U.S. News & World Report.

==== William J. and John F. Kennedy College of Sciences ====
The William J. and John F. Kennedy College of Sciences has six departments: Biological Sciences; Chemistry; Computer Science; Environmental, Earth and Atmospheric Sciences; Mathematical Sciences; and Physics and Applied Physics. Originally the UMass Lowell College of Sciences, the college was renamed in honor of two alumni, John F. Kennedy '70 and William J. Kennedy '54, in 2015 (unrelated to the political family).

Research centers associated with the college include the New England Robotics Validation and Testing Center (NERVE), one of the nation's premier robotics research, testing and training facilities. Computer Science professor and NERVE director Holly Yanco is currently collaborating with Northeastern University professors Taskin Padir and Robert Platt in developing NASA's Valkyrie robot to research advancements in cutting-edge humanoid robotics.

The graduate chemistry program is ranked No. 145 and the graduate physics program is ranked No. 124 in the nation by U.S. News & World Report.

==== Miner School of Computer & Information Sciences ====
The Miner School of Computer & Information Sciences was named after Richard A. Miner.

==== Manning School of Business ====
The Manning School of Business is named after Robert J. Manning, the chairman and CEO of MFS Investment Management. The school was named after Manning, a 1984 graduate of UMass Lowell, after he and his wife donated $5 million to the university.

The Manning School of Business consists of five departments: Accounting, Finance, Management, MEI (Marketing, Entrepreneurship, and Innovation), and OIS (Operations and Information Systems). The school offers Bachelor's, Master's, and PhD level degrees.

=== Research ===
Total R&D expenditure was $145 million in FY 2025.

==== Research Centers ====
- Center for Advanced Manufacturing of Polymers and Soft Materials
- Center for Advanced Materials
- Center for Asian American Studies
- Center for Population Health
- Center for Program Evaluation
- Center for the Promotion of Health in the New England Workplace
- Center for Terrorism & Security Studies (CTSS), founded by James J.F. Forest in 2013 and former co-publisher of academic journal Perspectives on Terrorism
- Center for Wind Energy
- Center for Women & Work
- Climate Change Initiative
- Lowell Center for Space Science & Technology
- New England Robotics Validation & Experimentation Center
- Raytheon-UMass Lowell Research Institute
- Saab Center for Portuguese Studies

==== Engagement Centers ====
- Center for Community Research and Engagement
- Center for Public Opinion
- Stella and Jack Kerouac Center for the Public Humanities
- Tsongas Industrial History Center

==== Seed Centers ====
- Biomedical Terahertz Technology Center
- Center for Autism Research and Education (CARE)
- Center for Gerontology Research & Partnerships
- Center for International Security & Forensics Education & Research
- Massachusetts BioManufacturing Center
- Radiation Laboratory

=== University rankings ===
Academic rankings

National
- Forbes: 280
- U.S. News & World Report: 148 (tie)
- Washington Monthly: 255
- WSJ/College Pulse: 137

Global
- U.S. News & World Report: 1180 (tie)

U.S. News & World Report ranks UMass Lowell No. 148 on its National Universities list in the Best Colleges of 2027. U.S. News & World Report also named UMass Lowell No. 74 in the top public universities and second among public universities in Massachusetts. Washington Monthly ranked UMass Lowell No. 163 nationally for 2015, representing a 31-spot jump from 2013. Forbes ranked UMass Lowell No. 202 among research universities and No. 329 overall. University Ranking by Academic Performance for 2019-2020 ranks the university as No. 197 in the country. UMass Lowell is accredited by the New England Commission of Higher Education.

UMass Lowell is known for having one of the highest returns on investment (ROI) in the country for its graduates. Forbes ranked UMass Lowell as the 10th best value among all universities and colleges nationwide for 2013 and fourth-best value among non-military academies. UMass Lowell is one of just 75 institutions in the nation whose graduates have a 30-year net ROI of more than $1 million. PayScale.com found that UMass Lowell provides the 10th best ROI among 437 public universities in the U.S. and 50th out of 1,060 colleges and universities for 2013. PayScale also ranked UMass Lowell 40th in the Northeast Region for highest mid-career salary among graduates of state universities ($95,100) and 80th overall (tied with Boston College).

UMass Lowell has been listed as one of the most underrated colleges in America on multiple occasions. In 2013, Business Insider named UMass Lowell as the "Most Underrated College in America". The 2015 edition has named UMass Lowell as the second-most underrated college in the U.S. behind NJIT.

== Student life ==
Undergraduate demographics as of Fall 2023
Race and ethnicity	Total
White	52%
Hispanic	16%
Asian	14%
Black	9%
Two or more races	3%
Unknown	3%
International student	2%
Economic diversity
Low-income (Note: The percentage of students who received an income-based federal Pell grant intended for low-income students.)	28%
Affluent (Note: The percentage of students who are a part of the American middle class at the bare minimum.)	72%

Total enrollment for the 2019–2020 academic year was 18,338, including 2,481 students in online and continuing education. in the following academic year about 18,400 students enrolled in the university the fall, making it the largest student body to date.

In-state enrollment represented 88.3 percent of undergraduates and 58.4 percent of graduate students. International students made up 3.5 percent of the undergraduate population and 16.2 percent of the graduate population. Students of color represented 36 percent of the total undergraduate population and 25 percent of the graduate population. The male-female ratio for undergraduates in 2018 was 61/39. Total enrollment has increased 50 percent since 2007.

=== Student activities ===
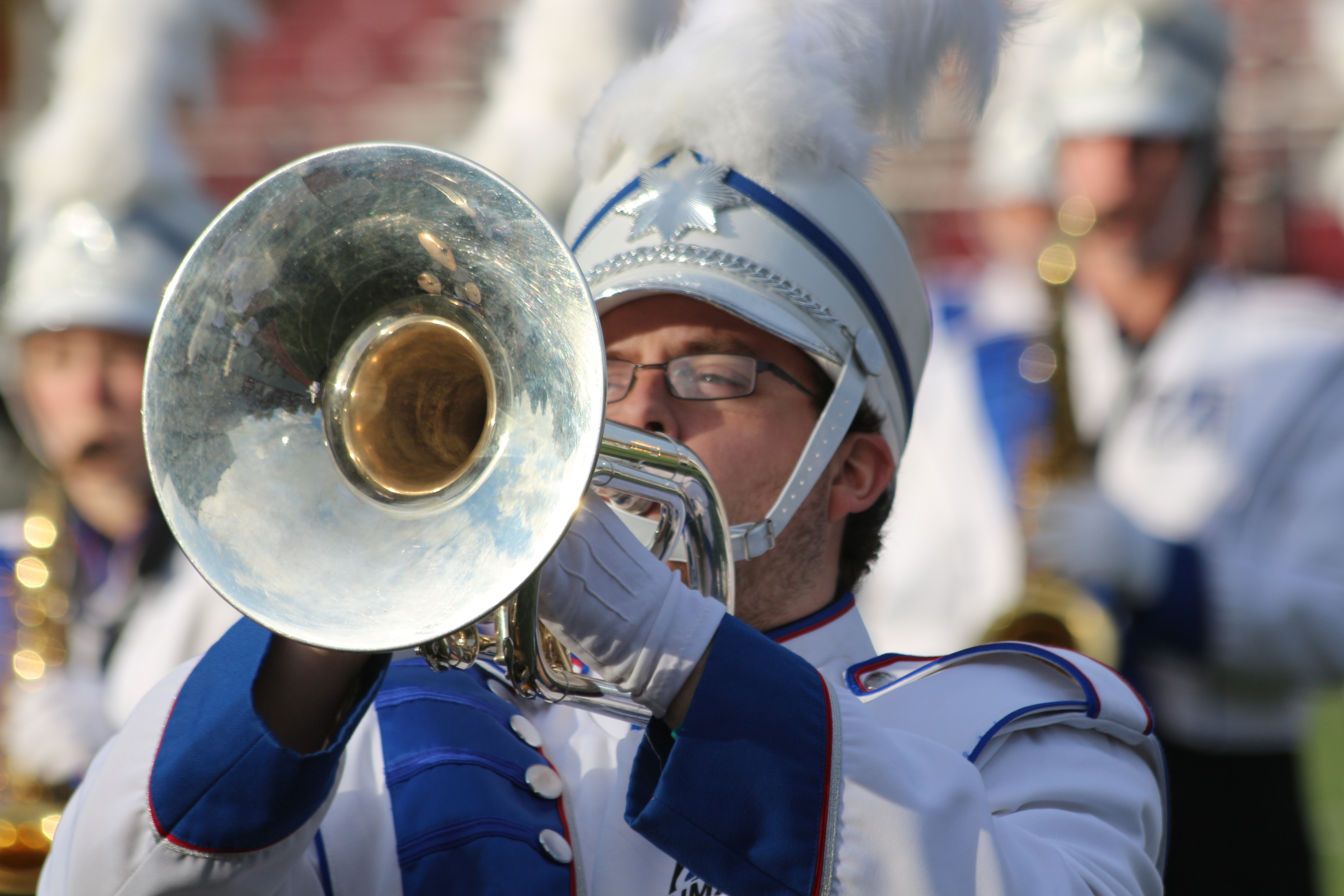
UMass Lowell mellophone player

UMass Lowell has more than 250 student-run organizations.

==== Greek life ====
Greek life was banned from the university campus after a hazing incident in 1987, where a student suffered overheating when left with a sleeping bag over his head near a space heater. Greek life was returned to the campus in 2012.

== Athletics ==
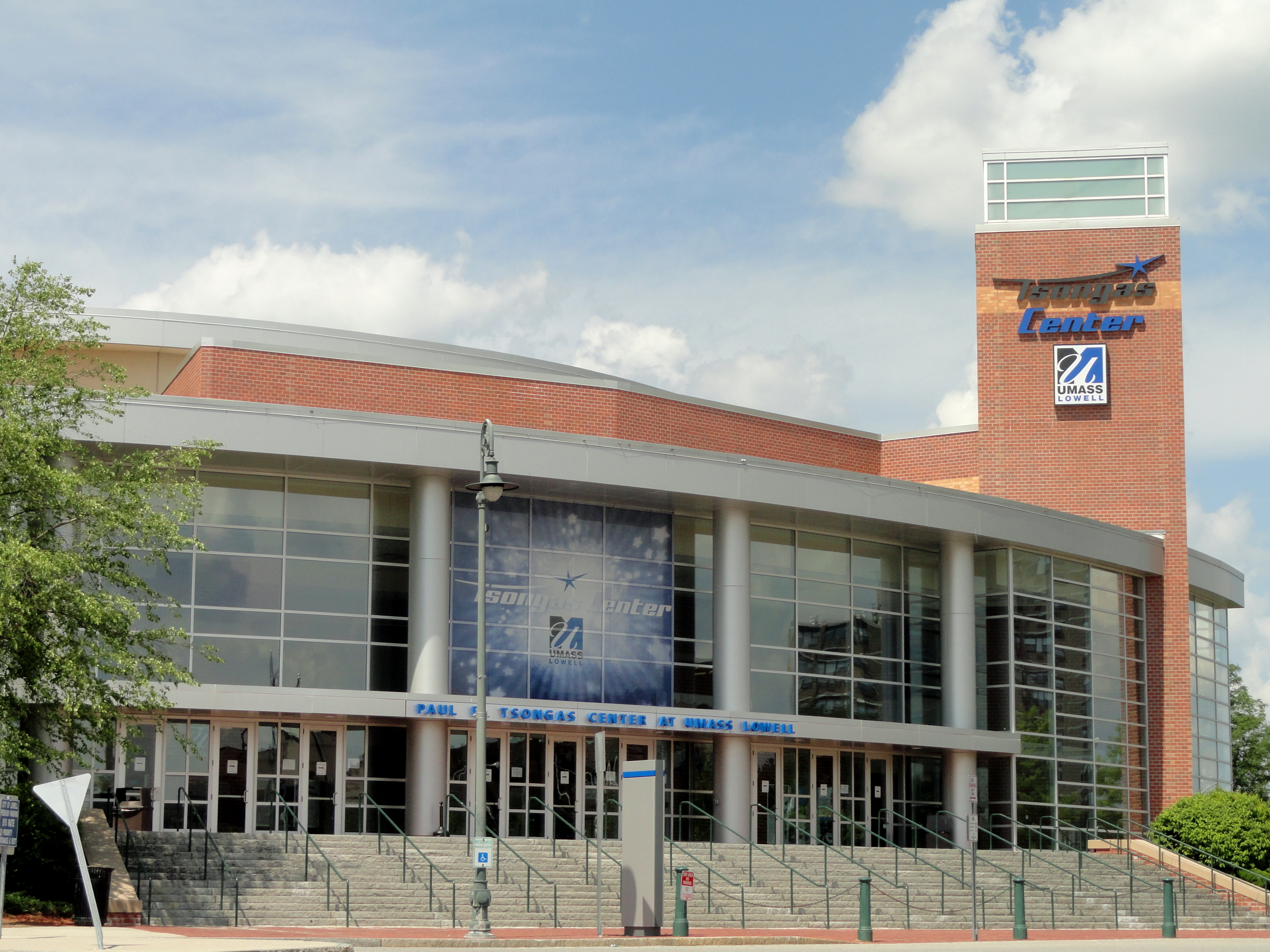
The Tsongas Center at UMass Lowell

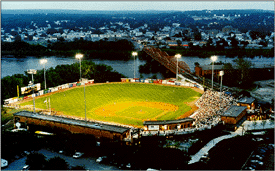
LeLacheur Park, with the Merrimack River in the background, taken from the top of Fox Hall

UMass Lowell athletic teams compete in a variety of men's and women's sports in Division I. Men's sports include baseball, basketball, cross country, ice hockey, lacrosse, track and field, and soccer. Women's sports are basketball, cross country, lacrosse, track and field, field hockey, soccer, and softball. As of July 1, 2013, 14 of UMass Lowell's Division II teams moved up to Division I, joining the America East Conference. The River Hawks, with the exception of men's ice hockey, previously competed in the Northeast-10 Conference at the Division II level. Past champions include the 1988 men's basketball team, the 1991 men's cross country team, the men's ice hockey team (three times) and the field hockey team twice (2005, 2010). The 2010 field hockey team finished its season with a perfect 24–0 record.

The university's men's ice hockey team plays in the Hockey East Association and plays its home games at the Tsongas Center at UMass Lowell. In 2013, the men's hockey team won the Hockey East regular-season and tournament championships and advanced to the NCAA Division I Championship "Frozen Four," all for the first time in the university's history. The men's hockey team repeated as Hockey East champions in 2014 while advancing to the NCAA Division I Men's Ice Hockey Championship for the third straight year and sixth time overall. Goalie Connor Hellebuyck is the only Hockey East player to receive the league tournament's Most Valuable Player Award in two consecutive years, earning the honor in 2013 and 2014.

== Alumni and notable people ==
In 2018, a total of 8,158 alumni were supporting UMass Lowell financially, representing 10.2% of the alumni body. In June 2022, UMass Lowell announced it had received a donation of $5-million from Android Co-founder and alumnus Rich Miner, which included a $2-million matching donation from the state.

This announcement coincided with elevating computer science from a department to a school within the Kennedy College of Sciences, named the Richard A. Miner School of Computer & Information Sciences. The dedication of the Richard Miner School of Computer & Information Sciences occurred on October 26, 2022.

Notable people associated with the university include:

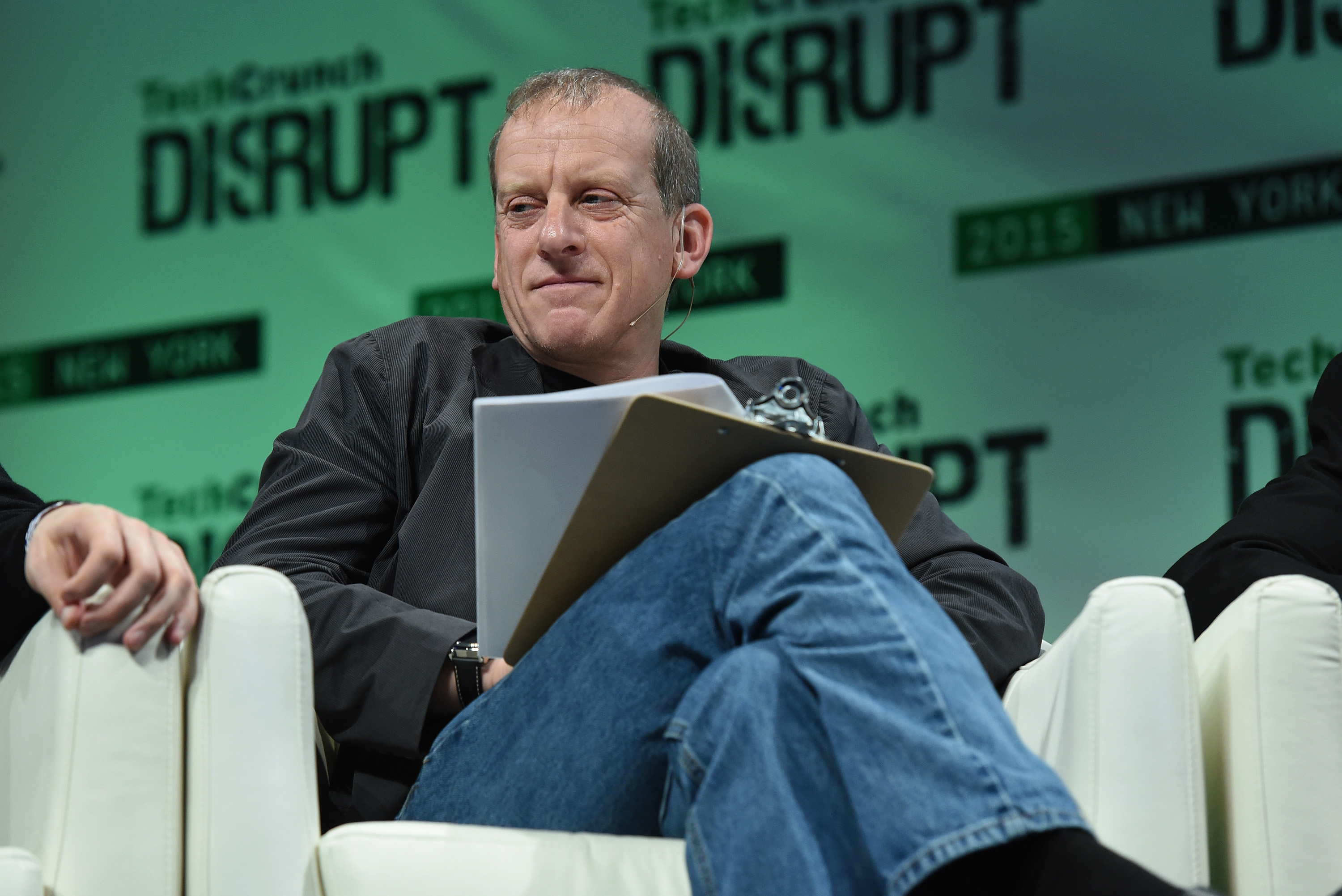
Android Co-Founder and Google Advisor Rich Miner

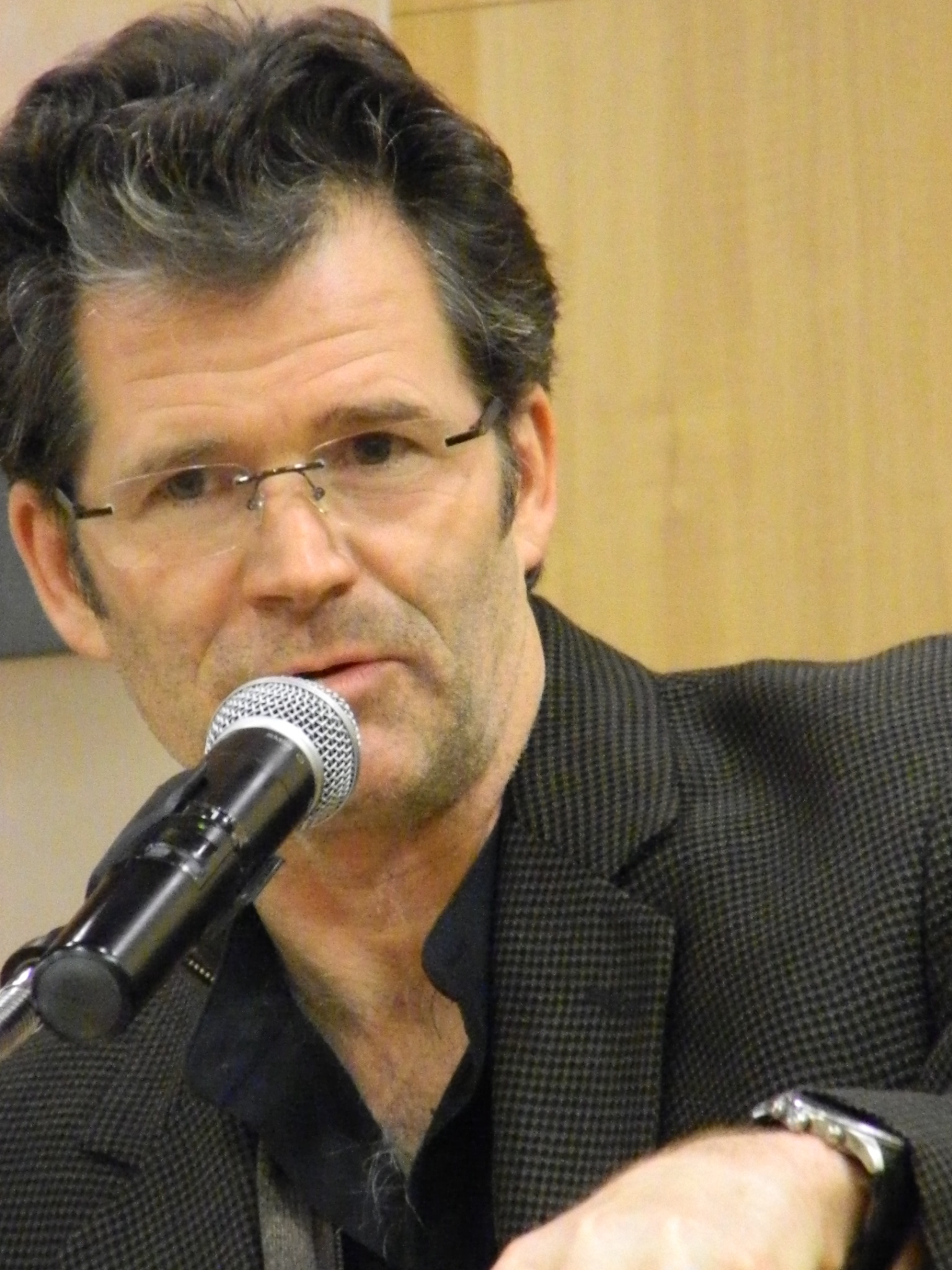
Best-selling author and faculty member Andre Dubus III.

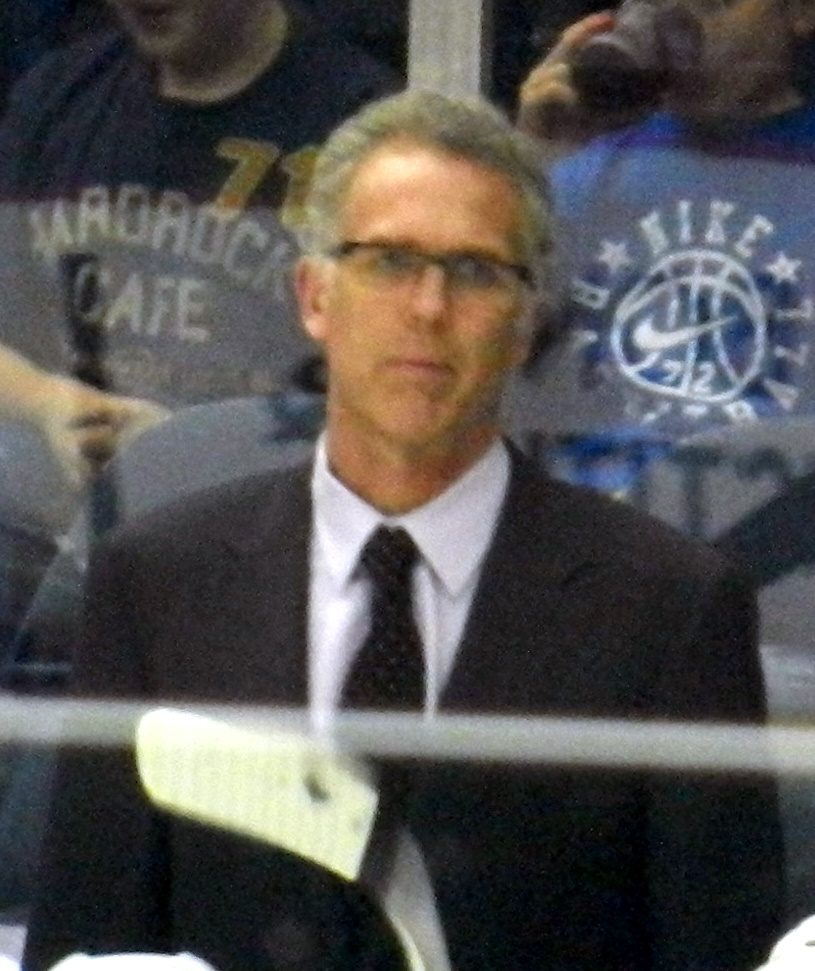
Former NHL player and current GM and coach Craig MacTavish.

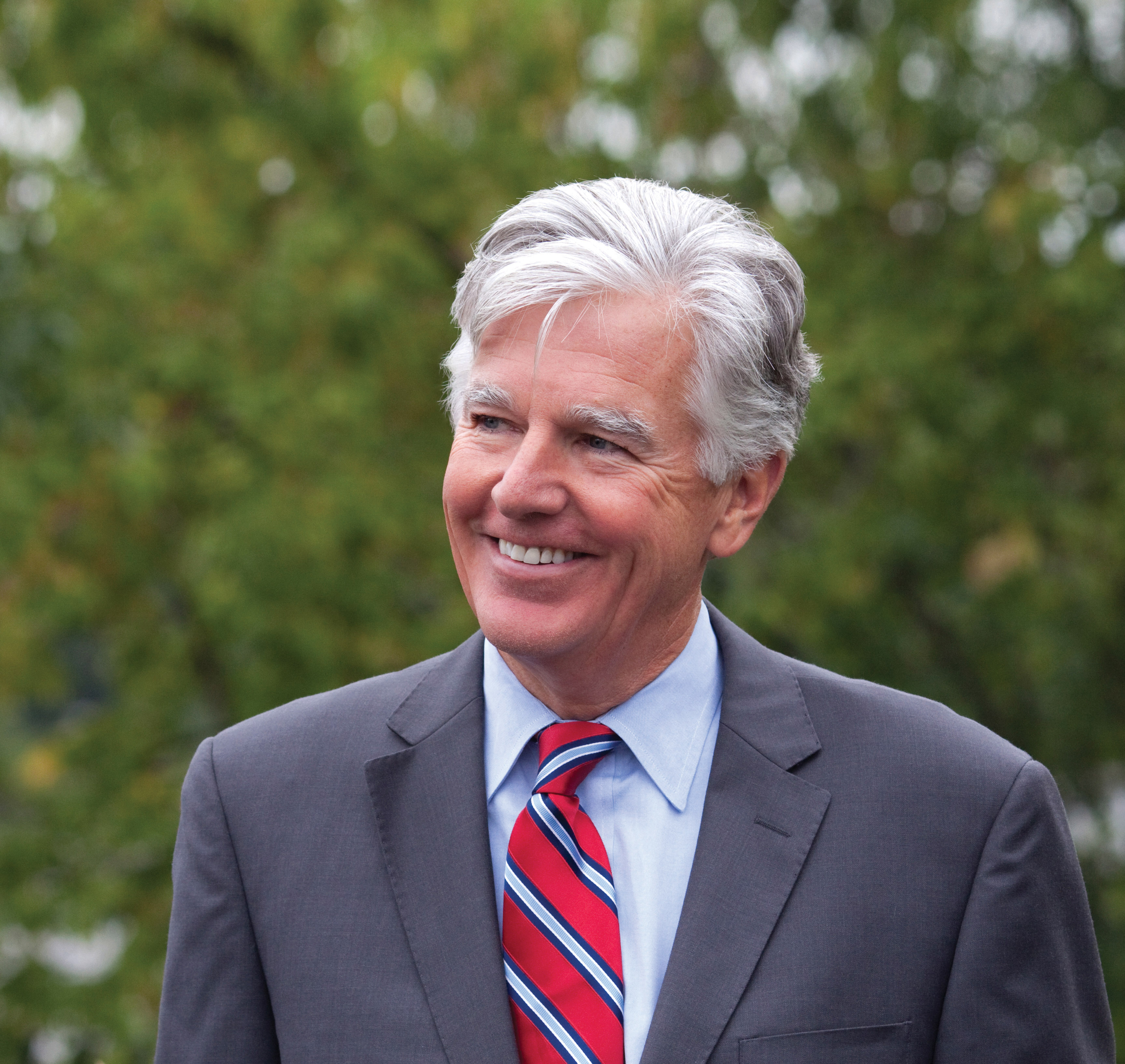
Former congressman, former UMass chancellor and current UMass president Marty Meehan.

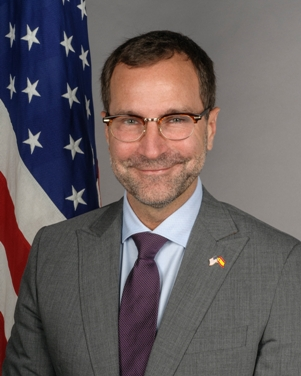
American diplomat and United States Ambassador to Spain and Andorra from 2013 to 2017, James Costos.
