= OpenDocument adoption =

Process of adopting OpenDocument

The following article details governmental and other organizations from around the world who are in the process of evaluating the suitability of using (adopting) OpenDocument, an open document file format for saving and exchanging office documents that may be edited.

== Overview ==
World map of countries, using the OpenDocument standard Officially approved Mandatory standard (NATO)

The OpenDocument format (ODF) was accepted as a standard by OASIS in May 2005, and by ISO in November 2006, as standard ISO/IEC 26300:2006.

Microsoft submitted another format, Office Open XML (aka OOXML), to Ecma International where it was accepted as a standard in December 2006. The Office Open XML specification was published as standard ISO/IEC 29500:2008 in November 2008.

OpenDocument has been officially approved by national standards bodies of Brazil, Croatia, Denmark, Ecuador, Hungary, Italy, Malaysia, Russia, South Korea, South Africa and Sweden.

NATO with its 28 members (Albania, Belgium, Bulgaria, Canada, Croatia, the Czech Republic, Denmark, Estonia, France, Germany, Greece, Hungary, Iceland, Italy, Latvia, Lithuania, Luxembourg, the Netherlands, Norway, Poland, Portugal, Romania, Slovakia, Slovenia, Spain, Turkey, the UK, and the USA) uses ODF as a mandatory standard for all members.

== Africa ==
=== South Africa ===
On October 23, 2007, the Department of Public Service and Administration of the South African government released a report on interoperability standards in government information systems. It specifies ODF as the standard for "working office document formats" (with UTF-8/ASCII text and comma-separated values data as the only alternatives).

Since April 2008, ODF is a national standard too, not only the standard to be used by government departments. South African code for the ODF standard is "SANS 26300:2008/ISO/IEC 26300:2006". By September 2008 all departments will be able to read and write in the Open Document Format. In 2009, ODF will become the default document format for South African government departments.

== Asia ==
=== Hong Kong ===
The Hong Kong government releases an Interoperability Framework every year recommending file formats for various tasks. The framework's 2008 version (v7.0) recommends the use of Microsoft Office '97 or OpenOffice.org v2.0 (based on OpenDocument 1.0) file formats for collaborative editing of text documents, spreadsheets and slideshow presentations.

=== India ===
Chandershekhar, India's secretary of Ministry of Information and Technology, stated that a National ODF alliance would help India play a role in ODF adoption. He characterized ODF as a positive development for e-governance, interoperability, and extending IT access in India.

The Allahabad High Court of India has decided, as policy, to use OpenDocument format for its documents.

==== Assam ====
Government agencies are required to:

- Use ODF
- Transition to open-source operating systems

==== Kerala ====
In 2007 Kerala released an Information Technology Policy designed to turn Kerala into a knowledge society.

They decided that open standards such as ODF would be followed in e-governance projects to avoid proprietary lock in.

=== Japan ===
On June 29, 2007, the government of Japan published a new interoperability framework which gives preference to the procurement of products that follow open standards including the ODF standards. On July 2, the government stated it would also consider alternative document formats, viewing formats like Office Open XML (which had also been approved by organizations like Ecma International and ISO) as an open standard. The government also stated that a format's open status was one of the preferences considered when choosing software for deployment.

Government ministries and agencies are required to:

- Solicit bids from software vendors whose products support internationally recognized open standards

Open formats:

- Are to be preferred, and
- Must be used to promote exchange of information between ministries

Japan's Diet passed an open standards software incentive as part of its omnibus Special Taxation Measures law:

- Provides tax reductions for companies which buy open-standard based software
- Went into effect April 2008 and expires in March 2011.

=== Malaysia ===
In August 2007, The Malaysian government announced plans to adopt open standards and the Open Document Format (ODF) within the country's public sector. The Malaysian Administration Modernization and Management Planning Unit (MAMPU) issued a tender for a nine-month study to evaluate the usage of open standards.

From April 2008 on the use of ODF is mandatory within the public sector.

=== South Korea ===
South Korean government adopted OpenDocument as a part of Korean Industrial Standards KS X ISO/IEC 26300 in 2007, but public documents are still made and distributed in .hwp format. There is no regulation of legislation about OpenDocument since 2007.

=== Taiwan ===
ODF was chosen as an official standard in 2009. Large-scale migrations to ODF and LibreOffice began in 2014.

== Europe ==
The European Commission has, since at least 2003, been investigating various options for storing documents in an XML-based format, commissioning technical studies such as the "Valoris Report". In March 2004, the Telematics between Administrations Committee (TAC) asked an OpenOffice team and a Microsoft team to present on the relative merits of their XML-based office document formats.

In May 2004, TAC issued a set of recommendations, in particular noting that, "Because of its specific role in society, the public sector must avoid [a situation where] a specific product is forced on anyone interacting with it electronically. Conversely, any document format that does not discriminate against market actors and that can be implemented across platforms should be encouraged. Likewise, the public sector should avoid any format that does not safeguard equal opportunities to market actors to implement format-processing applications, especially where this might impose product selection on the side of citizens or businesses. In this respect standardisation initiatives will ensure not only a fair and competitive market but will also help safeguard the interoperability of implementing solutions whilst preserving competition and innovation." It then issued recommendations, including:

- Industry actors not currently involved with the OASIS Open Document Format consider participating in the standardisation process in order to encourage a wider industry consensus around the format;
- Microsoft considers issuing a public commitment to publish and provide non-discriminatory access to future versions of its WordML specifications;
- Microsoft should consider the merits of submitting XML formats to an international standards body of their choice;
- Industry is encouraged to provide filters that allow documents based on the WordML specifications and the emerging OASIS Open Document Format to be read and written to other applications whilst maintaining a maximum degree of faithfulness to content, structure and presentation. These filters should be made available for all products;
- The public sector is encouraged to provide its information through several formats. Where by choice or circumstance only a single revisable document format can be used this should be for a format around which there is industry consensus, as demonstrated by the format's adoption as a standard.

An official recommendation for a certain format was not issued however.

=== Belgium ===
A memorandum on the use of open standards for creating and exchanging office documents was approved by Belgium's federal Council of Ministers on June 23, 2006. OpenDocument was proposed as the standard for exchanging office documents such as texts, spreadsheets, presentations within the federal civil service.

Since September 2007, every federal government department has to be able to accept and read OpenDocument documents.

=== Croatia ===
Government agencies are required to:

- Make each government form posted on a public Web site “accessible in a way that makes it legible in accessible freeware applications”
- Options for meeting this requirement:
  - ODF
  - PDF
  - HTML

=== Denmark ===
The Danish Parliament has decided that ODF must be used by state authorities after April 1, 2011

Until then Government agencies are required to:

- Accept ODF and OOXML “data-processing documents” created by the public, businesses, and other governmental units

Government entities are permitted to:

- Refrain from implementing the new OOXML and ODF standard if doing so would incur “additional costs or inconveniences” or raise “IT security concerns”

=== Finland ===
The Finnish Ministry of Justice decided in December 2006 to migrate to the open source OpenOffice.org office suite and adopt the OpenDocument ISO standard. The migration was scheduled to commence from the beginning of 2007. The decision was based on an office software evaluation in 2005 and an extensive OpenOffice.org pilot project in 2006.

=== France ===
According to French government's RGI (general interoperability framework), ODF is the "recommended format for office documents within French administrations". OOXML is tolerated for "information exchange needs through tables".

Government agencies are required to:

- Accept documents submitted in XML formats: ODF format as like OOxml format (both are in "Observations")
- Use PDF/A to preserve text documents

Government agencies are encouraged to:

- Install OpenOffice.org (an open-source, ODF-based productivity suite)
- Use ODF to create text documents, spreadsheets, and slideshow-style presentations

Government agencies are prohibited from:

- Migrating to any productivity suite formats other than ODF

=== Germany ===
A large number of Bundesländer, state and goverenmental offices and cities widely use products that support ODF (e.g. LibreOffice, OpenOffice.org).

==== Federal ====
In December 2008 the governmental IT-Board of the Bundesregierung decided to make use of the ODF-Format in the Federal administration in order to improve IT-security and interoperability.

The Federal Foreign Office has migrated totally to the use of ODF formats also in the 250 foreign offices abroad (it has reduced its IT costs to a third in comparison to other Ministries). In a message to the participants of the first international ODF-workshop in October 2007 the Federal Foreign Minister stated: "The Open Document Format, as a completely open and ISO standardized format, is an excellent vehicle for the free exchange of knowledge and information in the globalized age."

The Federal office for security in IT (Bundesamt für Sicherheit in der Informationstechnik) uses with StarOffice on all computers the ODF format in a cast deployment.

Since September 2007 all communications with the Federal Court of Justice (Bundesgerichtshof) and the Federal Patent Court (Bundespatentgericht) may be transmitted in the ODF format. The same has already applied for a while to other high courts, i.e. the Bundesarbeitsgericht, the Bundessozialgericht and many other courts in the Bundesland of Nordrhein-Westfalen and of the Free State of Saxony (Sachsen).

Federal agencies will be able to receive, read, send and edit ODF documents beginning no later than 2010.

Under Germany's Standards and Architectures for eGovernment Applications 4.0 (SAGA 4.0), ODF recommended for editable text documents, a multi-stakeholder initiative that recommends and mandates standards to be used by the German federal government.

==== Bundesländer ====
The City of Freiburg in Baden-Württemberg uses OpenOffice.org and OpenDocument.

The City of Munich in Bavaria has already migrated 14000 desktops to OpenOffice.org and OpenDocument while migrating as a whole to Linux.

=== Italy ===
The Italian standardization organization UNI adopted ISO/IEC 26300 (ODF 1.0) on January 26, 2007 (UNI CEI ISO/IEC 26300:2007).

The Italian region of Umbria announced its migration to LibreOffice and OpenDocument format

In 2015, the Italian Ministry of Defence announced that it would standardise on ODF and install LibreOffice on 150,000 PCs.

=== Netherlands ===
From the beginning of 2009 onwards, open source software and the ODF format will be the standard for reading, publishing and the exchange of information for all governmental organisations. Whenever the software used is not open source special reasons have to be given.

=== Norway ===
Norway's Ministry of Government Administration and Reform decided in December 2007 that ODF (ISO/IEC 26300) MUST be used from 2009 when publishing documents that are meant to be changed after downloading, i.e. forms that are to be filled in by the user. So all website forums will use this format.

From 2010 it is mandatory for all government agencies to use document formats (PDF or) ODF when exchanging documents as attachments to e-mail between government and users.

=== Portugal ===
In 2008, the Portuguese Parliament discussed a bill proposed by the PCP) determining that the adoption of open standard formats – namely ODF – shall be mandatory within all public administration agencies.

On 21 June 2011, the government published a law on Open Standards. On 8 November 2012, the list of mandatory standards was published: ODF version 1.1 becomes obligatory in July 2014.

In March 2012, the Câmara Municipal de Vieira do Minho (county of Vieira do Minho) in Portugal announced its migration to LibreOffice.

=== Romania ===
Despite the heated discussions about adopting Free Software and Open Standards in Romanian public administration - especially at eLiberatica 2009 - the Romanian Ministry for Communications and Information Society passed no official bill to enforce the use of Open Standards, particularly OpenDocument. In June 2009, the minister Gabriel Sandu stated in an interview to Ziarul Financiar that "we cannot give up Microsoft licenses overnight", despite the harsh critics from the large national Free Software community and a few important local IT businesses.

The OpenDocument format and OpenDocument-capable software are used by businesses and some Romanian government agencies, mayoralties, courts, notaries, insurance firms, accountants, and engineers. An incomplete list of implementations, including Romania, is maintained here Major OpenOffice.org Deployments - Apache OpenOffice Wiki

=== Russia ===
The Russian standardization organization Federal Agency on Technical Regulating and Metrology adopted ISO/IEC 26300 as national standard GOST R ISO/IEC 26300-2010 (ГОСТ Р ИСО/МЭК 26300-2010) on December 21, 2010.

=== Serbia ===
Government administration is required to:

- Use the ISO 19005 - Electronic document file format for long-term preservation (PDF/A format) for official electronic documents.
- For drafts, proposals and templates one of the following format should be used:
  - ISO 26300 - Open Document Format for Office Applications (OpenDocument) v1.0
  - ISO 29500 - Office Open XML File Formats

If any other specialized file format is used for technical reasons, all parties in the document exchange must agree that there is a technical interoperability for using that file format.

=== Slovakia ===
In Slovakia, all public authorities should be able to read ODF format since August 2006 and can use this format for electronic communication and for publication of documents. Since October 2008, public authorities must be able to read text documents in ODF 1.0 format. Since July 2010, public authorities must be able to read text documents in ODF format up to version 1.2.

Since March 2009, documents in ODF 1.0 format are allowed for use with the electronic signature and qualified electronic signature.

=== Spain ===
==== Andalusia ====
Government agencies are required to:

- Use open standards to interchange documents with citizens, non-governmental organizations, and other government bodies”
  - ODF
  - PDF
  - PDF/A
  - HTML
  - XHTML
  - ASCII
  - UNICODE
  - ASCII (open)
  - RTF (acceptable)

==== Extremadura ====
Government agencies are required to:

- Create and save in ODF (manipulable) or PDF/A (static) format all documents that will be exchanged with other government entities or with citizens.

=== Switzerland ===
Government agencies are required to:

- Use the following formats when exchanging documents with citizens or other agencies:
  - PDF/A (“urgently recommended”)
  - PDF/X (“recommended”)
  - ODF (“recommended”)
  - OOXML (“recommended”)

=== Sweden ===
Sweden has published ODF 1.0 as a national in August 2008. This has not been announced officially. The standards institute only added the prefix "SS" before the ISO number SS-ISO/IEC 26300:2008.

=== Turkey ===
A memorandum on the use of open standards for creating and exchanging office documents is being strongly suggested by Turkish Ministry of Development since 2008. According to "Interoperability Report" Turkish Ministry of Development, government agencies are required to:

- Create and save in ODF or PDF format all documents that will be exchanged with other government entities or with citizens.

=== United Kingdom ===
Under the “Open Source, Open Standards and Re–Use: Government Action Plan” the UK government will specify requirements by reference to open standards and require compliance with open standards in solutions where feasible. The government indicated it will support the use of ODF 1.0 (ISO/IEC 26300:2006).

BECTA (British Education Communication Technology Agency) is the UK agency in charge of defining information technology (IT) policy for all schools in the United Kingdom, including standards for all the schools' infrastructure. In 2005 they published a comprehensive document describing the policy for infrastructure in schools.

This document highly recommends the use of OpenDocument and a few other formats for office document data. BECTA explains this as follows: "Any office application used by institutions must be able to be saved to (and so viewed by others) using a commonly agreed format that ensures an institution is not locked into using specific software. The main aim is for all office based applications to provide functionality to meet the specifications described here (whether licensed software, open source or unlicensed freeware) and thus many application providers could supply the educational institution ICT market.".

In July 2014, the UK Government formally adopted the use of OpenDocument for document exchange.

==== Bristol City Council ====
Bristol City Council is no longer using OpenDocument software. It adopted the StarOffice suite in 2005 and with it the OpenDocument format across 5500 desktop computers. It swapped back to using Microsoft Office about 4 years later.

== South America ==
=== Argentina ===
In September 2007 the Argentinian province of Misiones decided via governmental decree that the use of the ODF format shall be mandatory within administrative organizations related to the government.

=== Brazil ===
With the publication of "e-Ping Interoperability Framework", Brazil became the first South American country to officially recommend the adoption of OpenDocuments within the government.

As stated in version v3.0 of 2007: "Preferred adoption of Open Formats: e-PING defines that, whenever possible, open standards will be used in technical specifications. "Proprietary standards" will be accepted, in this transition period, with the perspective of replacement as soon as there are conditions for a complete migration. With no loss to these goals, are to be respected those situations when there is the need to consider security requisites and information integrity. When available, Free Software solutions are to be considered preferential, accordingly with the policy defined by the Comitê Executivo de Governo Eletrônico (CEGE)"

Since April 2008 ODF is a national standard in Brazil, coded as NBRISO/IEC26300.

As of the 2010 version, the transition period has officially ended, and proprietary document formats may no longer be used in the federal public administration, although in practice this is not the case in many federal agencies and departments.

Additionally, a number of parties, including local governments, companies and non-governmental organizations have signed into the Brasília Protocol, which formalize intentions and set goals for adopting the use of the Open Document standard.

==== Paraná ====
Government agencies and state-owned companies are required to:

- Use ODF for the creation, storage, and display of all electronic documents

=== Uruguay ===
Since June 2008 the "Agency for the Development of Government Electronic Management and Information and Knowledge Society of Uruguay" recommends that public documents use either ODF or PDF. ODF should be used for documents in the process of being edited and the latter for documents in final form.

=== Venezuela ===
All organizations of the Federal Government of Venezuela must:

- Use ODF 1.0 (ISO/IEC 26300) for editable documents
- Use PDF for non-editable documents

== North America ==
=== Canada ===
Canadian governments do not have mandatory file formats. Microsoft office products are widely used by all levels of governments in Canada.

=== United States ===
==== Massachusetts ====
The U.S. state of Massachusetts has been examining its options for implementing XML-based document processing. In early 2005, Eric Kriss, Secretary of Administration and Finance in Massachusetts, was the first government official in the United States to publicly connect open formats to a public policy purpose: "It is an overriding imperative of the American democratic system that we cannot have our public documents locked up in some kind of proprietary format, perhaps unreadable in the future, or subject to a proprietary system license that restricts access."

At a September 16, 2005 meeting with the Mass Technology Leadership Council, Kriss stated that he believes this is fundamentally an issue of sovereignty. While supporting the principle of private intellectual property rights, he said sovereignty trumped any private company's attempt to control the state's public records through claims of intellectual property.

Subsequently, in September 2005, Massachusetts became the first state to formally endorse OpenDocument formats for its public records and, at the same time, reject Microsoft's new XML format, now standardized as ISO/IEC 29500:2008 — Office Open XML. This decision was made after a two-year examination of file formats, including many discussions with Microsoft, other vendors, and various experts, plus some limited trial programs in individual communities like Saugus and Billerica. Microsoft Office, which had a high market share among the state's employees, did not support OpenDocument formats until Service Pack 2 of Office 2007. Microsoft had indicated that OpenDocument formats would not be supported in new versions of Office, although they supported other formats (including ASCII, RTF, and WordPerfect). Some analysts believed it would be easy for Microsoft to implement the standard. If Microsoft chooses not to implement OpenDocument, Microsoft will disqualify themselves from future consideration. Several analysts (such as Ovum) predicted that Microsoft would eventually support OpenDocument. On 6 July 2006 Microsoft announced that they would support the OpenDocument format and create a plugin to allow Office to save to ODF.

After this announcement by Massachusetts supporting OpenDocument, a large number of people and organizations spoke up about the policy, both pro and con (see the references section). Adobe, Corel, IBM, and Sun all sent letters to Massachusetts supporting the measure. In contrast, Microsoft sent in a letter highly critical of the measure. A group named "Citizens Against Government Waste" (CAGW) also opposed the decision. The group claimed that Massachusetts' policy established "an arbitrary preference for open source," though both open source software and proprietary software can implement the specification, and both kinds of developers were involved in creating the standard (CAGW, 2005). However, InternetNews and Linux Weekly News noted that CAGW has received funding from Microsoft, and that in 2001 CAGW was caught running an astroturfing campaign on behalf of Microsoft when two letters they submitted supporting Microsoft in Microsoft's anti-trust case were found to have the signatures of deceased persons (Linux Weekly News). James Prendergast, executive director of a coalition named "Americans for Technology Leadership" (ATL), also criticized the state's decision in a Fox News article. In the article, Prendergast failed to disclose that Microsoft is a founding member of ATL. Fox News later published a follow-up article disclosing that fact.

State Senator Marc R. Pacheco and State Secretary William F. Galvin have expressed reservations about this plan. Pacheco held a hearing on October 31, 2005, on the topic of OpenDocument. Pacheco did not want OpenDocument to be declared as the executive branch standard, primarily on procedural grounds. Pacheco believed that the executive branch had to receive permission to set an executive standard from the multi-branch IT Advisory Board. In contrast, The Massachusetts Information Technology Division (ITD), and its general council, believe the Advisory board's role is to advise ITD, and ITD did discuss the issue with the IT Advisory Board, but ITD's Peter J. Quinn and Linda Hamel (ITD's General Counsel) asserted that there is no requirement that "ITD approach the Advisory Board for permission to adopt policies that will impact only the Executive Department." Hamel later filed a legal briefing justifying ITD's position (Hamel, 2005). Massachusetts' Supreme Court has ruled that the various branches of government are prohibited from mandating IT standards on each other; this ruling appears to support ITD's claim. Pacheco also did not like the process used to select OpenDocument. However, Pacheco appears to have had many fundamental misunderstandings of the issues. Andy Updegrove said that at the time, "Senator Pacheco doesn't understand the difference between open source and open standards (and certainly doesn't understand the difference between OpenDocument and OpenOffice). More than once, he indicated that he thought that the policy would require the Executive Agencies to use OpenOffice.org, not realizing that there are other compliant alternatives. He also thought that this would act to the detriment of Massachusetts software vendors, who (he thinks) would be excluded from doing business with the Commonwealth." Pacheco also thought that OpenOffice.org was under the GPL, but in fact it is released under the LGPL (Jones, October 31, 2005) (Jones, November 14, 2005). He attempted to halt implementation of OpenDocument in the executive branch via an amendment (to S. 2256), but the amended bill was never sent to the governor.

Since then in 2007 Massachusetts has amended its approved technical standards list to include Office Open XML.

===== References =====
Official Information Documents from the Commonwealth of Massachusetts:

- (RTF) Enterprise Open Standards Policy (ETRM) Version 4.0
- (RTF) Enterprise Technical Reference Model (ETRM) Version 4.0, effective July 2007.

(to find the documents as HTML pages, go to http://www.mass.gov and search for the documents, e.g. "etrm")

==== Other states and organizations in the US ====
In November 2005, James Gallt, associate director for the National Association of State Chief Information Officers, said that a number of other state agencies are also exploring the use of OpenDocument (LaMonica, November 10, 2005).

In April 2006, a bill was introduced in the Minnesota state legislature to require all state agencies to use open data formats. It is expected that the OpenDocument Format will be advanced as a way of meeting the proposed requirement. (Gardner, April 7, 2006).

In late 2007 and early 2008, New York State issued a Request for Public Comment concerning electronic records policy.

===== References =====
- Gardner, W. David (April 7, 2006). "Minnesota Considers Mandatory Use Of ODF: It's another state battle that pits Microsoft's proprietary Office software on one side against supporters of the OpenDocument Format on the other". InformationWeek.
- LaMonica, Martin (November 10, 2005). OpenDocument format gathers steam CNET News.com, published on ZDNet News.

== Other regions ==
=== Australia ===
It was announced on 31 March 2006, that the National Archives of Australia had settled on OpenDocument as their choice for a cross-platform/application document format.

=== Other ===
According to OASIS' OpenDocument datasheet, "Singapore's Ministry of Defence, France's Ministry of Finance and its Ministry of Economy, Finance, and Industry, Brazil's Ministry of Health, the City of Munich, Germany, UK's Bristol City Council, and the City of Vienna in Austria are all adopting applications that support OpenDocument." (OASIS, 2005b).

== See also ==
- History of free and open-source software
- Linux adoption
