= Andrew Natsios =

American politician (born 1949)

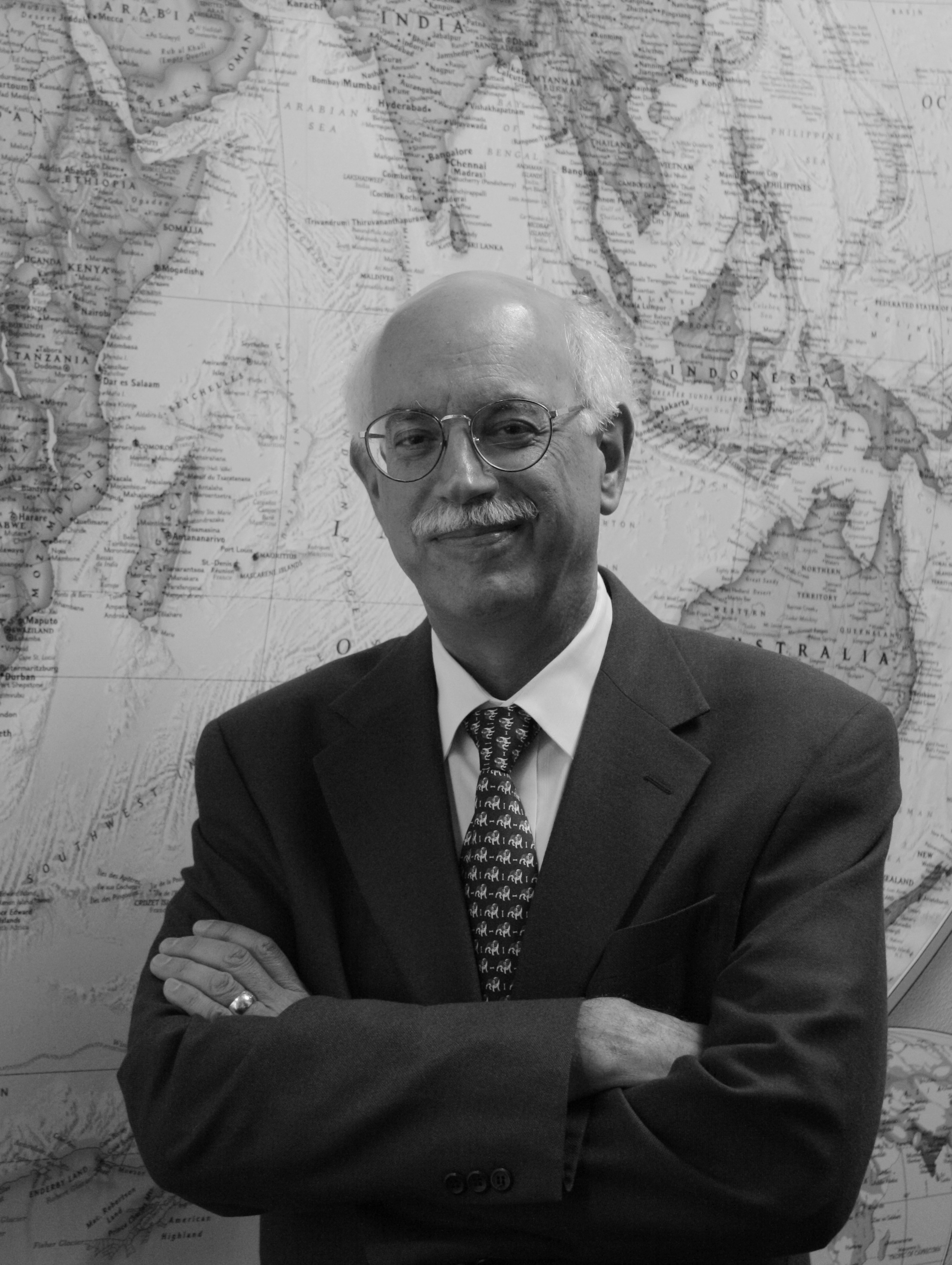
- Natsios in 2012

13th Administrator of the United States Agency for International Development
- In office May 1, 2001 – January 14, 2006
- President: George W. Bush
- Preceded by: J. Brady Anderson
- Succeeded by: Randall L. Tobias

Chair of the Massachusetts Turnpike Authority
- In office April 2000 – March 2001
- Governor: Paul Cellucci
- Preceded by: James Kerasiotes
- Succeeded by: David Forsberg

Secretary of Administration and Finance of Massachusetts
- In office March 1999 – April 2000
- Governor: Paul Cellucci
- Preceded by: Frederick Laskey
- Succeeded by: Stephen Crosby

Assistant Administrator of the United States Agency for International Development for Food and Humanitarian Assistance
- In office 1991 – January 1993
- President: George H. W. Bush
- Preceded by: Philip Lawrence
- Succeeded by: Douglas Stafford

Chair of the Massachusetts Republican Party
- In office 1980–1987
- Preceded by: Gordon M. Nelson
- Succeeded by: Ray Shamie

Member of the Massachusetts House of Representatives
- In office 1979–1987
- Preceded by: Constituency established
- Succeeded by: Barbara Gardner
- Constituency: 58th Middlesex (1975–1979); 8th Middlesex (1979–1987)

Personal details
- Born: September 22, 1949 (age 77) Philadelphia, Pennsylvania, U.S.
- Party: Republican
- Spouse: Elizabeth Natsios
- Children: 3
- Education: Georgetown University (BA); Harvard University (MPA)

Andrew S. Natsios (born September 22, 1949) is an American public servant and Republican politician originally from Massachusetts, who served in a number of positions in the administrations of Governor Paul Cellucci and President George W. Bush.

After serving as a Massachusetts state representative and chairman of the Massachusetts Republican Party, Natsios served as secretary of administration and finance and chairman of the Massachusetts Turnpike Authority in the Cellucci administration. Then, Natsios served under George W. Bush as administrator of the United States Agency for International Development (USAID) and special envoy to Sudan. Natsios also served as vice president of the evangelical Christian humanitarian organization World Vision U.S. He currently teaches as executive professor at the Bush School of Government and Public Service at Texas A&M University, where he served as director for the Scowcroft Institute of International Affairs from 2012 to 2025.

== Education ==
Natsios was born in Philadelphia to Basil and Eta Natsios, Americans of Greek descent. He received his BA in history from Georgetown University in 1971 and his MPP from the Harvard Kennedy School at Harvard University in 1979.

== Career ==
=== Twentieth century ===
Natsios served in the Massachusetts House of Representatives from 1975 to 1987, focusing on public finance and municipal government. During this time, he co-authored Proposition 2½ (a property tax cutting law) and State Zoning Law Chapter 808. He was also chairman of the Town of Holliston By-Law Study Committee and Treasurer for the Industrial Development Commission. In 1986, Natsios introduced legislation to repeal the Massachusetts Teachers' Oath, a product of the 1930s that remained state law even after the Massachusetts Supreme Judicial Court invalidated the law in 1967. The legislation passed without opposition. He was named Legislator of the Year by the Massachusetts Municipal Association in 1978, and by the Massachusetts Association of School Committees and Citizen for Limited Taxation in 1986.

Natsios was also the Chairman of the Massachusetts Republican State Committee for seven years. He directed the rebuilding of the party's institutional capacity, and implemented a strategy of focusing on races for the state legislature. The state party's income increased significantly during this period, as did the services they offered to candidates, and the number of Republicans in the legislative delegation increased by 17%.

A 23-year veteran of the United States Army Reserve, Natsios was commissioned second lieutenant at Georgetown University (ROTC) in 1971. He was a civil affairs officer and served in the Gulf War in Riyadh, Saudi Arabia, Kuwait City, and on the Joint Staff of the Pentagon in 1993, where he worked on Somalia and Bosnia. He retired in 1995 with the rank of lieutenant colonel.

He directed the Office of Foreign Disaster Assistance at the U.S. Agency for International Development from 1989 to 1991 during the George H.W Bush administration. Additionally, he served as assistant administrator for the Bureau for Food and Humanitarian Assistance, which is now the Bureau of Democracy, Conflict and Humanitarian Assistance, from 1991 to January 1993.

Under Natsios, OFDA focused its attention on civil wars and famines, which research had found were responsible for more than twice the number of deaths than from natural disasters. The first Disaster Assistance Response Teams (DART) were developed under Natsios's predecessor, Julia Taft, but were first deployed under Natsios' orders. The first version of the Field Operations Guide For Disaster Assessment and Response (FOG) was issued under his auspices.

Natsios was assistance administrator during the 1991–1992 Somali famine and played a major role in humanitarian aid in response to it. USAID's relief strategy consisted of several key elements: sale of food to Somali merchants to lower food prices; providing free food at feeding stations in urban areas; providing free dry food in bulk in rural areas; enhancing security; decentralization and distributing food in a number of different areas to stop mass population movements.

From 1993 to 1998, Natsios served as vice president of international programs for World Vision.

Natsios was one of the first people to blow the whistle on the North Korean famine, writing in a Washington Post op-ed in early 1997, "The evidence is incontestible." He travelled to North Korea in June 1997 with World Vision, and was involved in relief efforts as the leader of the Emergency Relief Committee of InterAction, a consortium of American NGOs. Natsios later published a book on the crisis entitled The Great North Korean Famine.

From March 1999 to April 2000, he served as secretary for administration and finance for the Commonwealth of Massachusetts. In 2001, Natsios took over as chairman and CEO of the Massachusetts Turnpike Authority and CEO of Boston's Central Artery Project (the Big Dig) after a cost overrun scandal. Once in command, he replaced eight senior figures, including the project manager, commissioned a new audit, and developed strategies to tackle the cost overruns, including putting the $151 million from land sales to Harvard University towards paying for future unexpected costs. He also contributed to the designs for surface restoration for once the project was completed.

=== Twenty-first century ===
In May 2001, Natsios was sworn in as the administrator of the United States Agency for International Development (USAID). While serving as administrator, he also served as special humanitarian assistance coordinator for Sudan and coordinator for international disaster assistance.

Natsios articulated his approach to foreign aid in an article he wrote during his time as administrator, entitled "The Nine Principles of Reconstruction and Development." These principles, he wrote, "distill fundamental lessons" and "bring greater clarity to the operative principles that inform the mission of USAID." The nine principles are ownership (build on local leadership and commitment); capacity building (strengthen local institutions and transfer technical skills); sustainability; selectivity (allocate resources based on need, local commitment, and foreign policy interests); assessment (conduct research and adapt best practices for local conditions); results (have clearly defined, measurable, and strategically focused objectives); partnership; flexibility; and accountability.

Early in his term as administrator, Natsios set up the Office of Conflict Mitigation and Management, and directed that conflict provisions be added to country strategies. This was crucial, given that sixty percent of the countries with USAID mission had been involved in civil wars or major conflicts in the preceding five years. In addition, Natsios led the creation of USAID's Fragile State Strategy, which, as he stated in its introduction, directed USAID "to focus our efforts on those countries where will be able to have the greatest impact."

The Office of Military Affairs, now the Office of Office of Civilian-Military Cooperation, was also created during his term as administrator, to serve as the primary point of contact with the Department of Defense and allow for personnel exchange and policy development.

Natsios also worked to advance USAID's commitment to inclusive development by passing a policy directive that mandated that requests for funding explain how they will instead work to ensure that people with disabilities are included and not discriminated against. Another policy directive also required that all USAID-funded new construction and major renovations be accessible for people with disabilities. A Disability Coordinator position and an External Advisory Committee were also both created during his term.

Under Natsios, the agency initiated a relief program in Darfur in September 2003, nearly half a year before any action began at the UN. Sam Brownback, then Senator from Kansas, credits Natsios as the person "who hit the button on Darfur." In order to show the scale of the Janjawiid militia damage, Natsios ordered before and after satellite photos taken of villages in Darfur. He also commissioned a report on the expected death rates in Darfur, should the humanitarian response be insufficient or delayed. His warnings led to President Bush's use of political pressure on to Sudanese leader to try to stop the violence, as well as billions of dollars of aid being sent to Sudan.

His position on funding for antiretrovirals in Sub-Saharan Africa remains an enduring part of his career at USAID and was emblematic of the position of the US government of the time. In a statement prepared for the House Foreign Affairs Committee in June 2001, he responded to a proposal for an increase in antiretroviral funding as suggested by UN Secretary General Kofi Annan:

If we had [antiretrovirals] today we could not distribute them. We could not administer the program because we do not have the doctors, we do not have the roads, we do not have the cold chain. This sounds small and some people, if you have traveled to rural Africa you know this, this is not a criticism, just a different world. People do not know what watches and clocks are. They do not use Western means for telling time.

In an interview with the Fletcher Forum of World Affairs in 2003, he discussed how his thinking had changed, partly due to the impact of public pressure. "We are trying [a retroviral program in Ghana], and if it works, we are going to extend it. Anything we can do to reduce the spread of the disease, and keep people alive, we are going to do.

As administrator, Natsios oversaw the creation and implementation of the first Global Development Alliances (GDAs)—partnerships between USAID and the private sector. In the first fifteen years of operation, more than 1,500 GDAs—involving over 3,500 partner organizations and valued at more than $20 billion – were created. Natsios also helped launch major presidential initiatives, including PEPFAR and the President's Malaria Initiative (PMI).

After visiting a project site of a USAID designed and funded program, but seeing no mention of USAID, Natsios reported that he was motivated to start a branding campaign, and ensure that credit was being appropriately given. The USAID logo was put on USAID-funded projects, and a media campaign was also implemented, increasing America's approval rating in foreign countries. Natsios also oversaw the redesign of the USAID logo, which was updated to include the tagline "From the American People" so as to emphasize the contributions of the American taxpayer.

Natsios advocated for changes to the United States' food aid system that would allow food to be purchased locally. This would be cheaper—and faster—than shipping in American-grown grain. Speaking at a food aid conference in Kansas City in 2005, he said "The fact that U.S. farmers and shippers are able to benefit from Food for Peace program is an important but secondary benefit. The primary objective is to save lives." Pressures from agricultural groups, shipping companies and humanitarian groups involved in distributing food aid prevented the reforms from passing.

He resigned from USAID on January 14, 2006. Shortly after, President Bush appointed him special envoy for Darfur. As special envoy, Natsios played a key role in managing relations between the United States and Sudan, including about implementing the North/South Comprehensive Peace Agreement, and helping humanitarian aid reach those in need. He retired as special envoy in 2007 when Rich Williamson was appointed as the new special envoy to Sudan.

In an April 2003 interview with Ted Koppel, Natsios suggested that the total cost of rebuilding Iraq would not exceed $1.7 billion to U.S. taxpayers. Actual figures have proven to be considerably higher.

From 2006 to 2012, Natsios taught as a Distinguished Professor in the Practice of Diplomacy and served as an Advisor on International Development at Georgetown University's Walsh School of Foreign Service.

Natsios teaches courses on international development and famine theory at Texas A&M's George H. W. Bush School of Government and Public Service where he served as the director of the Scowcroft Institute of International Affairs from 2012 to 2025.

Natsios was a Jennings Randolph Senior Fellow at the United States Institute of Peace from 1998 to 1999 and a Senior Fellow at the Hudson Institute from 2008 to 2018.

== Boards ==
Natsios is a board member of the American Academy of Diplomacy and an archon of the Ecumenical Patriarchate of the Eastern Orthodox Church, Order of St. Andrew. He is also the emeritus co-chairman for the Committee for Human Rights in North Korea, which is a research center on human rights.

== Publications ==
Andrew Natsios has authored numerous articles on foreign policy and humanitarian emergencies, as well as books: Sudan, South Sudan, and Darfur: What Everyone Needs to Know (Oxford University Press, 2012), The Great North Korean Famine (U.S. Institute for Peace, 2001), and U.S. Foreign Policy and the Four Horsemen of the Apocalypse (Center for Strategic and International Studies, 1997). He is also the co-editor, along with former White House chief of staff Andrew Card, of a book entitled Transforming Our World: President George H.W Bush and American Foreign Policy.

Natsios has also contributed to thirteen books, written over 40 articles for publications such as Foreign Affairs, The Wall Street Journal, The Washington Post, and the Washington Quarterly. Natsios was also featured in the US Army War College's quarterly publication, Parameters, in 2005, with his article "The Nine Principles of Reconstruction and Development".

== Bibliography ==
- U.S. Foreign Policy and the Four Horsemen of the Apocalypse: Humanitarian Relief in Complex Emergencies (The Washington Papers) (Praeger, 1997) ISBN 9780274662845
- The Great North Korean Famine (United States Institute of Peace Press, 2002) ISBN 9781929223336
  - 北朝鮮飢餓の真実―なぜこの世に地獄が現れたのか? ISBN 9784594038151
- Sudan, South Sudan, and Darfur: What Everyone Needs to Know (Oxford University Press, 2012) ISBN 9780199764198
- Transforming Our World: President George H.W Bush and American Foreign Policy (Rowman & Littlefield Publishers, 2021) ISBN 9781538143445
- Russia under Putin: Fragile State and Revisionist Power (Johns Hopkins University Press, 2025) ISBN 9781421451923

== Personal life ==
A native of Holliston, Massachusetts, Natsios and his wife, Elizabeth, have three children and two grandchildren. He and his wife reside in College Station, Texas.

He is a practicing Antiochian Orthodox Christian.

Party political offices
Preceded by Gordon M. Nelson	Chair of the Massachusetts Republican Party; 1980–1987	Succeeded by Ray Shamie
Political offices
Preceded by J. Brady Anderson	Administrator of the United States Agency for International Development; 2001–2006	Succeeded by Randall L. Tobias
