= Homer Loring =

American industrialist

- Born: October , 1875; Newton Center, Massachusetts, United States
- Died: June 20, 1939 (aged 63); New York City
- Occupation: Industrialist
- Known for: Former chairman of the Boston & Maine Railroad
- Spouse: Mary (Bennett) Loring
- Children: 1

Homer Loring (1875-1939) was an American industrialist who served as chairman of the Boston & Maine Railroad from 1924 to 1928. He was known for reorganizing large industries.

== Early life ==
Loring was born in October 1875 in Newton Center, Massachusetts. He attended Newton public schools. Loring began his business career with his father's brokerage firm.

== Railroads ==
Loring served as president of the Macon, Dublin & Savannah Railroad, chairman of the Eastern Massachusetts Street Railway, and receiver of the Des Moines, Fort Dodge & Southern Railroad. He also worked for the Saginaw Traction Company and organized the Nevada Consolidated Copper Company.

=== Boston & Maine ===
On April 9, 1924, Loring was elected as a director of the Boston & Maine Railroad. On August 19, 1924, Loring was elected chairman of the B&M executive committee. During his tenure as chairman, the B&M built new freight classification yards, improved buildings, roadbeds, and bridges, installed new equipment, consolidated personnel, discontinued or transferred 300 miles of unremunerative lines, enlarged the Hoosac Tunnel, and developed a new North Station complex, which included a new train station, the Boston Garden, Hotel Manger, North Station Industrial Building, and a distributing terminal. Loring's financial reorganization brought $13 million of new funds to the railroad and extended the maturity of $40 million worth of bonds by fifteen years. He also installed George Hannauer as president and brought on John Frank Stevens as an advisor. Loring resigned as chairman on September 24, 1928.

== Administration and Finance ==
In December 1922, Governor Channing H. Cox nominated Loring to serve on the newly created State Commission on Administration and Finance. Loring was the commission's chairman as well as the budget commissioner. He resigned in September 1924 to fully devote his time to his duties as B&M chairman.

== Textiles ==
In October 1928, Loring and associates bought into the Seneca Textile Corporation of New York. On October 9, 1928, Loring announced the formation of the United Merchants and Manufacturers, Inc. Loring served a president of the new company. In January 1929, Loring purchased the Arkwright Mills in Fall River, Massachusetts.

== Personal life ==
Loring was married to Mary (Bennett) Loring. The couple had one daughter. In 1908, Loring purchased Maple Ridge Farm in Ashland, Massachusetts, for use as a summer place. On January 25, 1925, the mansion house was destroyed by a suspected arson fire. All of the mansion's valuables were destroyed. In 1936, Loring began residing in a room at The Union League Club in New York City.

Loring died on June 20, 1939, in his room at The Union League Club. He was buried in the Lakeview Cemetery in Holliston, Massachusetts.

Government offices
Preceded by Position created	Chairman of the Massachusetts Commission of Administration and Finance; 1922–1924	Succeeded by Thomas W. White
Business positions
Preceded by James Humphrey Hustis, Sr. (acting)	Chairman of the Boston and Maine Railroad Executive Committee; 1924–1928	Succeeded by Thomas Nelson Perkins
