= Secretary of Administration and Finance of Massachusetts =

Government position

Massachusetts Secretary of Administration and Finance
- Incumbent; Matthew Gorzkowicz since January 5, 2023
- Executive Office of Administration and Finance
- Style: Mr. Secretary (informal); The Honorable (formal)
- Member of: Massachusetts Cabinet
- Reports to: Governor of Massachusetts
- Appointer: Governor of Massachusetts
- Term length: No fixed term
- Website: www.mass.gov/info-details/governors-cabinet

The secretary of administration and finance of Massachusetts is the head of the Executive Office of Administration and Finance, and serves as an advisor to the governor of Massachusetts. Its current secretary is Matthew Gorzkowicz, who has been serving since January 5, 2023.

== History ==
In 1922, the Massachusetts General Court passed legislation creating the department of administration and finance. The department replaced the office of supervisor of administration and assumed many of the duties of the superintendent of buildings, secretary of the Commonwealth, state treasurer, and state auditor. On December 13, 1922, Governor Channing H. Cox nominated four men to the newly created commission of administration and finance. They were:

- Homer Loring, chairman and budget commissioner
- Thomas W. White, commissioner of personnel and standardization
- James C. McCormick, controller
- Robert L. Whipple, purchasing agent

In 1928, due to the commission's increased workload, Governor Alvan T. Fuller chose to separate the positions of chairman and budget commissioner.

The department was reorganized in 1948 and the four-person commission was replaced by a single commissioner. Thomas H. Buckley, the final chairman of the commission, was the state's first commissioner of administration and finance.

In 1969, the state legislature passed a bill introduced by Governor John A. Volpe and backed by his successor, Francis Sargent, that reorganized the state government under a cabinet-style system. The bill, which went into effect in 1971, reorganized the state government into 10 executive offices led by secretaries who served at the pleasure of the governor. The Executive Office of Administration and Finance combined the existing administration and finance operation with the department of corporations and taxation. It was described by David Nyhan as "the most powerful of the cabinet appointments" due to its "powerful budgetary control over other secretariats". Sargent appointed sitting commissioner of administration and finance Charles E. Shepard to be the first secretary of administration and finance.

== Duties ==
The secretary is in charge of formulating the governor’s budget plan, providing guidance on the economy, and implementing the state government’s revenue and budgets. The secretary also manages numerous state administrative agencies.

=== Managing agencies ===
- Department of Revenue
- Human Resources Division
- Group Insurance Commission
- Operational Services Division
- Department of Capital Asset Management and Maintenance
- Civil Service Commission
- Public Employee Retirement Administration Commission
- Teacher's Retirement Board
- Health Policy Commission
- Developmental Disabilities Council
- Division of Capital Asset Management

== Leadership ==
=== Commission of Administration and Finance members ===
Chairman

- Homer Loring (1922–1924)
- Thomas W. White (1924–1925)
- Charles P. Howard (1925–1937)
- Patrick J. Moynihan (1937–1941)
- Angier Goodwin (1941–1942)
- Paul W. Foster (1942–1945)
- Thomas H. Buckley (1945–1948)

Budget commissioner

- Homer Loring (1922–1924)
- Thomas W. White (1924–1925)
- Charles P. Howard (1925–1928)
- Carl A. Raymond (1928–1940)
- Charles W. Greenough (1940–1947)
- William H. Bixby (1947–1948)

Controller

- James C. McCormick (1922–1928)
- Walter S. Morgan (1928–1932)
- George E. Murphy (1932–1940)
- Walter S. Morgan (1940–1945)
- Francis X. Lang (1945–1948)

Commissioner of Personnel and standardization

- Thomas W. White (1922–1924)
- Frank H. Putnam (1924–1934)
- William H. Doyle (1934–1945)

Purchasing agent

- Robert L. Whipple (1922–1925)
- George J. Cronin (1925–1948)

=== Commissioners of administration and finance ===
Secretary	Term	Governor
Thomas H. Buckley	1948–1953	Robert F. Bradford; Paul A. Dever
Carl A. Sheridan	1953–1956	Christian Herter
Francis X. Lang	1957–1958	Foster Furcolo
Charles F. Mahoney	1958–1960	Foster Furcolo
Charles Gibbons	1961–1963	John A. Volpe
William Waldron	1963–1965	Endicott Peabody
John J. McCarthy	1965–1967	John A. Volpe
Anthony P. DeFalco	1967–1969	John A. Volpe
Donald Dwight	1969–1970	Francis Sargent
Charles E. Shepard	1970–1971	Francis Sargent

=== Secretaries of administration and finance ===
Picture	Secretary	Term	Governor
	Charles E. Shepard	June 22, 1971–September 27, 1971	Francis Sargent
	Robert Yasi	September 27, 1971–November 14, 1972	Francis Sargent
	William I. Cowin	November 14, 1972–May 9, 1974	Francis Sargent
	David M. Marchand	May 9, 1974–January 2, 1975	Francis Sargent
	John R. Buckley	January 2, 1975–January 4, 1979	Michael Dukakis
	Edward Hanley	January 4, 1979–January 27, 1982	Edward J. King
	David M. Bartley	January 27, 1982–January 6, 1983	Edward J. King
	Frank T. Keefe	January 6, 1983–December 30, 1988	Michael Dukakis
	L. Edward Lashman	December 30, 1988–January 3, 1991	Michael Dukakis
	Peter Nessen	January 3, 1991–March 1, 1993	Bill Weld
	Mark E. Robinson	March 1, 1993–November 1994	Bill Weld
	Charlie Baker	November 1994–September 1, 1998	Bill Weld; Paul Cellucci
	Frederick Laskey	September 1, 1998–March 1, 1999	Paul Cellucci
	Andrew Natsios	March 1, 1999–April 2000	Paul Cellucci
	Stephen P. Crosby	May 2000–January 2002	Paul Cellucci; Jane Swift
	Kevin J. Sullivan	February 2002–January 2, 2003	Jane Swift
	Eric Kriss	January 2, 2003–September 30, 2005	Mitt Romney
	Thomas Trimarco	October 1, 2005–January 4, 2007	Mitt Romney
	Leslie Kirwan	January 4, 2007–October 12, 2009	Deval Patrick
	Jay Gonzalez	October 12, 2009–January 7, 2013	Deval Patrick
	Glen Shor	January 7, 2013–January 8, 2015	Deval Patrick
	Kristen Lepore	January 8, 2015–July 19, 2017	Charlie Baker
	Michael J. Heffernan	July 19, 2017–January 5, 2023	Charlie Baker
	Matthew Gorzkowicz	January 5, 2023–present	Maura Healey
