= Mark E. Robinson =

American attorney

Mark Robinson

Secretary of Administration and Finance of Massachusetts
- In office March 1993 – November 1994
- Preceded by: Peter Nessen
- Succeeded by: Charlie Baker

Personal details
- Education: Duke University (AB); Boston University (JD)

Mark E. Robinson is an American attorney and former Massachusetts government official who served as Secretary of Administration and Finance of Massachusetts from 1992 to 1994.

== Early life ==
Robinson grew up in Maryland. He earned a bachelor's degree from Duke University and a Juris Doctor from the Boston University School of Law.

== Career ==
After graduating, Robinson went to work for the firm of Herrick & Smith. In 1982 he became an assistant United States attorney under Bill Weld. He secured the convictions of the eight men responsible for the 1982 Boston arson spree. When Weld was appointed United States Assistant Attorney General he chose Robinson to serve as his chief of staff. In 1988, Weld and Robinson resigned in protest of an ethics scandal and associated investigations into Attorney General Edwin Meese. The pair, along with Jane Serene, joined Hale and Dorr. When Weld was elected Governor of Massachusetts in 1990 he chose Robinson to serve as his chief of staff. In 1993, Robinson was appointed Secretary of Administration and Finance of Massachusetts. He left the Weld administration in 1994 to work for Bingham Dana & Gould. In 2015 he joined Mintz Levin.
