= Charlie Baker =

American politician (born 1956)

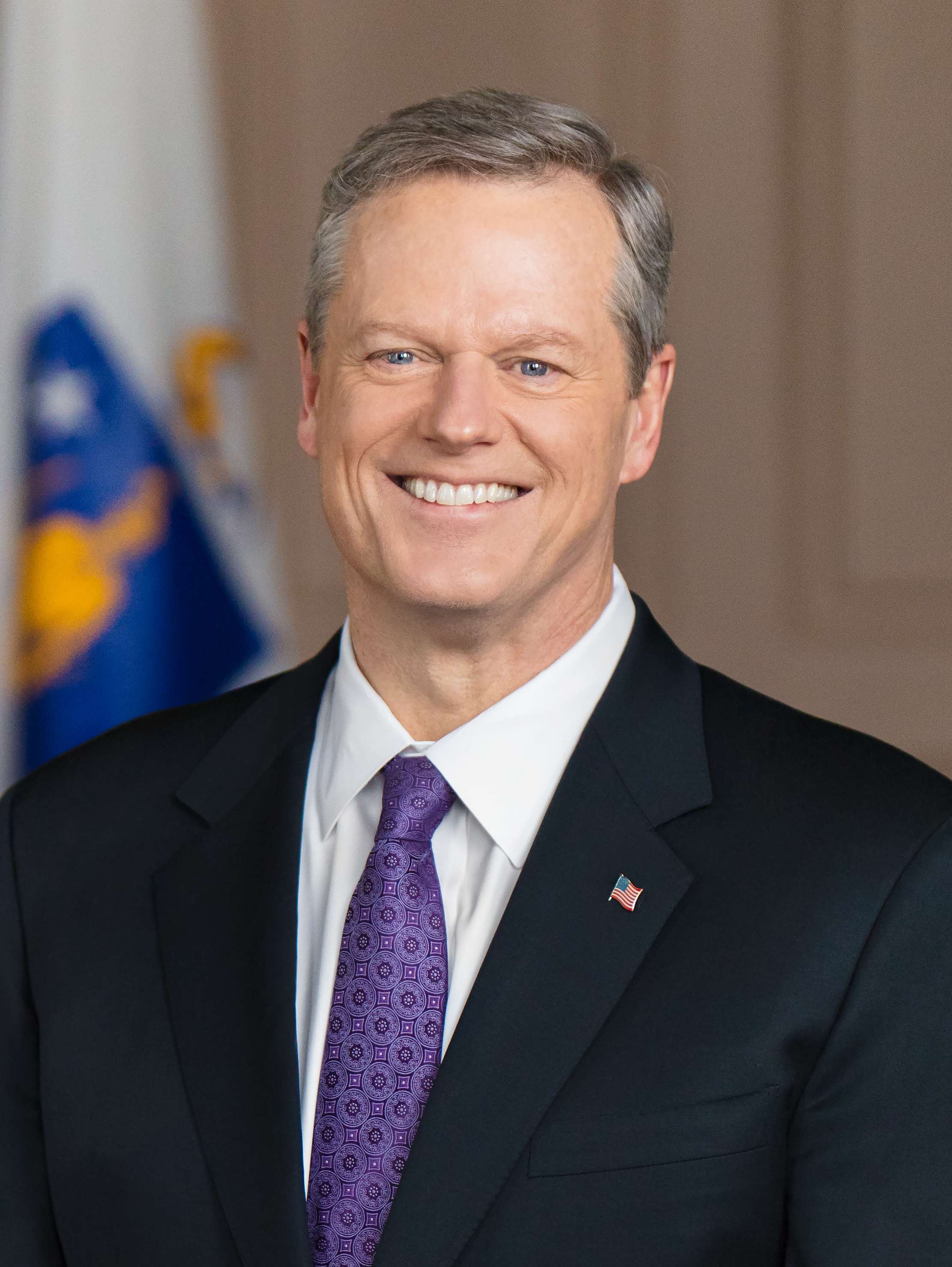
- Official portrait, 2018

6th President of the National Collegiate Athletic Association
- Incumbent
- Assumed office March 1, 2023
- Preceded by: Mark Emmert

72nd Governor of Massachusetts
- In office January 8, 2015 – January 5, 2023
- Lieutenant: Karyn Polito
- Preceded by: Deval Patrick
- Succeeded by: Maura Healey

Secretary of Administration and Finance of Massachusetts
- In office November 1994 – September 1998
- Governor: Bill Weld; Paul Cellucci
- Preceded by: Mark E. Robinson
- Succeeded by: Frederick Laskey

Secretary of Health and Human Services of Massachusetts
- In office October 1992 – November 1994
- Governor: Bill Weld
- Preceded by: David Forsberg
- Succeeded by: Gerald Whitburn

Personal details
- Born: Charles Duane Baker Jr. November 13, 1956 (age 70) Elmira, New York, U.S.
- Party: Republican
- Spouse: Lauren Schadt (m. 1987)
- Children: 3
- Relatives: Charles Baker (father)
- Education: Harvard University (BA); Northwestern University (MBA)

Charles Duane Baker Jr. (born November 13, 1956) is an American businessman and former politician serving as the sixth president of the National Collegiate Athletic Association (NCAA) since 2023. A member of the Republican Party, he served as the 72nd governor of Massachusetts from 2015 to 2023, and held two cabinet positions under two of the state's previous governors. He also served for ten years as the CEO of Harvard Pilgrim Health Care.

Baker was raised in Needham, Massachusetts, earned a bachelor's degree from Harvard University in 1979, and later obtained an Master of Business Administration from Northwestern University's Kellogg School of Management. In 1991, he became Massachusetts undersecretary of health and human services under Governor Bill Weld. In 1992, he was appointed secretary of health and human services of Massachusetts. He later served as secretary of administration and finance under Weld and his successor, Paul Cellucci.

After working in government for eight years, Baker left to become CEO of Harvard Vanguard Medical Associates and later Harvard Pilgrim Health Care, a nonprofit health benefits company. During this time, he served three years as a selectman of Swampscott and considered a run for Massachusetts governor in 2006. He stepped down in July 2009 to run for governor on a platform of fiscal conservatism and cultural liberalism. He was unopposed in the Republican primary but lost the 2010 general election to Democratic incumbent Deval Patrick.

In 2014, Baker ran for governor again and narrowly defeated Democratic nominee Martha Coakley. In 2018, he was reelected handily over Democratic challenger Jay Gonzalez with 67% of the vote, the largest vote share in a Massachusetts gubernatorial election since 1994. Nonpartisan polls consistently found him to be among the nation's most popular governors. In December 2021, Baker and his Lieutenant Governor Karyn Polito both announced that they would not seek reelection in 2022. Baker and Polito are the last Republicans to win or hold statewide office in Massachusetts.

On December 15, 2022, Baker was named as Mark Emmert's successor as president of the NCAA. He assumed the role on March 1, 2023.

== Early life and career ==
Baker was born on November 13, 1956, in Elmira, New York. Of English ancestry, his family has been in what is now the northeastern United States since the Colonial era. He is the fourth generation in the family to bear the forename Charles. His great-grandfather Charles D. Baker was an assistant United States attorney in New York, who served several years in the New York State Assembly. His grandfather Charles D. Baker Jr. was a prominent politician in Newburyport, Massachusetts. His father, Charles Duane Baker, a Harvard graduate, was a buyer for the Westinghouse Electric Corporation. His mother, Alice Elizabeth "Betty" (née Ghormley), remained at home. Baker's father was a conservative Republican and his mother a liberal Democrat; the family was often drawn into political arguments at the dinner table. In 1965 his father became vice president of Harbridge House, a Boston management consulting firm. Baker grew up with two younger brothers, Jonathan and Alex, in Needham, Massachusetts, before moving to Rockport. He grew up playing football, hockey, and baseball; he has described his childhood as "pretty all-American."

In 1969, the Bakers moved to Washington, D.C., where the elder Baker was named deputy undersecretary of the U.S. Department of Transportation in the Nixon Administration, becoming the department's assistant secretary for policy and international affairs the next year, and in both capacities serving under Secretary of Transportation and former Massachusetts governor John Volpe. His father also served as undersecretary of the U.S. Department of Health and Human Services in the Reagan Administration under U.S. Representative Margaret Heckler. The Bakers returned to Needham in 1971, where Baker attended Needham High School. He served on the student council, played basketball, and joined DeMolay International, a youth fraternity organization. In a Bay State Conference championship basketball game, a ball he inbounded with two seconds left on the clock was tipped away by a player from Dedham High School, causing Needham to lose by one point. Baker graduated from Needham High School in 1975, alongside future Governor of New Jersey, Phil Murphy.

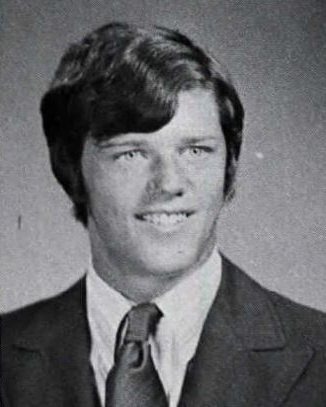
Baker's yearbook photo, c. 1975

Baker attended Harvard College and graduated in 1979 with a Bachelor of Arts in English, where, by his own admission, he was a C-student-turned-B-student. He later said he went to Harvard "because of the brand" and wrote, "With a few exceptions... those four years are ones I would rather forget." While at Harvard, Baker played on the JV basketball team, and was a member of the Fly Club. He then attended Northwestern University's Kellogg School of Management, where he received an MBA. After graduating, Baker served as corporate communications director for the Massachusetts High Technology Council.

== Positions in the Weld and Cellucci gubernatorial administrations ==
In the late 1980s, Baker was hired as codirector of the newly founded Pioneer Institute, a Boston-based libertarian think tank. Lovett C. "Pete" Peters, the institute's founder, later recommended him to Bill Weld, the incoming Republican governor of Massachusetts. Weld took office in January 1991 and hired him as undersecretary of health and human services.

In cutting back state programs and social services, Baker caused controversy from early on. However, some government officials called him an "innovator" and "one of the big stars among the secretariats and the agencies." Baker was promoted to secretary of health and human services in November 1992, and was later made secretary of administration and finance, a position he continued to hold after Weld resigned in 1997 and Paul Cellucci took over as acting governor. In mid-1998, Cellucci offered him the lieutenant governor spot on the ticket, but Baker declined.

As secretary of administration and finance, Baker was a main architect of the Big Dig financing plan. In 1997 the federal government was planning to cut funding for the Big Dig by $300 million per year. The state set up a trust and sold Grant Anticipation Notes (GANs) to investors. The notes were secured by promising future federal highway funds. As federal highway dollars are awarded to Massachusetts, the money is used to pay off the GANs. According to a 2007 blue-ribbon panel, the cost overruns of the Big Dig, combined with Baker's plan for financing them, ultimately left the state transportation system underfunded by $1 billion a year. Baker defended his plan as responsible, effective, and based on previous government officials' good-faith assurances that the Big Dig would be built on time and on budget. However, as he was developing the plan, Baker had also had to take into account that Governor Cellucci was dead-set against any new taxes or fees. Former state transportation secretary James J. Kerasiotes, the public face of the Big Dig, praised Baker's work on the financing and said, "We were caught in a confluence of events," adding that "Charlie had a job to do, and he did his job and he did it well."

== Health industry career ==
In September 1998, Baker left state government and became CEO of Harvard Vanguard Medical Associates, a New England–based physicians' group. In May 1999, he was named president and CEO of Harvard Vanguard's parent company, Harvard Pilgrim Health Care, a non-profit health benefits organization. The company had lost $58 million in 1998, and it was predicted to lose over $90 million in 1999. Baker responded by cutting the workforce by 90 people, increasing premiums, establishing new contracts with Massachusetts physicians, reassessing the company's financial structure, and outsourcing its information technology. During his tenure as CEO, the company had 24 profitable quarters in a row and earned recognition from the National Committee for Quality Assurance as its choice for America's Best Health Plan for five consecutive years.

In mid-2007, Baker was invited to join the board of trustees of Beth Israel Deaconess Medical Center. Because of his role in the insurance business, the appointment caused controversy, but he and the hospital's CEO, Paul F. Levy, denied any conflict of interest.

== Return to government ==
Baker ran for the board of selectmen of Swampscott, Massachusetts, in 2004, and won by a "landslide." While on the board, he was noted for a businesslike approach to local issues; his fellow selectmen described him as "low-key" and budget-oriented. After serving three years, he chose not to run for reelection in 2007.

In mid-2005, there were indications that Governor Mitt Romney would not seek reelection in 2006. Baker was widely considered a top contender for the Republican nomination. Analysts wrote that he was unlikely to defeat Lieutenant Governor Kerry Healey, who had already announced her candidacy. Healey was the 2–1 favorite among Republican voters in a Boston Globe poll and had much stronger financial backing. Furthermore, ethics guidelines at Harvard Pilgrim prevented Baker from carrying out any political fundraising while he held an executive position. After giving the idea "serious consideration", in August 2005 he announced that he would not run, citing the burden it would be on his family and the difficulty of campaigning against Healey.

In late 2006, Baker was named to a Budget and Finance working group for incoming Governor Deval Patrick's transition committee. In 2008, he joined the Public Advisory Board of the New Hampshire Institute of Politics (NHIOP) at Saint Anselm College.

== Gubernatorial campaigns ==
=== 2010 ===
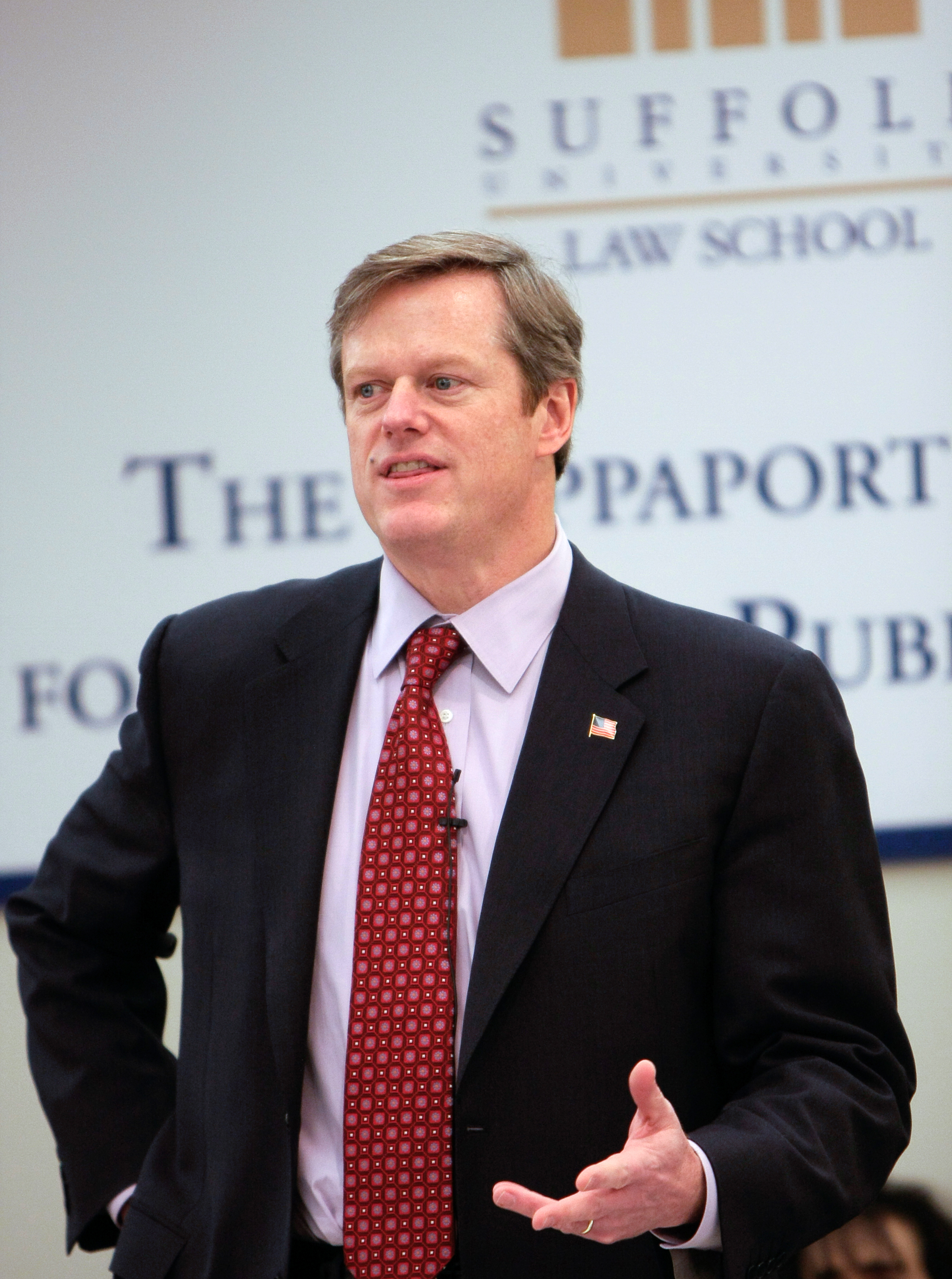
Baker at the Rappaport Center for Law and Public Policy at Suffolk University Law School on February 4, 2010

In 2009 Baker was again rumored to be a contender for the Massachusetts gubernatorial election. Former governor Bill Weld strongly encouraged him to run, calling him "the heart and soul of the Weld–Cellucci administration." On July 8, 2009, Baker announced his candidacy, and on July 17 he stepped down from his position at Harvard Pilgrim Health Care. His campaign formally began on January 30, 2010. His opponents were Democratic incumbent Deval Patrick, Green-Rainbow candidate Jill Stein, and an independent, state treasurer and Receiver General Tim Cahill. For his running mate, Baker chose Senate minority leader Richard R. Tisei. At the state Republican Convention on April 17, 2010, Baker won the Republican nomination over former Independent candidate Christy Mihos with 89% of the delegate vote, thus avoiding a primary fight with Mihos.

Baker ran as a social liberal (in favor of gay marriage and abortion rights) and a fiscal conservative, stressing job creation as his primary focus. He reinforced his socially liberal position by selecting as his running mate Richard Tisei, an openly gay Republican who had supported same-sex marriage legalization efforts in Massachusetts.

Baker ran against Patrick in an atmosphere of voter discontent, with a slow economy and high unemployment, which he used to his advantage during the campaign. Patrick, facing low approval ratings, criticized Baker for his role in the Big Dig financing plan, and for raising health premiums while head of Harvard Pilgrim. Despite an anti-incumbent mood among voters, Baker lost the November 2 general election with 42% of the vote to Patrick's 48%. "We fought the good fight," said Baker in his concession speech. "We have no cause to hang our heads and will be stronger for having fought this one."

After the 2010 election, Baker was named an executive in residence at General Catalyst Partners and a member of the board of directors at the Tremont Credit Union.

=== 2014 ===
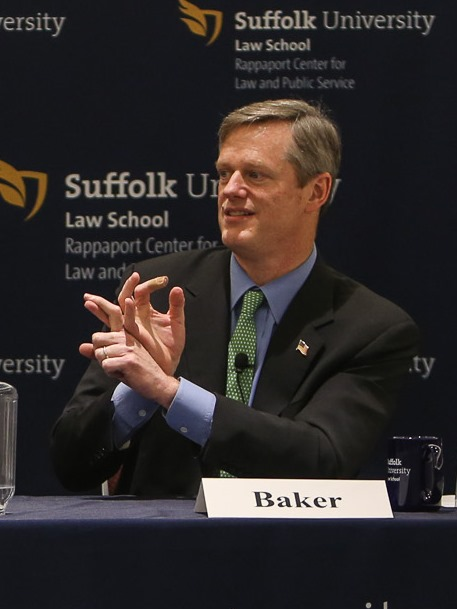
Baker at the Rappaport Center again on February 4, 2014

On September 4, 2013, Baker announced that he would run for governor again in 2014 when incumbent governor Deval Patrick retired. On November 25, 2013, Mark Fisher, a businessman and Tea Party member announced that he would run against Baker in the Republican primary. In December 2013, Baker chose as his running mate Karyn Polito, a former opponent of same-sex marriage who had come to support marriage equality. Baker again received the Republican Party's nomination, winning its primary.

In July 2014, Democrats criticized Baker for refusing to say whether he supported a provision in the new gun control law that gave police chiefs discretion to deny firearms identification cards, which are required to purchase shotguns and rifles. He later said in a debate that he would have signed the gun control bill as it was signed by Governor Patrick.

After polls closed on election night, preliminary results showed that Baker had won the election. Later in the morning, Coakley conceded. The final election tally showed Baker with 48.5% of the vote to Coakley's 46.6%.

=== 2018 ===
Heading into the 2018 election, Baker had been consistently rated as one of the most popular governors in the country.

Baker was challenged in the Republican primary by Scott Lively, an evangelical pastor, who received enough votes at the state convention to qualify for ballot access. However, Baker easily fended off this challenge, receiving nearly 70% of the vote in the Republican primary on September 4, 2018.

In the general election, Baker faced Jay Gonzalez, a private health insurance executive who also served under Governor Deval Patrick as the state's secretary of administration and finance. Gonzalez suffered from low name recognition throughout the campaign and polls indicated that Baker would receive a majority of the vote from registered Democrats in the state. Baker was reelected in a landslide with 67% of the vote and the highest vote total in the history of Massachusetts gubernatorial elections. This was also the best performance by a Massachusetts Republican governor since Bill Weld's reelection in 1994.

== Governor of Massachusetts ==
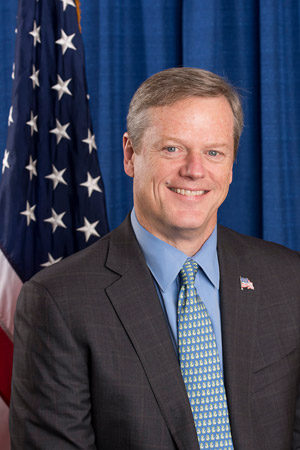
Baker's first gubernatorial portrait

Baker was inaugurated as the 72nd governor of Massachusetts on January 8, 2015, at the Massachusetts State House in Boston. He was inaugurated for his second term on January 3, 2019. He is considered a liberal or moderate Republican and has been a frequent critic of President Donald Trump. He supported the impeachment inquiry into Donald Trump that began in September 2019. After the January 6 United States Capitol attack, Baker called for Trump to be removed from office. On January 3, 2023, Baker delivered his farewell address from the Massachusetts State House.

=== Economic policy ===
At the start of his governorship, Baker launched the Community Compact Program run by the Community Compact Cabinet. The program saw the state providing funding to "best practice" programs in communities. At the end of Baker’s governorship, Sean Cronin (deputy commissioner of the Massachusetts Division of Local Services) claimed that his Community Compact Cabinet had distributed 1,400 grants amounting to $65 million.

In August 2016, Baker signed into a municipal finance modernization bill that he had first proposed the previous December. In January 2016, Baker proposed a five-year, $918 million economic development bill that he would sign into law the following August.

In September 2017, Baker, joined by Massachusetts U.S. Senators Elizabeth Warren and Ed Markey, Massachusetts U.S. Representative Stephen Lynch, as well as officials from the U.S. Army Corps of Engineers, the International Longshoremen's Association, the Massachusetts Port Authority, and other local elected officials, announced the beginning of a $350 million dredging project to expand Boston Harbor to accommodate larger ships.

Also in February 2018, Baker welcomed an announcement by the Massachusetts Mutual Life Insurance Company that it was going to add 1,500 jobs to its Springfield headquarters and build a second $300 million location with 500 jobs in the South Boston Seaport District. In March 2018, the Associated Industries of Massachusetts released its business confidence index showing that employer confidence in the state had hit a 17-year high, and Baker filed a $610 million economic development bill. In April 2018, Baker submitted a request to the U.S. Treasury Department that 138 census tracts in Massachusetts be designated as "opportunity zones" under the Tax Cuts and Jobs Act of 2017. The following month, the U.S. Treasury Department approved all 138 opportunity zone designations Baker requested the previous month.

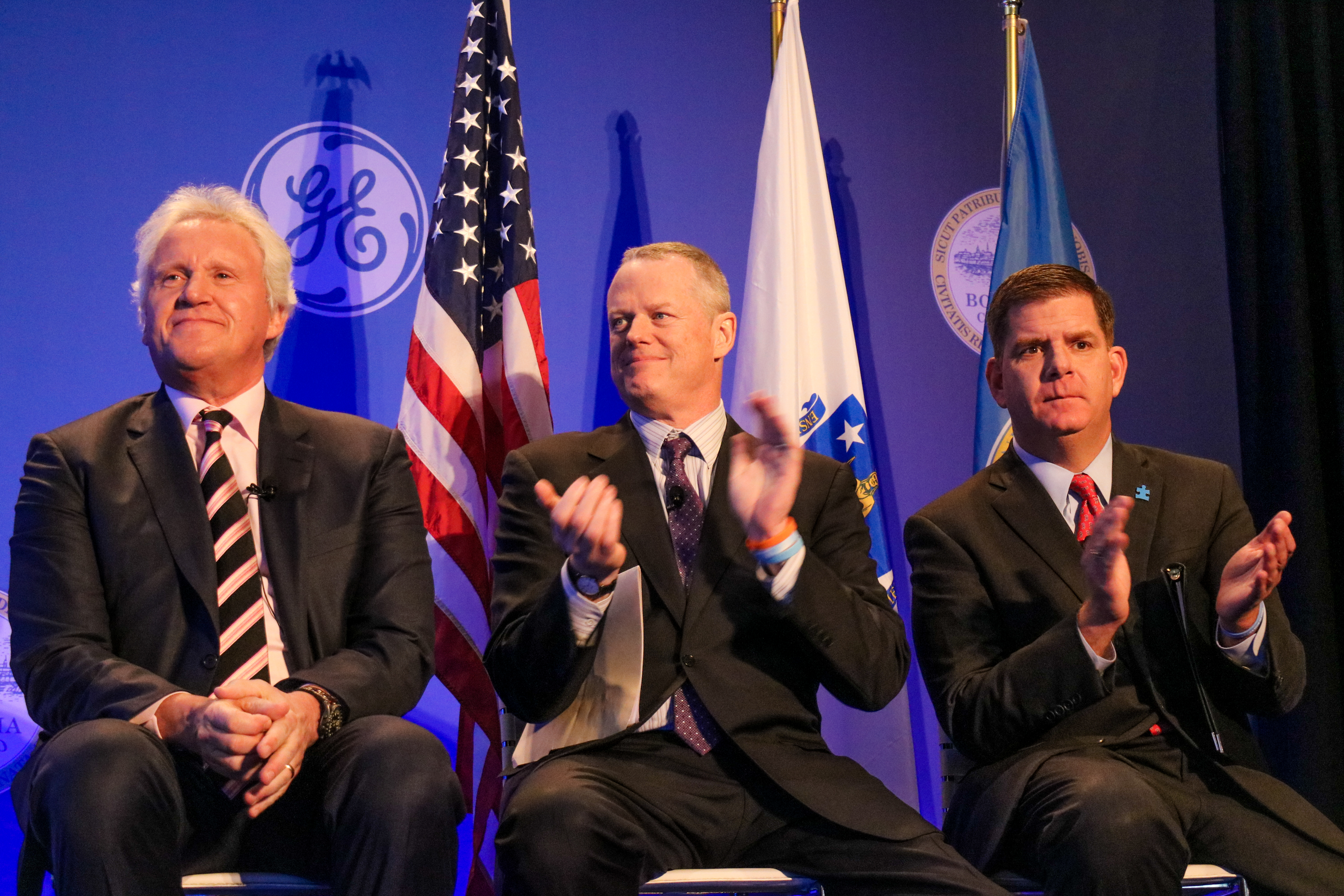
Baker (center) with General Electric CEO Jeff Immelt (left) and Boston mayor Marty Walsh (right) at the April 2016 formal announcement that General Electric had agreed to move its headquarters to Boston

In January 2016, General Electric announced that it was moving its corporate headquarters to the South Boston Seaport District following $120 million in grants and other programs offered by Baker's administration and $25 million in property tax relief offered by Boston mayor Marty Walsh.

In January 2017, Baker's administration announced that Massachusetts would enter a second $250 million public-private partnership with the Manufacturing USA network to form a robotics manufacturing institute in the state. In February 2017, Baker's administration announced $35 million in capital grants for life science facilities at 14 colleges, graduate schools, and research institutes in the state, and the following month, Baker's administration announced the formation of a new broadband internet access grant making program that would award $20 million in grants to over 40 towns in Western and Central Massachusetts. In April 2017, Baker's administration announced a $5 million grant to the Worcester Polytechnic Institute to help launch a digital healthcare development center.

=== Housing ===
In October 2015, Baker announced a strategy to leverage unused or underutilized state land for economic development and market-rate or affordable housing. In May 2016, Baker announced that his administration would devote $1.1 billion to the development and preservation of affordable and workforce housing over the subsequent five years in the state's capital budget, and Baker also started a $100 million fund for creating workforce housing through MassHousing. In August 2016, Baker announced $90 million in subsidies and tax credits to 26 affordable housing development projects in the state.

=== Transportation ===
Before his tenure as governor, Baker supported the 2014 ballot measure that repealed indexing the state gas tax to inflation. On his first day in office, Baker directed the Massachusetts Department of Transportation to release $100 million in aid to local governments to fund upgrades to transportation infrastructure. In February 2015, Baker directed the Massachusetts Department of Public Utilities to issue a public notice clarifying the status of transportation network companies (such as Uber and Lyft) while his administration developed a regulatory framework for the industry. In the wake of the 2014–15 winter, Baker started a $30 million pothole repair fund. In June 2015, Baker submitted a $2.13 billion capital budget for fiscal year 2016.

In October 2015, Baker and the state's Division of Insurance approved a proposed insurance policy by USAA to provide additional coverage to current policyholders who are employed as transportation network company drivers. Having proposing similar legislation the previous year, in August 2016, Baker signed into law a bill regulating transportation network companies by implementing a 20-cent per ride company surcharge, mandating vehicle insurance requirements, and background checks for company drivers.

In August 2016, Baker signed into law a bill that expanded a program to improve local street network safety and efficiency that was launched earlier that year, authorized $50 million in spending over the subsequent five years for repairs to small municipal bridges, and which included a $750 million authorization request for the federal aid highway program. In October 2016, Baker issued an executive order to create a regulatory framework for the testing of driverless cars in Massachusetts, and in the same month, oversaw the opening of the state's electronic tolling system along the Massachusetts Turnpike. In April 2017, the Massachusetts Department of Public Utilities released data showing that more than 8,000 of the 70,000 drivers for transportation network companies who applied failed to pass the state background check requirement signed into law by Baker the previous August.

In November 2017, Baker called for the state legislature to pass legislation banning handheld cellphone use while driving (as well as other handheld electronic devices), with exceptions for hands-free technology usage and emergency situations. In January 2018 Baker signed an executive order that created a commission study the state's transportation needs. At Springfield Union Station in June 2018, Baker, along with Massachusetts U.S. representative Richard Neal and Springfield mayor Domenic Sarno, issued an RFP for a consulting group to study the feasibility of an east–west passenger rail line in the state from Boston to Springfield (or potentially Pittsfield), announced a pilot passenger rail service in between Greenfield and Springfield, and also announced the launch of the Hartford Line commuter rail service from Springfield through Hartford, Connecticut, to New Haven.

In July 2018, Baker line-item vetoed a pilot program for road congestion pricing, while the state legislature rejected an amendment to the state budget Baker proposed for a congestion study as an alternative to the pilot program. In November 2019, Baker signed into law a bill banning the use of handheld electronic devices while driving.

=== Education policy ===
==== PK-12 ====
In October 2015, Baker filed legislation to increase the state cap on the number of new charter schools in the state by 12 per year, and later in the same month, testified in favor of the legislation before the state legislature. In January 2016, Baker announced $83.5 million in funding for vocational education in the state, as well as a $72.1 million increase in the state's Chapter 70 local education funding and a $42 million increase in unrestricted local aid for education for fiscal year 2017, and the following month, Baker proposed increasing the state's charter school reimbursement formula to school districts by $20.5 million.

In March 2016, Baker opposed a proposed overhaul to the state's charter school system being debated in the Massachusetts Senate at the time, and the following month, the Massachusetts Senate rejected Baker's proposed charter school cap increase. In July 2016, Baker vetoed a pay increase for pre-kindergarten teachers. The following month, Massachusetts students ranked first in the nation on their average ACT scores. In November 2016, Baker campaigned on behalf of a ballot initiative to raise the state cap on new charter schools which failed to pass, and in the same month, Baker's administration expanded a STEM internship program allowing high school students to work at related companies in the state.

In March 2017, Baker proposed a six percent pay increase for pre-kindergarten teachers. In May 2017, Baker and Boston mayor Marty Walsh announced a pilot program making college tuition and mandatory fees free to qualifying low-income Boston public high school graduates attending Bunker Hill Community College, Roxbury Community College, or Massachusetts Bay Community College. In October 2017, Baker attended the launch of an early college program at Lawrence High School allowing students to take courses at Merrimack College or Northern Essex Community College.

In November 2017, Baker signed into law a bill expanding options for schools in fulfilling English as a second language requirements for their immigrant students.

==== Higher education ====
In April 2016, Baker announced a college affordability and completion plan for the state's public universities and colleges. In September 2016, Baker's administration announced their intention to work with the state's Department of Higher Education and the University of Massachusetts system to develop a pilot program to support the MicroMasters programs developed by the massive open online course provider edX. In February 2017, Baker's administration announced $35 million in capital grants for life science facilities at 14 colleges, graduate schools, and research institutes in the state. In April 2017, Baker's administration announced $78 million in capital funding towards repairs of the University of Massachusetts Boston underground parking garage.

In April 2018, University of Massachusetts Amherst and Mount Ida College administrators announced that the former school would acquire the latter's campus in Newton after the latter college's closure. The acquisition received public opposition from University of Massachusetts Boston faculty and students, due to the proximity of Mount Ida's campus to the Boston campus and UMass Boston's budget deficit caused by extensive campus repairs and expansion (ultimately necessitated by the negligent construction of the UMass Boston campus in the 1970s) that have led to cutbacks in academic spending and offerings of courses required for graduation. Despite controversy, the sale of the Mount Ida campus to UMass Amherst was approved by Attorney General Maura Healey's office in May 2018.

In July 2018, Baker included an amendment to a $583 million supplemental appropriations bill requiring public and private colleges and universities to report any financial liabilities or risks to the long-term financial viability of the institution to the Massachusetts Department of Higher Education, which Baker signed into law as a full bill in November 2019. In February 2019, the UMass Board of Trustees unanimously approved a 99-year final lease agreement for the Bayside Expo Center with Accordia Partners for up to $235 million.

=== Energy policy ===
==== Energy efficiency ====
In May 2015, Baker's administration announced a $10 million energy storage initiative. In February 2016, Baker launched a $15 million initiative creating an inter-secretariat working group between state agencies to write a report identifying better means of allocating funding to low- and middle-income residents to access clean energy. In September 2016, the American Council for an Energy-Efficient Economy ranked Massachusetts first in energy efficiency for the sixth straight year. In April 2017, the inter-secretariat working group formed by Baker in February 2016 issued its final report and Baker announced the release of $10 million in grants to increase access for low-income Massachusetts residents to energy efficiency projects, such as solar panels, as the final component of the same initiative. Also in April 2017, the Union of Concerned Scientists ranked Massachusetts first in energy efficiency standards and third in overall clean energy progress.

In June 2017, Baker's administration announced a 200 megawatt-hour energy storage target in accordance with energy diversification legislation Baker signed into law in August 2016. In December 2017, Baker's administration announced that it was awarding $20 million in grants to 26 projects to develop the state's energy storage market, in accordance with the same energy diversification law and the administration's energy storage initiative begun in May 2015. In December 2018, the Massachusetts Department of Energy Resources released a comprehensive energy plan in accordance with an executive order Baker issued in September 2016 for state agencies to develop a statewide adaptation plan for climate change.

==== Hydropower and wind power ====
In July 2015, Baker's administration filed legislation to stabilize electricity rates in Massachusetts by increasing access to hydroelectricity with Baker himself stating: "This legislation is critical to reducing our carbon footprint, meeting the goals of the Global Warming Solutions Act and protecting ratepayers already struck by sky high energy prices." In March 2016, the legislation received the endorsement of all three of the Energy and Environmental Affairs Secretaries of the Deval Patrick administration, and the following August, Baker signed the legislation into law, requiring the state to procure 1,200 megawatts of hydropower, as well as 1,600 megawatts of offshore wind power. In June 2017, Massachusetts utilities issued the first RFP under the energy diversification law signed by Baker in August 2016, and the following month, five major bids were submitted.

In January 2018, Baker's administration announced that Eversource Energy's Northern Pass Project had received preliminary approval for the hydropower procurement under the energy diversification law. The following month, the New Hampshire Site Evaluation Committee rejected the Northern Pass Project's permit application to build a transmission line through New Hampshire, raising uncertainty to the status of Eversource's proposal. In March 2018, the Massachusetts Department of Energy Resources announced that the state's electric distribution companies had "terminated the conditional selection of the Northern Pass Hydro project," and were concluding negotiations on the RFP runner-up proposal, Central Maine Power's 1.2 GW New England Clean Energy Connect project, as a replacement. The Maine Department of Environmental Protection approved the project in May 2020.

=== Environmental policy ===
==== Climate change ====
In January 2016, Baker's administration announced that Massachusetts was on track to meet its greenhouse gas reduction goals. In September 2016, following the record breaking snowfall in Boston from the 2014–15 North American winter and during a severe drought, Baker signed an executive order directing various state cabinet offices to develop and implement a statewide, comprehensive climate change adaptation plan. In December 2016, Baker's administration released regulations to reduce greenhouse gas emissions from the natural gas, transportation, and electricity generation industries. In January 2017, in order to meet emission reductions goals, Baker signed into law a bill to promote the sale and use of electric vehicles. In February 2017, Baker joined a bipartisan coalition of governors that sent an open letter to President Donald Trump, calling on his administration to support renewable energy.

In May 2017, prior to the United States withdrawal from the 2015 Paris Agreement on climate change mitigation, Baker and Vermont Governor Phil Scott wrote an open letter to U.S. Secretary of Energy Rick Perry urging the Trump Administration to remain committed to the agreement. After President Trump unilaterally withdrew the United States from the agreement, Baker criticized the decision and was among ten American governors that agreed to continue upholding the standards of the agreement within their states.

After a pair of nor'easters from March 1 through March 3 and March 6 through March 8, Baker said he planned to file legislation the following week on climate change, and on March 15, 2018, he submitted a $1.4 billion climate resiliency bond bill that called on all Massachusetts town governments to formulate vulnerability and hazard mitigation plans to address climate change problems unique to their communities. In August 2018, Baker signed into law bipartisan legislation authorizing $2.4 billion in capital spending on climate change safeguards for municipalities and businesses, reforestation and forest protection, and environmental resource protection, and the Massachusetts Department of Environmental Protection released data showing that while greenhouse gas emissions in Massachusetts rose by 3% in 2015.

In December 2018, Baker's administration announced that it would extend the state's electric vehicle rebate program through the end of the following June, and a transportation commission Baker enacted by executive order the previous January released a report stating that all vehicles sold in the state should be electric by 2040. The same month, the Massachusetts Department of Energy Resources released a comprehensive energy plan in accordance with an executive order Baker issued in September 2016 for state agencies to develop a statewide adaptation plan for climate change, and Massachusetts, along with eight other states and the District of Columbia, announced that it would participate in the interstate Transportation and Climate Initiative to reduce greenhouse gas emissions from the transportation sector; he withdrew from the TCI, in part, because it was "no longer necessary." In January 2019, the Massachusetts Department of Environmental Protection released data showing that greenhouse gas emissions in Massachusetts declined by 2.5% in 2016.

==== Water quality ====
On April 21, 2016, Baker's administration sided with the U.S. Environmental Protection Agency in a dispute with General Electric over cleanup of the Housatonic River. The next week, after four Boston public schools (including Boston Latin Academy) were found to have levels of lead above the state action level in fountain drinking water, the administration announced that it would provide $2 million from the Massachusetts Clean Water Trust to fund a testing program operated by the Massachusetts Department of Environmental Protection to provide technical assistance to public school districts in assessing samples of water both from fountains and from taps used in food preparation. The next November, Baker provided an additional $750,000 to the program for further technical assistance with sampling and testing.

Also in April 2016, Baker filed legislation requesting that the state Department of Environmental Protection be delegated to oversee Clean Water Act pollution discharge permits from the U.S. Environmental Protection Agency along with 46 other states, and then again in March 2017 after the previous bill received opposition from Democrats on the state legislature's Joint Committee on Environment, Natural Resources and Agriculture. In April 2017, Baker's administration awarded $900,000 in grants to five different public water suppliers. In February 2018, the administration announced that 58 clean water initiatives and 28 drinking water projects across Massachusetts would be eligible for $610 million in loans to fund construction projects to upgrade or replace drinking water and wastewater infrastructure, reduce treatment plant energy usage and costs, and improve water quality.

=== Health care policy ===
==== Federal ====
In May 2015, Baker sent a request to U.S. Secretary of Health and Human Services Sylvia Mathews Burwell to delay changes under the Patient Protection and Affordable Care Act (ACA) to the small business health insurance market in Massachusetts until the state government could formally file for a waiver, which was secured the next month and authorized in August. In May 2016, Baker's administration announced that the Centers for Medicare & Medicaid Services gave Massachusetts permission to continue allowing small businesses to purchase health insurance year-round, and the following July, secured a one-year waiver from the U.S. Department of Health and Human Services to allow Massachusetts health insurers to continue using small group rating factors unaligned with the ACA.

In October 2016, Baker criticized the length of the Food and Drug Administration's approval process for generic drugs, stated that progress was being made with the Obama Administration on a waiver extension for the state Medicaid program MassHealth, and expressed support for public discussion about changes to the ACA early the following year, stating: "It's my hope that states will be permitted to engage the federal government in an honest conversation about what's working and what needs to be worked on with respect to the ACA." In November 2016, Baker's administration received approval from the Centers for Medicare and Medicaid Services to implement a five-year waiver authorizing a $52.4 billion restructuring of MassHealth. In December 2016, Baker announced his support for the 21st Century Cures Act passed by the 114th U.S. Congress.

In January 2017, in an open letter to U.S. House Majority Leader Kevin McCarthy, Baker defended certain provisions of the ACA and urged the 115th U.S. Congress not to repeal the law too quickly and disrupt insurance markets. In March 2017, after writing in an open letter to all members of the Massachusetts congressional delegation that the state could lose $1 billion in federal health care funding under the American Health Care Act of 2017 (AHCA), Baker opposed the version of the AHCA being voted on by the U.S. House of Representatives at the time. After the House passed it the following May, Baker released a statement saying that he was "disappointed by today's vote" but that as "the U.S. Senate takes up this bill, we will continue to advocate for the Commonwealth's priorities so that all residents have access to the health coverage they need", and urged Congress to reject the bill.

In June 2017, Baker, Ohio Governor John Kasich, Colorado Governor John Hickenlooper, Montana Governor Steve Bullock, Nevada Governor Brian Sandoval, Pennsylvania Governor Tom Wolf, and Louisiana Governor John Bel Edwards sent an open letter to U.S. Senate Majority Leader Mitch McConnell and Minority Leader Chuck Schumer stating their opposition to the AHCA bill passed the previous month due to its spending cuts to Medicaid and called on Senate leaders to craft a more bipartisan reform. Later the same month, Baker wrote in an open letter to Massachusetts U.S. Senator Elizabeth Warren that more than 250,000 Massachusetts residents could lose health care coverage under the Senate AHCA amendment, the Better Care Reconciliation Act of 2017 (BCRA), and the next month, in a second open letter to Senate leadership that now also included Virginia Governor Terry McAuliffe, Maryland Governor Larry Hogan, and Vermont Governor Phil Scott, Baker and nine other governors also opposed the Health Care Freedom Act of 2017 (HCFA).

In October 2017, Baker opposed the Trump administration's decision to end ACA cost-sharing reduction payments, and along with the previous group of governors, wrote a fourth open letter to Senate leadership supporting the Bipartisan Health Care Stabilization Act of 2017 sponsored by Senators Lamar Alexander and Patty Murray. In November 2017, Baker wrote to Speaker of the U.S. House of Representatives Paul Ryan and U.S. House Minority Leader Nancy Pelosi urging them to reauthorize the Children's Health Insurance Program (CHIP).

==== State ====
In February 2016, Baker signed into law a bill endorsed by the American Cancer Society and the Dana–Farber Cancer Institute that increased the minimum age for using tanning facilities to 18 in order to counter increases in skin cancer among minors. In March 2016, Baker's administration cut $60 million from the state program Health Safety Net and Baker said that he wanted hospital pricing resolved by the state legislature rather than by a ballot initiative. The next May, he signed into law a compromise bill on hospital pricing. In August 2016, the state legislature overrode Baker's veto of legislation requiring health insurance coverage for long-term Lyme disease treatment. Later the same month, Baker signed into law a bill mandating insurance coverage of treatment for HIV-associated lipodystrophy caused by older HIV medications.

In December 2016, due to Baker's midyear budget cuts, Baystate Health lost $1 million in funding. In January 2017, in his state budget proposal for fiscal year 2018, Baker proposed a $2,000-per-employee assessment on businesses that do not offer health insurance to counter spending growth in MassHealth, which was opposed by the state business community and supported by health care unions. In February 2017, Baker's administration announced that the Massachusetts Health Connector enrolled the highest number of health insurance applicants since the implementation of the Patient Protection and Affordable Care Act (ACA). Also in February 2017, Baker's administration announced that it signed a contract with Correct Care Solutions to provide clinical patient care at Bridgewater State Hospital, and the next April, the administration announced that Correct Care Solutions had transitioned Bridgewater State Hospital to improved patient care.

After signaling a willingness to compromise on his proposed employer health insurance assessment the previous March, Baker signed into law $200 million in new fees and fines on Massachusetts employers to counter spending increases in MassHealth in August 2017. In September 2017, the state government's Center for Health Information and Analysis released data showing that the state curbed the growth of its health care spending for the first time in three years. In March 2018, Baker signed into law greater patient privacy protections from health insurance companies, and the next month, a commission Baker enacted the previous year to investigate evidence-based approaches to behavioral health released its final report.

==== COVID-19 ====
Baker's handling of the COVID-19 pandemic has received mixed reviews. Massachusetts has one of the country's highest infection and death rates. More than half the deaths happened in state-supervised nursing homes, in particular those serving persons of color. Baker's lack of transparency about infections and death rates has been criticized by the media and public health researchers have urged him to follow the lead of the CDC and many other states and provide accurate and complete data.

==== Abortion and contraception ====
Baker is pro-choice. In August 2016, he signed a bipartisan pay equity bill into law to diminish gender-based pay gaps in the state, which went into effect on July 1, 2018. In January 2017, Baker voiced support for the Women's Marches being held across the United States.

In July 2017, Baker signed into law a bill requiring employers to provide "reasonable accommodations" for female employees who are pregnant and banning employment discrimination in hiring or termination against female employees who are pregnant, which went into effect in April 2018. In October 2017, when the Trump administration issued new regulations allowing insurers and employers to opt out of contraceptive mandates, Baker reiterated his support for such mandates, and the next month signed into law a bill requiring Massachusetts insurers to cover birth control without copayments. In February 2018, Baker's administration announced a supplemental spending bill that included $1.6 million for clinical family planning services that would backfill federal funding for Planned Parenthood clinics. Baker said, "Our administration fully supports access to women's health care and family planning services, and is requesting supplemental state funding to support these critical services in the event of an interruption in federal funding."

In July 2018, Baker signed into law a bill repealing state abortion laws that would have been retroactively reinstated when Roe v. Wade was overturned, as well as laws against adultery, fornication, and physicians prescribing contraceptives to unmarried women. The same month, after Brett Kavanaugh's nomination to the Supreme Court, Baker urged the U.S. Senate to consider Kavanaugh's position on abortion as part of its vetting process, and was one of three Republican governors who declined to sign an open letter supporting Kavanaugh's nomination signed by 31 other governors. On the day before Kavanaugh's Senate confirmation vote in October 2018, Baker said he believed that Kavanaugh should not be on the Supreme Court, reiterating his concerns about Kavanaugh's views on Roe v. Wade, as well as the multiple sexual assault allegations made against Kavanaugh during the confirmation process.

In December 2020, Baker vetoed a bill that would lower to 16 the age at which someone can get an abortion without parental consent. The bill also extended the time frame for abortions beyond 24 weeks in cases in which the fetus cannot survive or the pregnancy would impose a substantial risk of grave impairment of the person's physical or mental health. Baker said, "I cannot support the sections of this proposal that expand the availability of later term abortions and permit minors age 16 and 17 to get an abortion without the consent of a parent or guardian". Massachusetts Republican Party Chairman Jim Lyons applauded Baker in a statement, saying "Governor Baker correctly recognized that this legislation simply goes too far, and he should be applauded for standing up and saying no to the abortion lobby". The state legislature overrode the veto five days later. In May 2022, after Justice Samuel Alito's draft opinion in Dobbs v. Jackson Women's Health Organization was leaked, Baker said overturning Roe v. Wade would be a "massive setback" for women. After the final opinion was issued in June 2022, officially overturning Roe v. Wade, Baker signed an executive order protecting abortion rights in Massachusetts.

=== Social policy ===
==== Immigration and race ====
Although Baker announced in July 2015 he would veto any bill that gave illegal immigrants in-state tuition and state aid for public colleges and universities, he maintained support for an existing Massachusetts statute that grants in-state tuition and state aid to Deferred Action for Childhood Arrivals (DACA) recipients. In September 2015, President Barack Obama's administration proposed accepting 10,000 Syrian Civil War refugees into the country, and Baker relayed his initial support for the proposal. In the wake of the November 2015 Paris attacks, Baker opposed allowing additional Syrian refugees into the state until he knew more about the federal government's process for vetting them.

In July 2016, Baker signed a bill into law that prevents illegal immigrants from obtaining driver's licenses. After Donald Trump became president in January 2017, Baker opposed the Trump administration's original and revised travel bans, arguing that "focusing on countries' predominant religions will not make the country safer", and wrote an open letter to then U.S. Secretary of Homeland Security John F. Kelly highlighting concerns with the effects of the travel ban on Massachusetts businesses, colleges and universities, and academic medical centers.

In February 2017, Baker issued an executive order to reestablish the state's Black Advisory Commission to advise his administration on issues of concern to the black community in Massachusetts. The next month, he said his administration was cooperating with an FBI investigation of bomb threats made against Jewish Community Centers in the state, calling the threats "horribly destructive and disturbing." In May 2017, Baker declared his opposition to proposed legislation that would make Massachusetts a sanctuary state, citing his belief that sanctuary status decisions are "best made at a local level." However, in July Baker said he was "open-minded" about the prospect of statewide sanctuary status.

In August 2017, after the Massachusetts Supreme Judicial Court ruled that local police departments cannot detain any person solely based on requests from federal immigration authorities the previous month, Baker's administration filed legislation that would allow the Massachusetts State Police and local departments to detain individuals previously convicted of a felony or "aliens [illegal immigrants] who pose a threat to public safety," but not to authorize local police to "enforce federal immigration law."

In September 2017, Baker opposed Trump's administrative decision to phase out the DACA program and said that U.S. Immigration and Customs Enforcement (ICE) raids targeting sanctuary cities should focus on arresting convicted criminals in the country illegally and not on illegal immigrants whose only crime is illegal entry. The same month, he criticized Trump for his comments about the NFL racial inequality protests as "unpresidential and divisive." In November 2017, Baker wrote an open letter to acting U.S. Secretary of Homeland Security Elaine Duke urging the Trump administration to continue to allow citizens of El Salvador, Haiti, and Honduras to stay in the U.S. under temporary protected status, and the next month, Baker and a bipartisan group of 11 other governors wrote an open letter to the leadership of the 115th U.S. Congress urging it to allow DACA recipients to stay in the U.S. as well.

Despite revisions to sanctuary status legislation proposed the previous year, Baker opposed a revised version of the legislation after it was submitted in the state legislature in February 2018, and the next May, he said he would veto the revised version of the legislation attached in the state legislature as an amendment to the 2019 fiscal year state budget. In June 2018, Baker directed the Massachusetts National Guard not to send any assets or personnel to the U.S.–Mexico border to assist the Trump administration in enforcing its "zero-tolerance policy" towards immigrants, citing the Trump Administration's family separation policy towards children as "cruel and inhumane."

In December 2018, Baker called for the suspension of a state district court judge who allegedly assisted an illegal immigrant in avoiding detention by an ICE agent during a legal proceeding from hearing further criminal cases until the federal investigation of the incident is concluded. In January 2019, he announced he would veto any bill that grants illegal immigrants driver's licenses.

In June 2020, Baker signed a law making Juneteenth an official state holiday.

In December 2020, Baker signed into law An Act Relative to Justice, Equity and Accountability in Law Enforcement in the Commonwealth, a bill created in response to Black Lives Matter protests calling for police reform across the country in the wake of the murder of George Floyd and the shooting of Breonna Taylor. He originally hesitated to sign the bill and sent it back to the legislature due to a provision that would create a civilian-led commission on police misconduct (six of its nine members would be civilians), saying, "I do not accept the premise that civilians know best how to train police". He also opposed the bill's ban on facial recognition technology. He signed the bill into law after compromising by limiting facial recognition technology, not banning it altogether.

==== Opioid epidemic ====
In February 2015, Baker announced the formation of a working group to write a report formulating a statewide strategy to address the opioid epidemic in Massachusetts, which was released in June 2015. In the same month of the report's release, the Massachusetts Department of Public Health began a public awareness campaign on opioid addiction, and Baker announced a $34.5 million proposal following the working group's recommendations that included a $5.8 million program to move civil commitments for substance abuse from state prisons to state hospitals operated by the Massachusetts Executive Office of Health and Human Services, with Baker himself saying, "Opioid addiction is a health care issue that knows no boundaries across age, race, class or demographics."

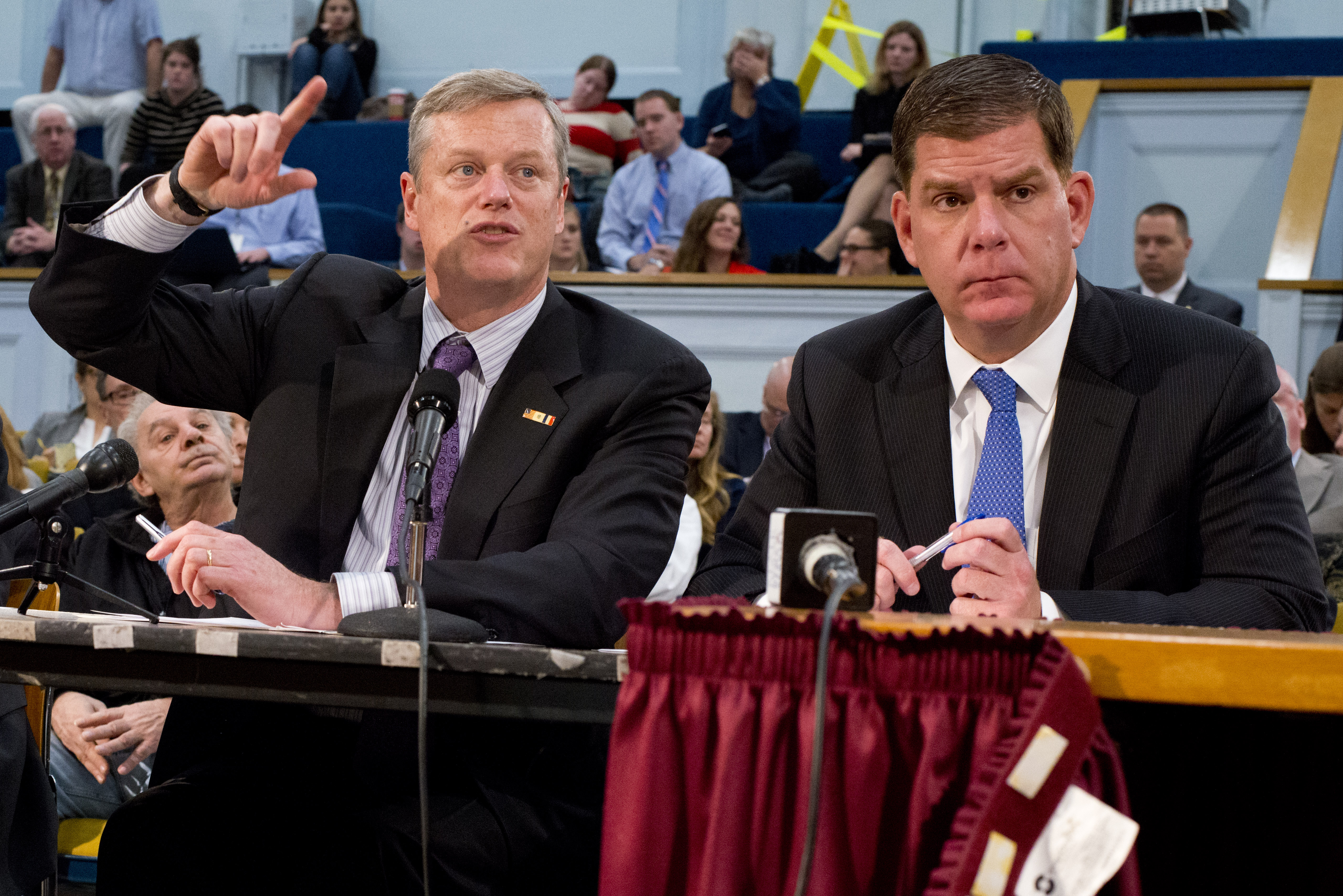
Baker (left) and Boston mayor Marty Walsh testifying before a joint committee of the state legislature in support of Baker's opioid epidemic legislation

In November 2015, Baker and Boston mayor Marty Walsh testified before the state legislature in support of the legislation, and the legislation received the endorsement of several Massachusetts county sheriffs, as well as Boston City Police Commissioner William B. Evans. In the same month, Baker announced a statewide anti-stigma media campaign to combat stereotypes about drug addiction, a core competencies program in prevention and management of prescription drug misuse at the state's medical schools, and signed into law a bill making fentanyl trafficking a crime.

In January 2016, Baker and into law a bill legally prohibiting the civil commitment of women for substance abuse to MCI Framingham and diverting those commitments to treatment centers, such as Taunton State Hospital. In February 2016, Baker announced $2.5 million in federal grants for opioid and heroin crime reduction to Massachusetts criminal justice agencies, as well as a core competencies program on prescription drug misuse at the state's dental schools, and Baker spoke in support of the Obama Administration's $1.1 billion proposal to expand access to treatment for drug addicts.

In March 2016, Baker spoke in support of new Centers for Disease Control opioid prescription guidelines, signed into law a bill repealing automatic driver's license suspensions for people convicted of drug crimes, and signed into law a compromise version of the comprehensive opioid legislation he proposed the previous October. In May 2016, Baker and Massachusetts Attorney General Maura Healey launched a statewide campaign to promote awareness of protection for people calling in drug overdoses under Good Samaritan laws. In June 2016, Baker met with the five other New England governors at a panel in Boston to coordinate reforms to address the opioid epidemic, such as setting limitations on opioid prescriptions, and the following month, Baker organized an interstate compact signed by 44 governors to agree adopting the same strategies for addressing the opioid epidemic modeled after the policies Baker has implemented in Massachusetts.

In August 2016, Baker launched an improved version of the state's prescription monitoring program and expanded the state's core competencies program in prevention and management of prescription drug misuse to advanced practice nursing and physician assistant programs, as well as to training programs for employees at community health centers, and the following month, Baker announced a statewide medication disposal program at Walgreens pharmacies. In December 2016, Baker announced a pilot workers' compensation program to provide alternative treatments to opioids for workers with settled claims for on-the-job injuries.

In February 2017, the Massachusetts Department of Public Health released data showing that estimated opioid-related deaths had increased to nearly 2,000 during 2016, after increasing from estimates of under 1,400 in 2014 and to under 1,800 in 2015. In March 2017, Baker was appointed to the Trump Administration's Opioid and Drug Abuse Commission chaired by New Jersey Governor Chris Christie, and in June 2017, Baker attended the commission's first meeting. In April 2017, Baker announced additional funding aid for criminal justice agencies on opioid and heroin abuse reduction programs in Massachusetts gateway cities and Massachusetts received $12 million in federal funding for its opioid epidemic policies. In August 2017, Baker proposed increasing penalties for illegal drug distribution of substances that lead to death to a maximum of life imprisonment and a mandatory minimum sentence of five years, equivalent to vehicular manslaughter while intoxicated, and the following month, Baker's administration announced a pilot treatment and diversion program with the Worcester Police Department for low-level substance misuse.

In October 2017, Baker's administration extended the core competencies program on prescription drug misuse at the state's medical and dental schools to the state's nine social work schools, Baker traveled to the National Academy of Medicine in Washington, D.C., to speak at a panel discussion about the opioid epidemic, and Baker spoke in support of the Trump Administration's declaration of the opioid epidemic as a national public health emergency and called on the administration to fully fund the proposals of the Opioid and Drug Abuse Commission that Baker served on. In November 2017, the commission released its final report, the Massachusetts Department of Public Health released data showing opioid overdose deaths in Massachusetts declined by 10 percent over the first nine months of 2017, and Baker proposed an overhaul to the reforms he signed into law in March 2016.

In January 2018, Baker announced that CVS was adding drug disposal boxes to 42 pharmacies across the state, and Baker also proposed a separate bill to reintroduce a proposal that had been removed from the opioid legislation Baker signed into law in March 2016 to allow hospitals to involuntarily hold addiction patients for 72 hours while attempting to place them in treatment. Also in January 2018, Baker and Massachusetts Secretary of Health and Human Services Marylou Sudders testified before the state legislature on the overhaul bill he proposed the previous November, and during his testimony, Baker expressed skepticism about the effectiveness of supervised injection sites.

In February 2018, the Massachusetts Department of Public Health released data showing that opioid overdose deaths in Massachusetts fell by eight percent in 2017, and the following May, the Massachusetts Department of Public Health released further data showing the number of opioid overdose deaths in Massachusetts during the first three months of 2018 was 5 percent lower than during the first three months of 2017. In May 2018, Baker's administration announced that it had received a $11.7 million federal grant for opioid addiction prevention, treatment, and recovery programs. The following month, Baker's administration awarded nearly $1 million in first responder naloxone grants to 33 police and fire departments, and Baker spoke in support of a lawsuit filed by Massachusetts Attorney General Maura Healey on behalf of 670 Massachusetts residents against OxyContin manufacturer Purdue Pharma.

In August 2018, Baker signed into law a second comprehensive opioid bill that expanded access to naloxone and addiction treatment and recovery centers, required all opioid prescribers to convert to secure electronic prescriptions by 2020, and created a commission to study the effectiveness of supervised injection sites, involuntary commitments, and the credentialing of recovery coaches. In the same month, the Massachusetts Department of Public Health released a report stating that fentanyl was present in nearly 90 percent of the opioid overdose deaths in the state that year. In September 2018, the U.S. Department of Health and Human Services announced that Massachusetts would receive $50 million in federal funding to expand access to substance abuse and mental health services in the state.

The following month, Baker announced a statewide standing order from the Massachusetts Department of Public Health to allow pharmacies in the state to start dispensing naloxone without a prescription, and Baker proposed a $5 million pilot program to coordinate efforts at fentanyl trafficking enforcement by local police departments. In November 2018, the Massachusetts Department of Public Health released estimates showing that opioid overdose deaths were 1.3 percent lower during the first nine months of 2018 than during first nine months of 2017, but that opioid-related emergency medical service (EMS) incidents increased by 12 percent.

== NCAA president ==
On December 15, 2022, the NCAA announced that Baker had been named the sixth president of the NCAA, effective March 2023. He replaced Mark Emmert, who announced his intent to retire. Emmert served as a consultant to the organization during the first few months of Baker's tenure before stepping aside permanently in June 2023. Baker became the first NCAA president to not be a college president or an athletic director since its inception. He was also the first NCAA president to not previously work for a power five conference, thus being NCAA's first outside-hire CEO.

In October 2023, Baker testified before the US Senate Judiciary Committee, lobbying for federal legislation on name, image, and likeness (NIL) deals that would standardize contracts, provide a national clearing house for oversight, and require agents to register with the federal government. He argued without intervention, NCAA Division II and Division III colleges are likely to convert their teams into club sports to avoid the costs of recruiting student athletes.

On December 17, 2024, in a US Senate hearing on sports betting, Baker got into a heated exchange about transgender athletes on college teams and in locker rooms with Sen. Josh Hawley (R-Mo.) and Sen. John Kennedy (R- La.).

== Personal life ==
Baker married Lauren Cardy Schadt, a Kellogg alumna, in 1987. Schadt had been working as an assistant account executive at a New York advertising agency. She is the daughter of James P. Schadt, the former CEO of Reader's Digest and Cadbury Schweppes Americas Beverages. After a career in advertising, she served as Board Chair and Director of Institutional Advancement at Marian Court College, which closed in 2015. They live in Swampscott, Massachusetts. They have three children, Charlie, Andrew ("A.J."), and Caroline.

Baker has weighed in on popular culture issues from time to time: in 2015, Boston magazine wrote a piece on his music preferences, stating that Baker "is shamelessly Top 40 in his tastes, stuck mostly in the classic rock that dominated radio of his teens and twenties, aka the 1970s and '80s" but holding "a deep knowledge and appreciation for the Ramones, Green Day, and the Dropkick Murphys." That same year, Baker, a lifelong Star Wars fan, admitted to not being a fan of the prequels nor the sequels to the original trilogy. In a 2022 interview with CNN's Jake Tapper, he credited David Bowie with predicting the negative role that Internet-based social media would have on politics.

On June 22, 2018, Baker's son Andrew "AJ" Baker was accused of sexually assaulting a woman on a JetBlue flight. The next week, Baker responded to questions about the incident and said his son would fully cooperate with the Massachusetts U.S. Attorney's Office's independent review of the matter. A.J. later settled a drunk-driving charge in Lynnfield, Massachusetts in May 2023.

== Electoral history ==
Massachusetts Gubernatorial Republican Primary Election, 2010
Party	Candidate	Votes	%
Republican	Charlie Baker	215,008	98.3
Republican	All others	2,179	1.0
Republican	Scott Lively (write-in)	1,021	0.5
Republican	Tim Cahill (write-in)	448	0.2

Massachusetts Gubernatorial Election, 2010
Party	Candidate	Votes	%
Democratic	Deval Patrick/Tim Murray (inc.)	1,112,283	48.4
Republican	Charlie Baker/Richard Tisei	964,866	42.0
Independent	Tim Cahill/Paul Loscocco	184,395	8.0
Green-Rainbow	Jill Stein/Richard Purcell	32,895	1.4
Write-ins	All others	2,601	0.1

Massachusetts Gubernatorial Republican Primary Election, 2014
Party	Candidate	Votes	%
Republican	Charlie Baker	116,004	74.1
Republican	Mark Fisher	40,240	25.7
Republican	All others	336	0.2

Massachusetts Gubernatorial Election, 2014
Party	Candidate	Votes	%
Republican	Charlie Baker/Karyn Polito	1,044,573	48.4
Democratic	Martha Coakley/Steve Kerrigan	1,004,408	46.5
United Independent	Evan Falchuk/Angus Jennings	71,814	3.3
Independent	Scott Lively/Shelly Saunders	19,378	0.9
Independent	Jeff McCormick/Tracy Post	16,295	0.8
Write-ins	All others	1,858	0.1

Massachusetts Gubernatorial Election, 2018
Party	Candidate	Votes	%
Republican	Charlie Baker/Karyn Polito (inc.)	1,781,341	66.60
Democratic	Jay Gonzalez/Quentin Palfrey	885,770	33.12
Write-ins	All others	7,504	0.28

Party political offices
Preceded by Kerry Healey	Republican nominee for Governor of Massachusetts; 2010, 2014, 2018	Succeeded by Geoff Diehl
Political offices
Preceded by Deval Patrick	Governor of Massachusetts; 2015–2023	Succeeded by Maura Healey
U.S. order of precedence (ceremonial)
Preceded by Deval Patrick as Former Governor	Order of precedence of the United States; Within Massachusetts	Succeeded by Jack Markell as Former Governor
Preceded by Deval Patrick as Former Governor	Order of precedence of the United States; Outside Massachusetts	Succeeded by Parris Glendening as Former Governor
