= Stephen Kurkjian =

American journalist and author

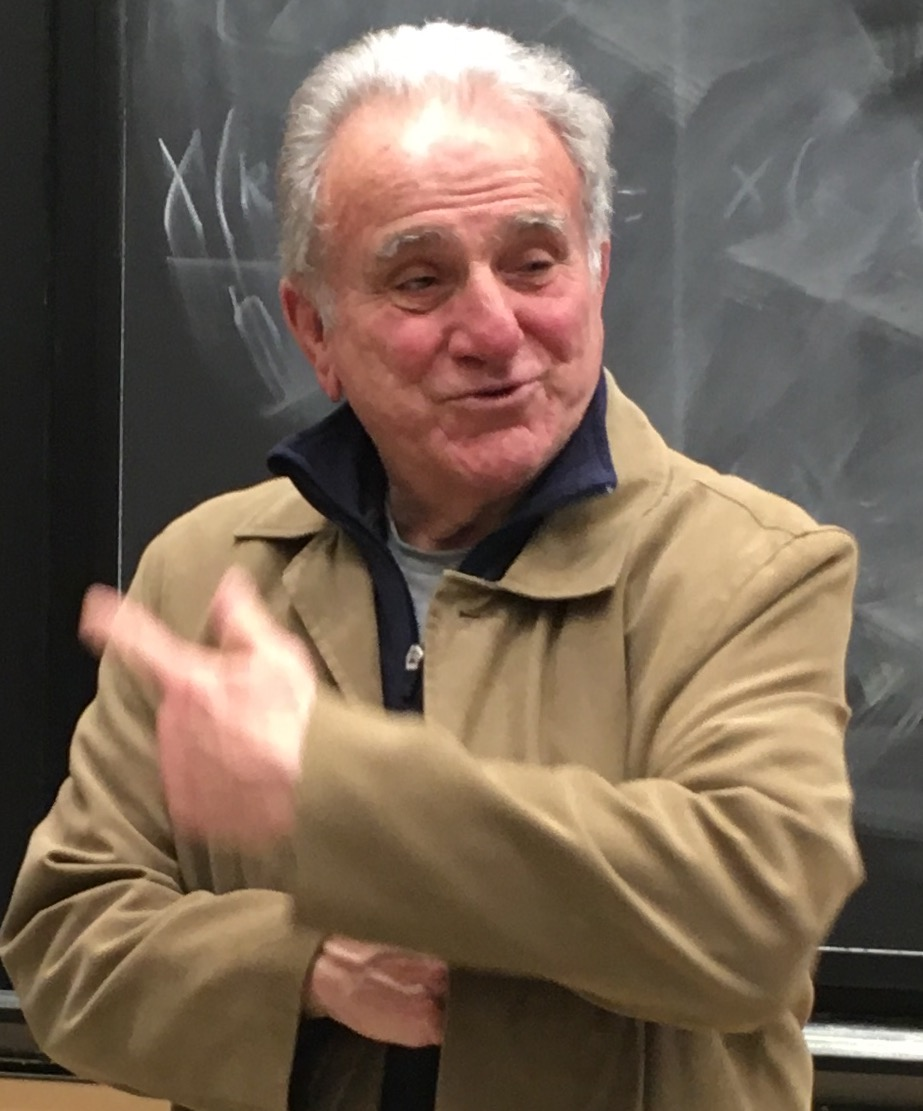
- Education: Boston Latin School
- Alma mater: Boston University; Suffolk University Law School
- Known for: Exposing the coverage of the Roman Catholic clergy sexual abuse scandal
- Relatives: Tim Kurkjian (cousin)
- Awards: • Pulitzer Prize • George Polk Award for National Reporting

Stephen A. Kurkjian is an American journalist and author. He received the Pulitzer Prize for Local Investigative Specialized Reporting in 1972 and 1980. Additionally, he contributed to The Boston Globe Spotlight Team's coverage of the clergy abuse scandal within the Roman Catholic Archdiocese of Boston that was awarded the Pulitzer Prize for Public Service in 2003. He also received the George Polk Award in 1982 and 1994. He won the Investigative Reporters and Editors Award in 1995.

== Life ==
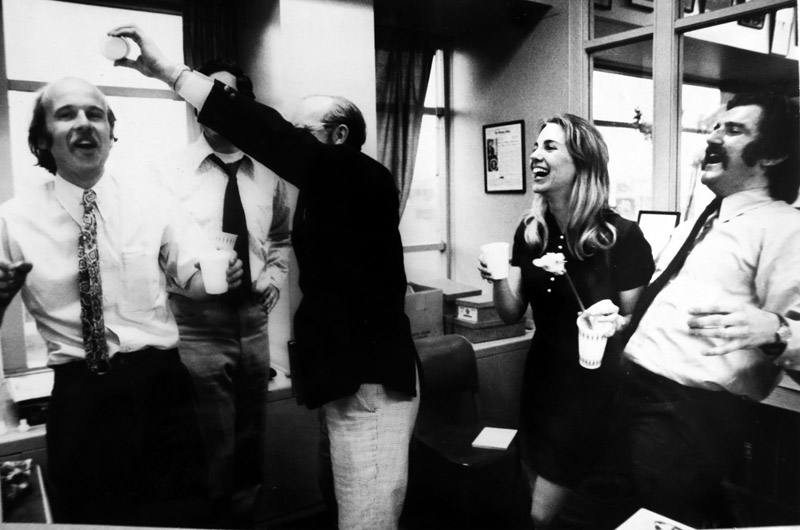
Kurkjian (right) and other members of the Spotlight team with Boston Globe editor Thomas Winship, celebrating their 1972 Pulitzer Prize in Local Investigative Specialized Reporting

Stephen Kurkjian is of Armenian descent. A lifelong Bostonian, he is a graduate of the Boston Latin School, Boston University (1966) and the Suffolk University School of Law (1970). Kurkjian attended the latter institution as a part-time student while working as a general assignment reporter for the State House News Service and the Globe and remains a member of the Massachusetts Bar. Along with former wife Ann Kurkjian Crane, he became a founding member of the Spotlight Team (now the oldest investigative journalism unit in the United States) in 1970; from 1979 to 1986, he served as the unit's editor. He also served as the newspaper's Washington bureau chief and senior assistant metropolitan editor for projects before retiring in 2007.

His father, an artist, was a survivor of the Armenian genocide of 1915. His cousin is sportswriter Tim Kurkjian.

== Peter J. Quinn investigation ==
In November 2005, Kurkjian contacted Massachusetts officials about conference trips made by the state's CIO, Peter J. Quinn. Kurkjian then wrote an article for the Globe suggesting a conflict of interest by Quinn. Conference organizers paid part of Quinn's trip expenses, and "a galaxy of computer companies are listed as sponsors of many of the conferences." The state investigated and cleared Quinn. He was in demand as a conference speaker because of his division's initiative to adopt for state documents the Open Document Format in place of Microsoft Office formats. After Quinn was exonerated, he resigned and said in an interview, "It was apparent from the questions that were coming from the Globe after the initial entry that things that had never occurred were being fed to the Globe to add more gasoline to the fire. In fairness to everyone close to me, it was time to say enough is enough."
