= Peter J. Quinn =

American information technology worker

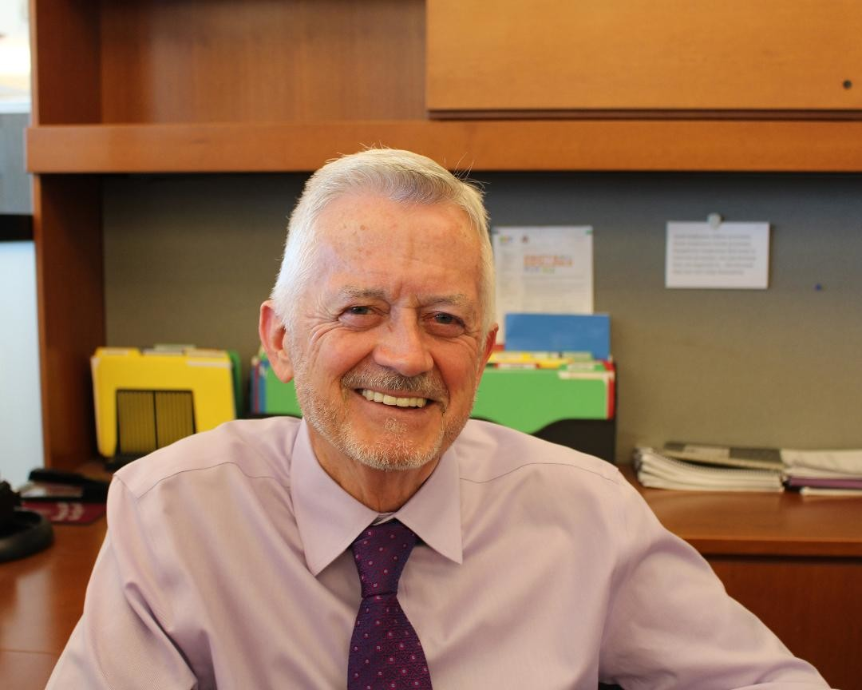
Quinn on 17 March 2019

Peter J. Quinn, an information technology (IT) worker, was chief information officer (CIO) of the Commonwealth of Massachusetts from September 2002 through January 2006. He is noted for his controversial support for OpenDocument, a standard format for office documents (ISO/IEC 26300).

Quinn established a requirement that all state government documents be formatted in OpenDocument (effective 2007). This created intense opposition from Microsoft, whose Office software uses proprietary formats and does not recognize OpenDocument files. Quinn was supported by his boss Eric Kriss and others. But he was also opposed in his efforts; for example by Massachusetts Secretary of the Commonwealth William F. Galvin. Furthermore, Stephen Kurkjian of the Boston Globe suggested that Quinn had a conflict of interest. He was a speaker at IT conferences that paid part of his trip expenses. Quinn was cleared of wrongdoing, but he has resigned, stating the following:

Over the last several months, we have been through some very difficult and tumultuous times. Many of these events have been very disruptive and harmful to my personal well being, my family and many of my closest friends. This is a burden I will no longer carry....I have become a lightning rod with regard to any IT initiative. Even the smallest initiatives are being mitigated or stopped by some of the most unlikely and often uninformed parties. The last thing I can let happen is my presence be the major contributing factor in marginalizing the good work of ITD and the entire IT community.

In an interview Quinn stated that "he hears Microsoft was the Boston Globe's source."

After leaving the CIO role in Massachusetts, Quinn landed a position in 2011 with the State of Ohio.

Quinn's career has been marked by further controversies, both in Ohio where he was a consultant employed by Advocate Solutions and New York where he served as a Department of Education Technology Chief.

The Ohio office of Inspector General Randall J. Meyer recommended Quinn be disbarred as the result of a 2017 investigation which found that top state information-technology officials improperly routed more than $17 million in overpriced, no-bid contracts, including to Advocate Solutions.

Upon learning of the Ohio inspector general's report accusing Quinn of conspiring to rig $469,000 worth of price-inflated IT contracts with that state’s Workers Compensation bureau when he worked there in 2015 the New York DOE suspended Quinn’s purchasing powers and launched its own probe. Quinn “resigned irrevocably by mutual agreement" from his role as a result.

Quinn is a graduate of Cambridge College.
