= Frederick Laskey =

Fred Laskey

Fomer director of the Massachusetts Water Resources Authority as of 2026
- Incumbent
- Assumed office 2001
- Preceded by: Douglas B. MacDonald

Secretary of Administration and Finance of Massachusetts
- In office September 1998 – March 1999
- Preceded by: Charlie Baker
- Succeeded by: Andrew Natsios

Personal details
- Education: UMass Boston (AB)

Frederick A. Laskey is a Massachusetts government official, who currently serves as the director of the Massachusetts Water Resources Authority, and previously served as the Secretary of Administration and Finance of Massachusetts from 1998 to 1999.

== Career ==
Before becoming the Secretary of Administration and Finance of Massachusetts in 1998, Laskey served as Senior Deputy Commissioner of the Massachusetts Department of Revenue from 1994 to 1998, and was designated by the Commissioner to serve as Assistant Secretary in the Executive Office for Administration and Finance.

== Personal life ==
Laskey holds a degree in political science and history, from University of Massachusetts at Boston.
