= Thomas Trimarco =

American politician & lawyer (born 1939)

Secretary of Administration and Finance of Massachusetts
- In office 2005–2007
- Preceded by: Eric Kriss
- Succeeded by: Leslie Kirwan

Personal details
- Born: April 1, 1939 (age 87) New York City, New York, U.S.
- Party: Republican
- Education: Dartmouth College; Boston College Law School

Thomas H. Trimarco (born April 1, 1939) is an American politician and lawyer who served as Massachusetts Secretary of Administration and Finance from 2005 to 2007. He is currently a senior vice president in the government relations division at O’Neill and Associates.

== Work for John A. Volpe ==
A graduate of Dartmouth College and Boston College Law School, Trimarco began his career in government service as assistant general counsel at the United States Department of Transportation in 1970. When Transportation Secretary John A. Volpe was named United States Ambassador to Italy, Trimarco joined him as a special assistant and embassy counsel.

== Return to the United States ==
When Volpe left office in 1977, Trimarco became a partner at the law firm of Csaplar & Bok. He also served as field coordinator for Edward Brooke's 1978 re-election campaign and co-chair of Howard Baker's 1980 presidential campaign.

In 1980, Trimarco served as Volpe's legal counsel while he appeared before the Ward Commission, which was investigating corruption in government projects.

== Congressional campaigns ==
That same year, Trimarco was a Republican candidate for the United States House of Representatives in Massachusetts's 6th congressional district. He ran as a fiscal conservative and social moderate. His campaign picked up the endorsements of party leaders including John Volpe, Francis W. Hatch, Jr., and Josiah Spaulding. Trimarco defeated William Bronson 51.2% to 48.8% in the Republican primary, but lost to incumbent Nicholas Mavroules 50.8% to 47.1% in the general election.

In 1981, Trimarco was a finalist for the position of United States Attorney for the District of Massachusetts, however William Weld was selected instead. It was believed that Trimarco had the backing of the White House, but was opposed by the Justice Department due to his association with John Volpe.

In 1982, Trimarco was considered by John Lakian, the Republican frontrunner for governor, to be his running mate. However, Trimarco was more interested in running against Mavroules again and declined.

Trimarco announced his candidacy for the 1982 Congressional election on June 6 at the Briarcliff Lodge in Lynn, Massachusetts. During his campaign, he supported President Ronald Reagan's economic program, but opposed his plan to reduce Social Security benefits and cut student loans. He promised "not be bound by the dictates of any one President". He lost to Mavroules 57.8% to 42.2% in the general election.

In 1988, Trimarco served as co-chair of Bob Dole's presidential campaign in Massachusetts.

== Massachusetts State Treasurer's office ==
In 1990, Trimarco served as co-chairman and policy director for Joe Malone's campaign for Treasurer and Receiver-General of Massachusetts. After Malone won he named Trimarco First Deputy Treasurer of the Commonwealth of Massachusetts. In this capacity, he acted as the Chairman-designee of the Massachusetts Pension Reserve Investment Management Board and the State Board of Retirement. He resigned in 1998 following the election of Shannon O'Brien to the Treasurer's office.

== Romney administration ==
In 2004, Trimarco was appointed by Governor Mitt Romney to serve on the Springfield Finance Control Board, a five-person board responsible for restoring stability to Springfield, Massachusetts' finances. During his tenure on the board, Springfield's deficit was reduced from more than $40 million to less than $10 million.

On July 7, 2005 Trimarco was appointed Massachusetts Secretary of Administration and Finance. In this position oversaw the Commonwealth's $25 billion budget and its capital spending program. He also played an important role in the passage of the Massachusetts health care reform law and served as chairman ex officio of the Commonwealth Health Insurance Connector Authority, which was given broad powers to implement and oversee the law.

Romney also appointed Trimarco to the Massachusetts Turnpike Commission.

== O'Neill and Associates ==
On April 2, 2007, Trimarco was named senior vice president at O'Neill and Associates, a government and public relations firm run by former Massachusetts Lieutenant Governor Thomas P. O'Neill III.
