= Thomas W. White (Massachusetts politician) =

American politician (1876–1959)

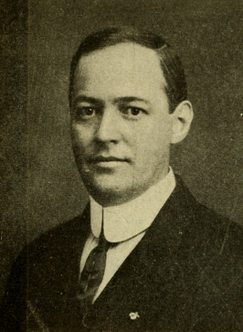

Collector of Internal Revenue for Massachusetts
- In office 1925–1933
- Preceded by: Malcolm Nichols
- Succeeded by: Joseph P. Carney

Chairman of the Massachusetts Commission of Administration and Finance
- In office 1924–1925
- Preceded by: Homer Loring
- Succeeded by: Charles P. Howard

Member of the Massachusetts House of Representatives for the 4th Middlesex district
- In office 1910–1914

Personal details
- Born: January 10, 1876 Newton, Massachusetts
- Died: August 12, 1959 (aged 83) Newton, Massachusetts
- Party: Republican
- Education: Massachusetts College of Pharmacy
- Occupation: Druggist

Thomas W. White (January 10, 1876 – August 12, 1959) was an American politician, aide, and campaign manager in Massachusetts.

== Early life ==
White was born on January 10, 1876, in Newton, Massachusetts. He attended Newton Public Schools and the Massachusetts College of Pharmacy and worked as a druggist.

== Career ==
White was a member of the Massachusetts House of Representatives from 1910 to 1914. He was chairman of the House Ways and Means Committee during his final term. In 1915, he was appointed to the state's commission of economy and efficiency. In 1916, he was appointed Massachusetts' first deputy supervisor of administration. In 1922, the office of supervisor of administration was replaced by the Commission of Administration and Finance. White was appointed to a seat on the commission and given the position of commissioner of personnel and standardization. In 1924, White was appointed chairman of the board and budget commissioner.

White was a personal friend of U.S. President Calvin Coolidge. They first met during the 1911 Massachusetts gubernatorial election when both men campaigned for Louis A. Frothingham and later served in the state legislature together. During the 1924 Republican Party presidential primaries, White managed Coolidge's campaign in Massachusetts. After Malcolm Nichols won the 1925 Boston mayoral election, Coolidge appointed White to succeed Nicholas as the state's Collector of Internal Revenue. He was sworn in on November 30, 1925. He remained in office until 1933, when President Franklin D. Roosevelt chose not to reappoint him.

White managed Henry Cabot Lodge Jr.'s 1936 campaign for the United States Senate and Leverett Saltonstall's 1938 gubernatorial campaign. He served as Lodge's secretary from 1937 to 1941.

In addition to his work at the state level, White also served nine years on the Newton board of aldermen. In 1933, he challenged incumbent Mayor Sinclair Weeks, but was defeated by a 2 to 1 margin.

== Later life and death ==
In 1944, White purchased an interest in the Wonderland Greyhound Park. It was alleged that the track had sold the shares to White at below market value in order to gain influence with Governor Saltonstall. However, in a 1948 decision, Judge Frank J. Donahue found that the purchase price was not "grossly inadequate". White died on August 12, 1959, at his home in Newton Upper Falls. He was predeceased by his wife, the former Susan C. Page.
