= David Forsberg =

American government official

Secretary of Health and Human Services of Massachusetts
- In office 1991 – October 1992
- Preceded by: Philip W. Johnston
- Succeeded by: Charlie Baker

Chairman of the Massachusetts Turnpike Authority
- In office April, 2000 – February 6, 2002

Personal details
- Party: Republican
- Education: Bowdoin College (AB); Boston University (MUP)

David P. Forsberg is a former American government official, who previously served as the New England Regional Administrator-Regional Housing Commissioner for the United States Department of Housing and Urban Development in 1989, then served as Secretary of Health and Human Services of Massachusetts from 1991 to 1992.

== Career ==
After serving as the New England Regional Administrator-Regional Housing Commissioner for the United States Department of Housing and Urban Development, and as Secretary of Health and Human Services of Massachusetts he went on to become the dean of the Anna Maria College of the School of Business. During the 2014 Massachusetts gubernatorial election, Forsberg served as the chairman of Charlie Baker's campaign.
