= James Humphrey Hustis Sr. =

American railroad executive

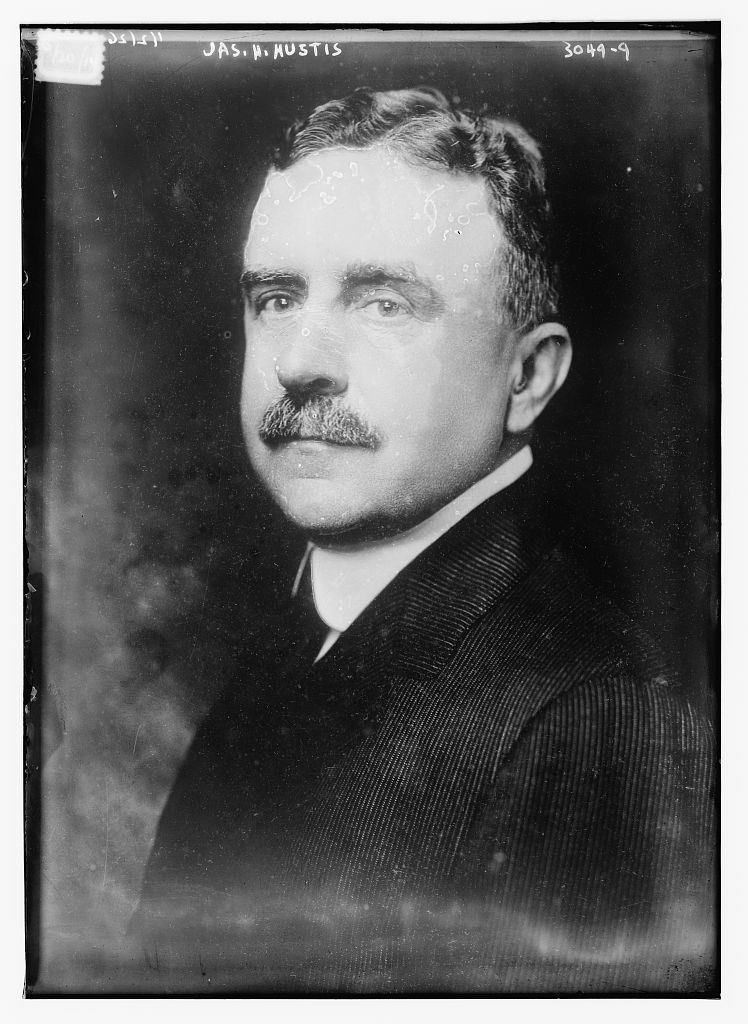

James Humphrey Hustis Sr. (January 11, 1864 - September 18, 1942) was an American railroad executive.

He was born in New York City in 1864. At the age of 14, he began working for the New York Central Railroad at Grand Central Station. He worked in various other positions at the railroad, becoming Superintendent of the Harlem Division in 1900 and General Superintendent in 1907. In 1911 he was appointed Vice President of the Boston and Albany Railroad, which was part of the New York Central system.

He was President of the New Haven Railroad during 1913-1914, and then President of the Boston and Maine Railroad from 1914 to 1926. In 1927 he was President of Schenectady Railways, an interurban line. In 1929 he was appointed Vice President at New York Central.

Hustis died in White Plains, New York in 1942.

== See also ==
- List of railroad executives

Business positions
Preceded by Maurice McDonald	President of the Boston and Maine Railroad; 1914–1926	Succeeded by George Hannauer
