= George Hannauer =

American businessman

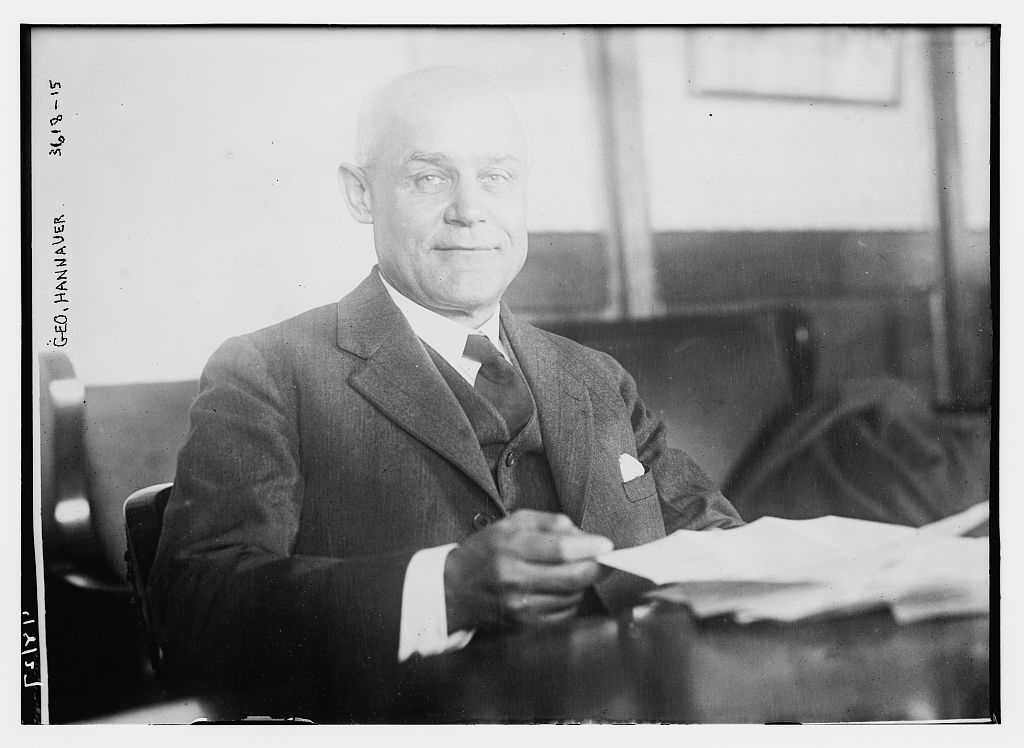
George Hannauer circa 1915

George A. Hannauer (December 19, 1872 – November 2, 1929) was the president of the Boston and Maine Railroad.

He was born in St. Louis, Missouri. He died in New Haven, Connecticut, of a heart attack while attending the Yale-Dartmouth football game.

Business positions
Preceded by James Humphrey Hustis, Sr.	President of the Boston and Maine Railroad; 1926–1929	Succeeded by Edward S. French
