= Eric Kriss =

American politician

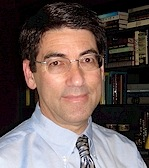

Secretary of Administration and Finance of Massachusetts
- In office 2003–2005
- Governor: Mitt Romney
- Preceded by: Kevin Sullivan
- Succeeded by: Thomas Trimarco

Personal details
- Born: 1949 (age 76–77)
- Education: Amherst College, BA 1971, University of Chicago, MBA 1979
- Profession: Business executive

Eric Arthur Kriss (born 1949) is an American business executive. He served as Secretary of Administration and Finance of Massachusetts in Governor Mitt Romney's cabinet (January 2003 – October 2005), and previously as Assistant Secretary of Administration and Finance of Massachusetts under Governor William Weld (January 1991 – February 1993).

He was a co-founder of Bain Capital, the founder and CEO of MediVision, the CEO of MediQual Systems, and also founded Workmode and Kriss Motors. He taught at the Herbert Business School of the University of Miami.

During the 1970s he was professionally involved in the music industry.

== Early life and education ==
Kriss grew up in California. He earned a bachelor of arts degree from Amherst College in 1971 and his MBA from University of Chicago, in 1979.

== Musical career ==
In 1976, Kriss played piano on two tracks of Mike Bloomfield's If You Love These Blues, Play 'Em As You Please, and produced the album, which was nominated for a Grammy Award.

In the mid-1970s Kriss launched the instructional-book and record division of Guitar Player magazine. In 1976 he co-founded Inner City Records, which was voted the Record Label of the Year in the 1979 International Jazz Critics Poll.

During the 1970s Kriss also wrote several books on music, including Beginning Blues Piano (1970), Barrelhouse and Boogie Piano (1973), and Six Blues-Roots Pianists (1973).

== Business career ==
In 1983 Kriss founded and was CEO of MediVision, a network of eye surgery centers.

In 1984, Kriss helped launch Bain Capital, which managed approximately $180 billion in assets as of 2024.

Between 1993 and 1998 he served as CEO of MediQual Systems, a healthcare information company that was sold to Cardinal Health.

In 1998, he founded Workmode, a website development company.

In 2010, Kriss became the first entrepreneur-in-residence at the Herbert Business School of the University of Miami, tasked with advising students, talking to classes, participating in seminars, and assisting with business plans. By 2010, he had also created Kriss Motors, a company devoted to building and restoring cars, including conversion of some vehicles from combustion to electric engines.

== Political career ==
Kriss served as Assistant Secretary of Administration and Finance of Massachusetts under Governor William Weld from January 1991 to February 1993. He served as Secretary of Administration and Finance of Massachusetts in Governor Mitt Romney's cabinet from January 2003 to October 2005.

=== Municipal turnarounds ===
In September 1991, the Massachusetts state legislature approved Governor William Weld's emergency request to appoint a state receiver to take over the City of Chelsea's bankrupt municipal government, the first Massachusetts city to be put into state receivership since the Great Depression. Weld named Jim Carlin, a businessman and former state Secretary of Transportation, to become the Chelsea receiver, reporting to Kriss, who, as the assistant Secretary of Administration and Finance of Massachusetts, had helped draft the legislation that put Chelsea into receivership.

Chelsea, directly across the Mystic River from Boston, had long been in economic decline with a spiraling fiscal crisis. Carlin and Kriss immediately undertook a broad municipal turnaround, with a focus on labor negotiations with the local firefighters union. Boston University had taken over local school administration in 1989.

Within two years, Chelsea's budget was balanced, a restructured firefighters contract was negotiated, city operations were streamlined, and new school construction was underway. As the receivership achieved stability, a charter change in 1995 implemented a new efficient council-manager form of government. Increased emphasis on economic development and capital improvement led to an influx of new business, and, as the turnaround reached maturity in 1998, Chelsea was named an All-American City by the National Civic League.

In 2004, Springfield, the third largest city in Massachusetts and long suffering from economic decline, requested extraordinary state assistance to meet its financial obligations. Kriss, now Secretary of Administration and Finance of Massachusetts under Governor Mitt Romney, drafted a new receivership bill, modeled after his 1991 Chelsea legislation, that expanded upon the receiver's powers by suspending Chapter 150E, a key law that enfranchised public sector unions and defined the collective bargaining process in Massachusetts. After heated debate and intensive lobbying by public labor unions, the legislature placed Springfield into a state receivership controlled by Secretary Kriss in mid 2004, but without the proposed suspension of the Chapter 150E labor law.

Without the Chapter 150E suspension, the state receivership entered into a long collective bargaining process with the teachers' union. In September 2006 agreement was finally reached on a new contract that included merit pay, the first time that student performance was explicitly tied to teacher compensation in a large urban school district in Massachusetts.

The Springfield receivership, as in the earlier Chelsea experience, balanced the municipal budget, streamlined operations, and earned an upgrade in the city's bond rating. On June 30, 2009, the receivership returned governance of the city to local officials.

In February 2004, Kriss had advocated the elimination of the monopoly granted to public sector unions through state laws such as Chapter 150E in Massachusetts. These remarks, plus the controversy over the original Kriss draft of the Springfield receivership legislation that suspended Chapter 150E, motivated Harvard University's John F. Kennedy School of Government to host a debate between Secretary Kriss and two labor union supporters, economics professor Richard B. Freeman, co-faculty director of the Harvard University Trade Union Program, and Jack Donahue, a Kennedy School lecturer and director of the Weil Program in Collaborative Governance.

When he left office in September 2005, Kriss warned that overly generous contracts with public employees, together with a failure to control employee healthcare costs and an aversion to development that could spur new tax revenue, have doomed cities and towns to a dark financial future.

=== Open formats ===
In early 2005, Kriss advocated using open formats in public records, stating in a Massachusetts Software Council meeting "It is an overriding imperative of the American democratic system that we cannot have our public documents locked up in some kind of proprietary format, perhaps unreadable in the future, or subject to a proprietary system license that restricts access."

At a September 16, 2005 meeting with the Mass Technology Leadership Council, Kriss raised state sovereignty as the overriding issue surrounding public records. While supporting the principle of private intellectual property rights, he said sovereignty trumped any private company's attempt to control the state's public records through claims of intellectual property.

Subsequently, in September 2005, Massachusetts became the first state to formally endorse OpenDocument formats for its public records and, at the same time, reject proprietary formats such those used in Microsoft's Office software suite.

=== Massachusetts Turnpike ===
In August 2006, Governor Romney and the Massachusetts Turnpike Authority board asked Kriss to lead a comprehensive review of the Turnpike following the ouster of Chairman Matthew J. Amorello and the collapse of a portion of the roof of the Ted Williams Tunnel. On October 19, 2006, Kriss recommended to the board that all tolls, except on the tunnels leading to Logan International Airport, be eliminated. The Massachusetts Turnpike Authority board then voted to effectively remove tolls west of the 128 toll plaza by June 30, 2007, the first step in dismantling the Authority's original mission begun in 1952.

In June 2009, Governor Deval Patrick signed legislation to formally end the Turnpike as a stand-alone authority on November 1, 2009.

== See also ==
- Adoption of Open Document format in Massachusetts
