= Governorship of Charlie Baker =

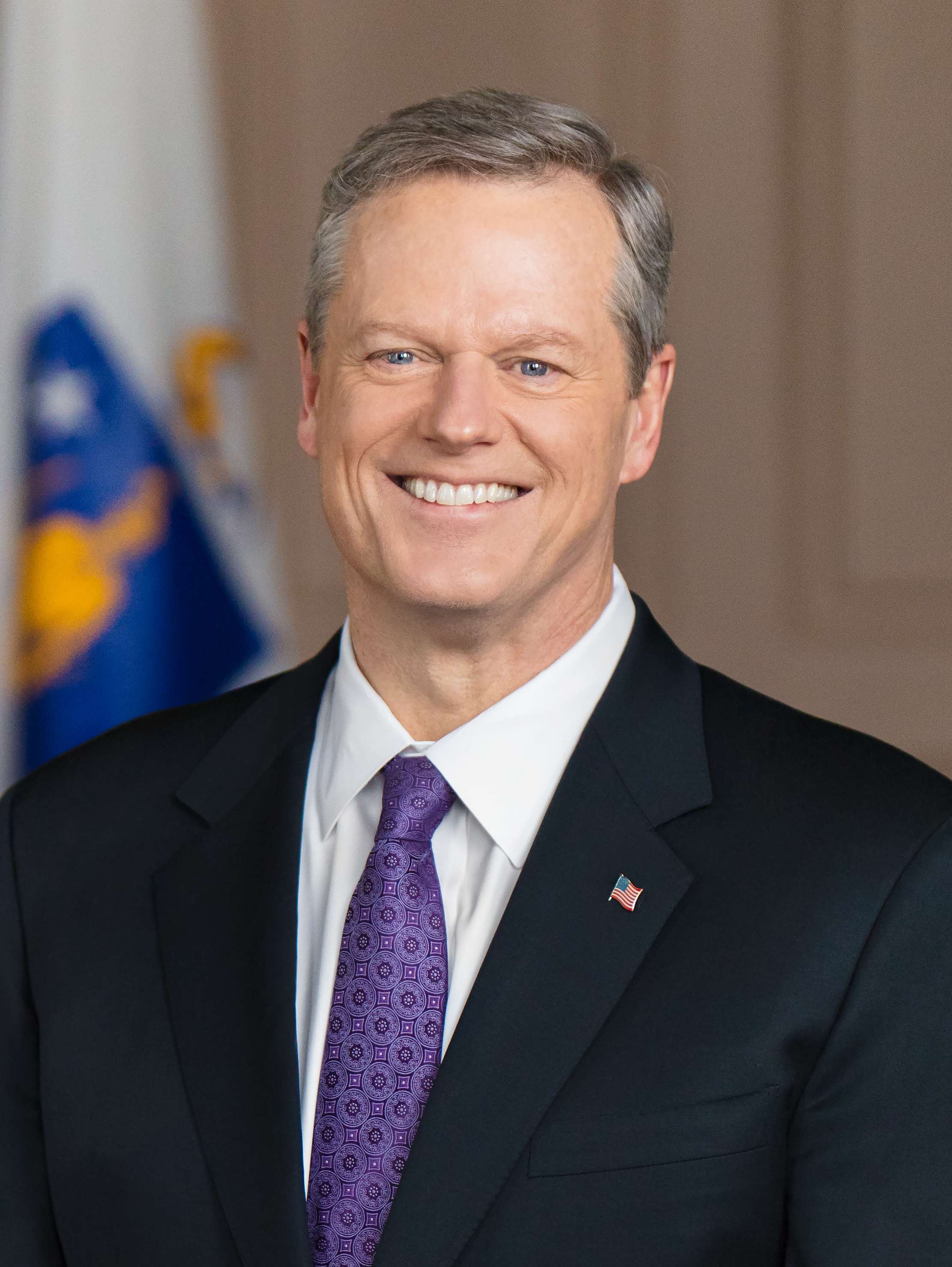
- Official portrait, 2018
- Governorship of Charlie Baker; January 8, 2015 – January 5, 2023
- Governor: Charlie Baker
- Party: Republican
- Election: 2014, 2018
- Seal of Massachusetts

Charlie Baker, a member of the Republican Party, served as the 72nd governor of Massachusetts from January 8, 2015, until January 5, 2023. Baker was considered a liberal or moderate Republican. During his governorship, Baker regularly had one of the highest approval ratings among incumbent U.S. governors.

== Baker's politics ==
Baker is considered a liberal or moderate Republican and was a frequent critic of Donald Trump, a Republican who served as president of the United States for a portion of Baker's governorship. Baker supported the impeachment inquiry into Donald Trump that began in September 2019. After the January 6 United States Capitol attack, Baker called for Trump to be removed from office. On January 3, 2023, Baker delivered his farewell address from the Massachusetts State House.

== Gubernatorial elections ==
=== Unsuccessful 2010 campaign ===
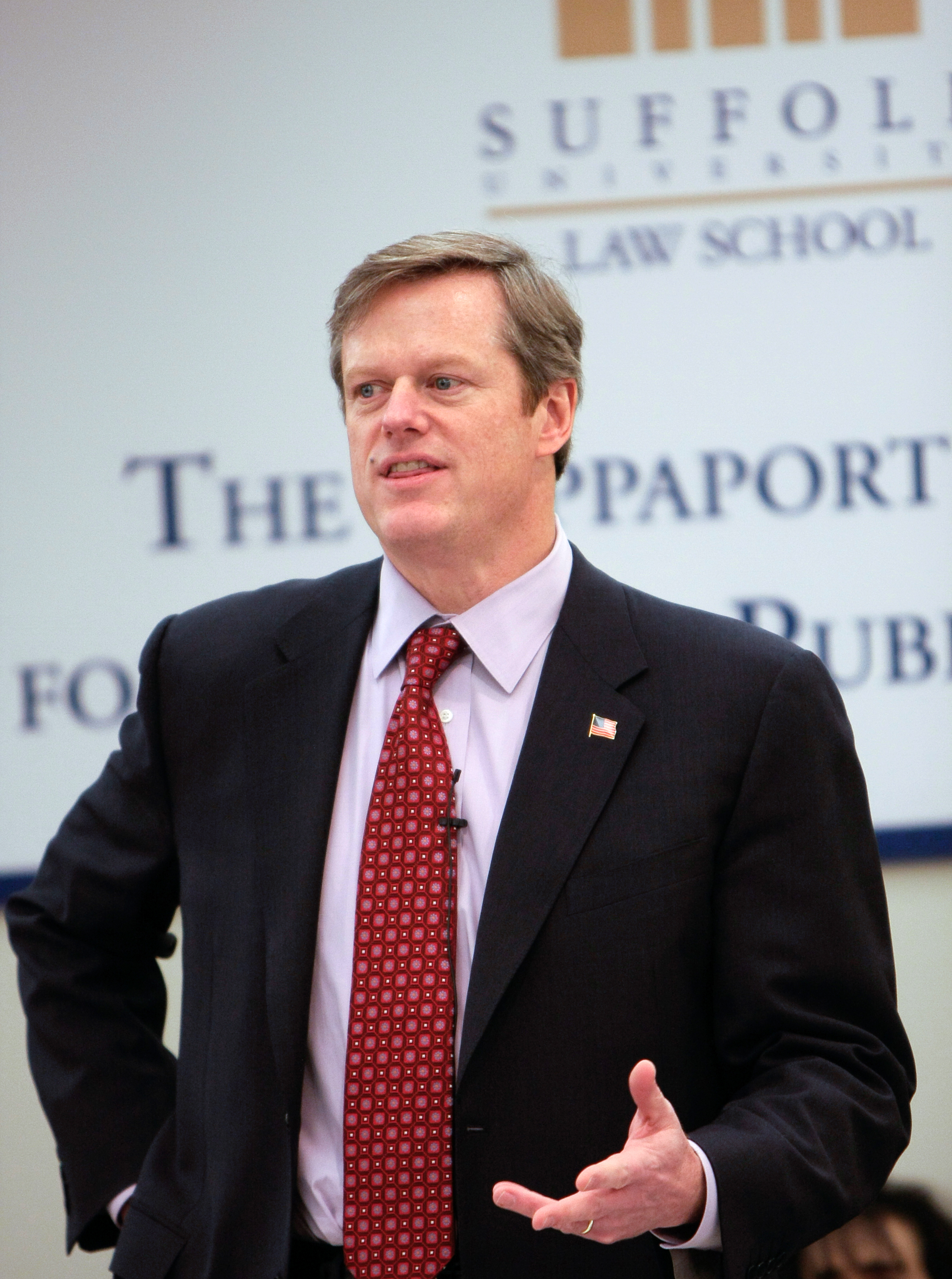
Baker at the Rappaport Center for Law and Public Policy at Suffolk University Law School on February 4, 2010.

In 2009 Baker was again rumored to be a contender for the Massachusetts gubernatorial election. Former Governor Weld strongly encouraged him to run, calling him "the heart and soul of the Weld–Cellucci administration." On July 8, 2009, Baker announced his candidacy, and on July 17 he stepped down from his position at Harvard Pilgrim Health Care. His campaign formally began on January 30, 2010. His opponents were Democratic incumbent Deval Patrick, Green-Rainbow candidate Jill Stein, and an independent, state treasurer and Receiver General Tim Cahill. For his running mate, Baker chose Senate minority leader Richard R. Tisei. At the state Republican Convention on April 17, 2010, Baker won the Republican nomination over former Independent candidate Christy Mihos with 89% of the delegate vote, thus avoiding a primary fight with Mihos.

Baker ran as a social liberal (in favor of gay marriage and abortion rights) and a fiscal conservative, stressing job creation as his primary focus. He reinforced his socially liberal position by selecting as his running mate Richard Tisei, an openly gay Republican who had supported same-sex marriage legalization efforts in Massachusetts. Baker's campaign centered on "Baker's Dozen," a plan outlining 13 areas of state government reform, which included consolidation of government, welfare reform, and restructuring of public employee pension and retirement benefits that Baker claimed would lower state expenditures by over $1 billion. A former member of the Massachusetts Board of Education, Baker advocated more charter, magnet, and alternative schools. Believing that education is a "civil right," he also aimed to close the educational achievement gap among underprivileged and minority students. At a town hall meeting in Chilmark, Massachusetts, on Martha's Vineyard, Baker voiced his opposition to the proposed Cape Wind project supported by Governor Patrick.

Baker ran against Patrick in an atmosphere of voter discontent, with a slow economy and high unemployment, which he used to his advantage during the campaign. Patrick, facing low approval ratings, criticized Baker for his role in the Big Dig financing plan, and for raising health premiums while head of Harvard Pilgrim. Despite an anti-incumbent mood among voters, Baker lost the November 2 general election with 42% of the vote to Patrick's 48%. "We fought the good fight," said Baker in his concession speech. "We have no cause to hang our heads and will be stronger for having fought this one."

After the 2010 election, Baker was named an executive in residence at General Catalyst Partners and a member of the board of directors at the Tremont Credit Union.

=== 2014 ===
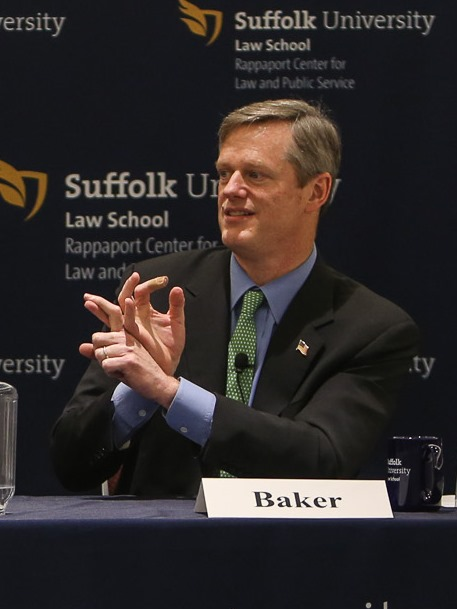
Baker at the Rappaport Center again on February 4, 2014.

On September 4, 2013, Baker announced that he would run for governor again in 2014 when incumbent governor Deval Patrick retired. On November 25, 2013, Mark Fisher, a businessman and Tea Party member announced that he would run against Baker in the Republican primary. In December 2013, Baker chose as his running mate Karyn Polito, a former opponent of same-sex marriage who had come to support marriage equality.

At the Republican State Convention on March 22, 2014, Baker received 2,095 votes (82.708%) and Fisher 374 (14.765%). There were 64 blank votes (2.527%). The threshold for making the ballot is 15% and the party announced that Baker had thus received the nomination without the need for a primary election. But Fisher argued that according to the Convention Rules, blank votes are not counted for the purposes of determining the winner and that he thus received 15.148%, enough to make the ballot. He sued the Massachusetts Republican State Committee and was certified for the primary ballot after a lengthy battle. In the September 9 primary election, Baker defeated Fisher with 74% of the vote.

In July 2014, Democrats criticized Baker for refusing to say whether he supported a provision in the new gun control law that gave police chiefs discretion to deny firearms identification cards, which are required to purchase shotguns and rifles. He later said in a debate that he would have signed the gun control bill as it was signed by Governor Patrick.

On October 27, 2014, The Boston Globe announced that it was endorsing Baker, the first time in 20 years that the paper had supported a Republican candidate for governor. "One needn't agree with every last one of Baker's views to conclude that, at this time, the Republican nominee would provide the best counterpoint to the instincts of an overwhelmingly Democratic Legislature," the endorsement reads. The newspaper also supported Baker because it claimed he would be the better candidate to "consolidate" Patrick's legacy on reforms tied to education, health care and public transportation.

On October 29, 2014, controversy arose over a story that Baker told the previous night about a fisherman and his two sons in New Bedford. In the following days, The Boston Globe and The Standard-Times were unable to find the fisherman. A professor from Northeastern University claimed the story, which Baker claims occurred in 2009, could have been a false memory. Democratic nominee Martha Coakley seized on the moment to attack Baker, and visited New Bedford to meet with fishing industry leaders.

After polls closed on election night, preliminary results showed that Baker had won the election. Later in the morning, Coakley conceded. The final election tally showed Baker with 48.5% of the vote to Coakley's 46.6%.

=== 2018 ===
Heading into the 2018 election, Baker had been consistently rated as one of the most popular governors in the country.

He was challenged in the Republican primary by Scott Lively, an evangelical pastor, who received enough votes at the state convention to qualify for ballot access. However, Baker easily fended off this challenge, receiving nearly 70% of the vote in the Republican primary on September 4, 2018. Lively filed a lawsuit against Baker and the state Republican Party alleging they violated neutrality rules during the campaign. Superior Court Judge Susan Sullivan dismissed all claims brought by Lively on June 25, 2019.

In the general election, Baker faced Jay Gonzalez, a private health insurance executive who also served under Governor Deval Patrick as Secretary of Administration and Finance of Massachusetts. Gonzalez suffered from low name recognition throughout the campaign and polls indicated that Baker would receive a majority of the vote from registered Democrats in the state. Baker was reelected in a landslide with 67% of the vote and the highest vote total in the history of Massachusetts gubernatorial elections. This was also the best performance by a Massachusetts Republican governor since Bill Weld's reelection in 1994.

== Approval ratings ==
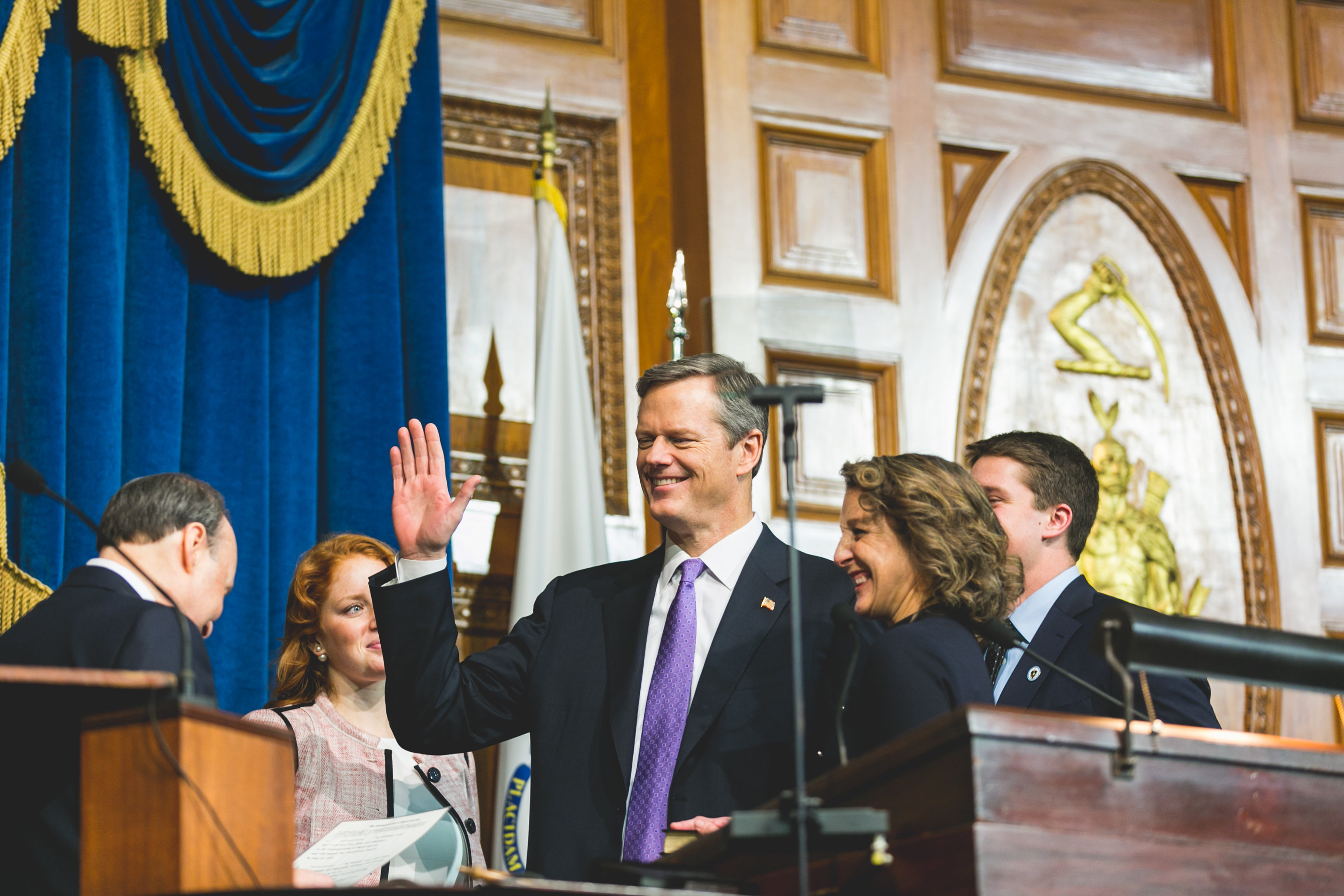
Baker taking his oath of office during his first gubernatorial inauguration ceremony

Nonpartisan polls consistently found Baker to be among the nation's most popular governors.

Job Approval

Polling group	Date	Approval	Disapproval	Unsure
Western New England University	April 6–14, 2015	63%	10%	27%
Suffolk University	April 16–21, 2015	70%	6%	23%
Morning Consult	May–November 2015	74%	14%	12%
Western New England University	November 8–15, 2015	72%	12%	16%
Suffolk University	November 18–22, 2015	70%	12%	17%
Morning Consult	January–May 2016	72%	16%	12%
Suffolk University	May 2–5, 2016	71%	11%	17%
Morning Consult	May–September 2016	70%	18%	12%
UMass Amherst/WBZ-TV	September 15–20, 2016	63%	23%	15%
Suffolk University/The Boston Globe	October 24–26, 2016	69%	10%	19%
Morning Consult	January–March 2017	75%	17%	8%
Morning Consult	April 1 – July 10, 2017	71%	17%	12%
Morning Consult	July 1 – September 30, 2017	69%	17%	14%
Morning Consult	October 1 – December 31, 2017	69%	16%	15%
Western New England University	October 24 – November 7, 2017	68%	13%	19%
WBUR/MassINC	January 5–7, 2018	74%	13%	13%
Morning Consult	January 1 – March 31, 2018	71%	16%	13%
Suffolk University/The Boston Globe	June 8–12, 2018	60%	19%	21%
Morning Consult	April 1 – June 30, 2018	69%	17%	14%
Suffolk University/The Boston Globe	September 13–17, 2018	72%	18%	10%
Morning Consult	July 1 – September 25, 2018	70%	17%	13%
Western New England University	October 10 – 27, 2018	67%	15%	18%
Suffolk University/The Boston Globe	October 24–27, 2018	73%	16%	11%
Morning Consult	October 1 – December 31, 2018	72%	14%	15%
Morning Consult	January 1 – March 31, 2019	73%	14%	13%
Morning Consult	April 1 – June 30, 2019	73%	14%	13%
Morning Consult	July 1 – September 30, 2019	73%	16%	11%
Morning Consult	October 1 – December 31, 2019	69%	19%	12%
Suffolk University/The Boston Globe	March 24–27, 2020	80%	13%	7%

Favorability

Polling group	Date	Favorable	Unfavorable	Unsure
Western New England University	April 6–14, 2015	56%	13%	31%
Suffolk University	April 16–21, 2015	74%	8%	18%
WBUR/MassINC	June 4–6, 2015	69%	10%	17%
WBUR/MassINC	July 6–8, 2015	64%	14%	18%
Suffolk University	November 18–22, 2015	70%	15%	12%
Suffolk University	May 2–5, 2016	66%	12%	17%
WBUR/MassINC	September 7–10, 2016	62%	16%	17%
UMass Amherst/WBZ-TV	September 15–20, 2016	63%	24%	14%
WBUR/MassINC	October 13–16, 2016	55%	17%	22%
Suffolk University/The Boston Globe	October 24–26, 2016	64%	12%	18%
WBUR/MassINC	January 15–17, 2017	59%	18%	20%
WBUR/MassINC	June 19–22, 2017	64%	15%	18%
WBUR/MassINC	November 9–12, 2017	67%	14%	19%
WBUR/MassINC	January 5–7, 2018	66%	17%	17%
WBUR/MassINC	March 16–18, 2018	66%	14%	20%
WBUR/MassINC	May 22–26, 2018	67%	9%	23%
Suffolk University/The Boston Globe	June 8–12, 2018	64%	18%	18%
Suffolk University/The Boston Globe	September 13–17, 2018	73%	17%	10%
WBUR/MassINC	September 17–21, 2018	74%	14%	12%
UMass Lowell/The Boston Globe	October 1–7, 2018	78%	12%	10%
Suffolk University/The Boston Globe	October 24–27, 2018	73%	15%	12%
WBUR/MassINC	October 25–28, 2018	71%	17%	12%
WBUR/MassINC	May 9–13, 2019	66%	15%	19%
WBUR/MassINC	July 17–20, 2020	77%	16%	7%

In July 2016, the market research firm Gravis Marketing conducting a poll on ballot questions and state politics for Jobs First, a conservative political action committee, found Baker having a two-thirds favorability rating.

A January 2018 WBUR/MassINC poll gave Baker a 74% approval rating, making him the most popular governor in the United States.

== Economic policy ==
At the start of his governorship, Baker's launched the Community Compact Program run by the Community Compact Cabinet. The program saw the state providing funding to "best practice" programs in communities. At the end of Walsh's governorship, Sean Cronin (deputy commissioner of the Massachusetts Division of Local Services) claimed that his Community Compact Cabinet had distributed 1,400 grants amounting to $65 million.

In August 2016, Baker signed into a municipal finance modernization bill that he had first proposed the previous December. In January 2016, Baker proposed a five-year, $918 million economic development bill that he would sign into law the following August.

In December 2016, Baker's administration undertook an economic development mission in Israel. During the mission, Baker signed an agreement with Israeli Chief Scientist Avi Hasson to foster research and development cooperation between the Massachusetts and Israeli governments, the Massachusetts Technology Collaborative and an Israeli non-profit organization signed a cybersecurity agreement, and Baker met with Israeli Prime Minister Benjamin Netanyahu.

In September 2017, Baker, joined by Massachusetts U.S. Senators Elizabeth Warren and Ed Markey, Massachusetts U.S. Representative Stephen F. Lynch, as well as officials from the U.S. Army Corps of Engineers, the International Longshoremen's Association, the Massachusetts Port Authority, and other local elected officials, announced the beginning of a $350 million dredging project to expand Boston Harbor to accommodate larger ships.

Also in February 2018, Baker welcomed an announcement by the Massachusetts Mutual Life Insurance Company that it was going to add 1,500 jobs to its Springfield headquarters and build a second $300 million location with 500 jobs in the South Boston Seaport District. In March 2018, the Associated Industries of Massachusetts released its business confidence index showing that employer confidence in the state had hit a 17-year high, and Baker filed a $610 million economic development bill. In April 2018, Baker submitted a request to the U.S. Treasury Department that 138 census tracts in Massachusetts be designated as "opportunity zones" under the Tax Cuts and Jobs Act of 2017. The following month, the U.S. Treasury Department approved all 138 opportunity zone designations Baker requested the previous month.

In June 2018, addressing concerns about the effects of retaliatory tariffs imposed by the Canadian government in response to protectionist tariffs implemented by the Trump Administration, Baker stated "I've talked to plenty of employers and companies here in the commonwealth that are worried about the lack of clarity associated with that relationship at this point in time" and noted that Canada is New England's biggest trading partner.

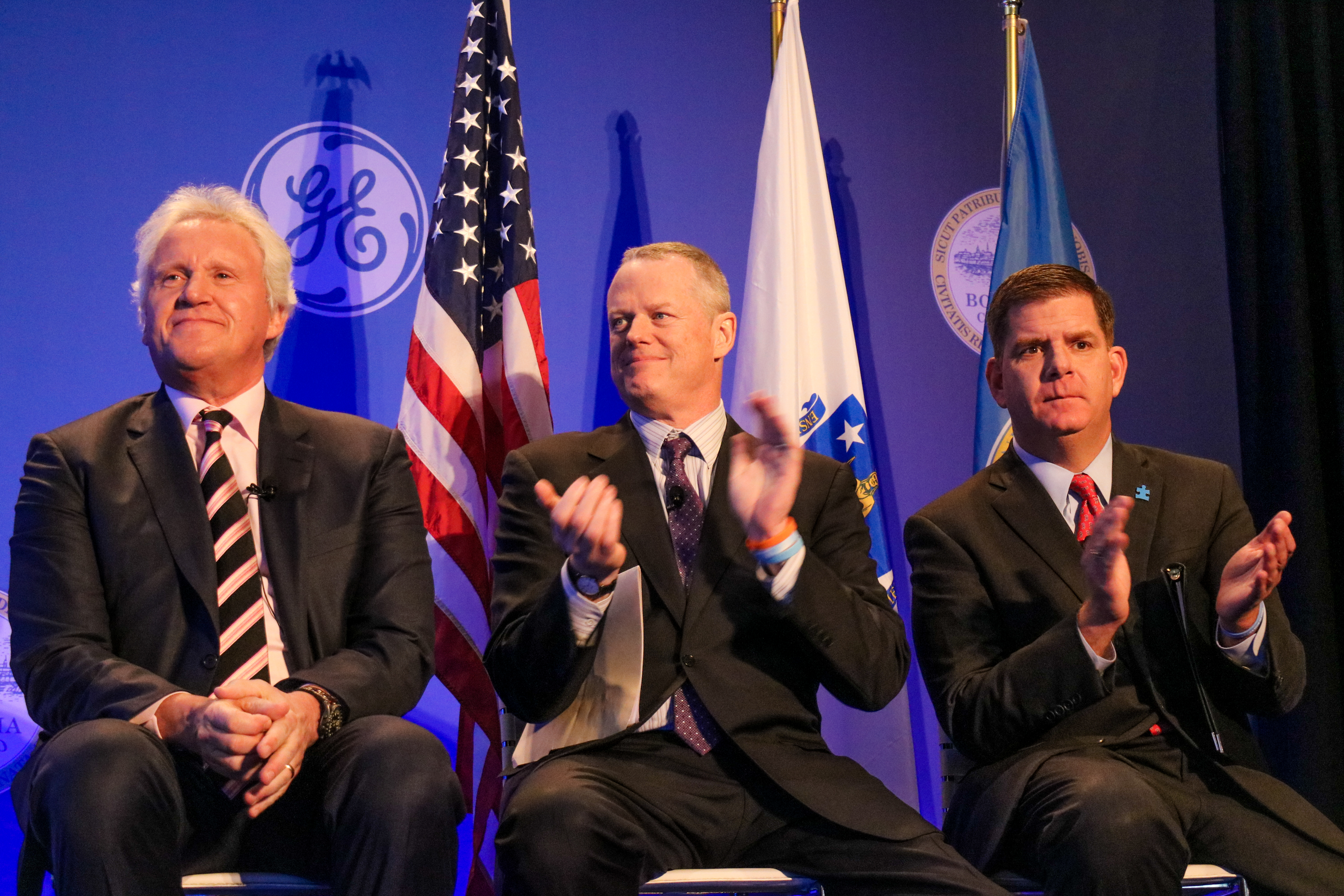
Baker (center) with General Electric CEO Jeff Immelt (left) and Boston Mayor Marty Walsh (right) at the April 2016 formal announcement that General Electric had agreed to move its headquarters to Boston

In January 2016, General Electric announced that it was moving its corporate headquarters to the South Boston Seaport District following $120 million in grants and other programs offered by Baker's administration and $25 million in property tax relief offered by Boston Mayor Marty Walsh.

In January 2017, Baker's administration announced that Massachusetts would enter a second $250 million public-private partnership with the Manufacturing USA network to form a robotics manufacturing institute in the state. In February 2017, Baker's administration announced $35 million in capital grants for life science facilities at 14 colleges, graduate schools, and research institutes in the state, and the following month, Baker's administration announced the formation of a new broadband internet access grant making program that would award $20 million in grants to over 40 towns in Western and Central Massachusetts. In April 2017, Baker's administration announced a $5 million grant to the Worcester Polytechnic Institute to help launch a digital healthcare development center.

== Housing ==
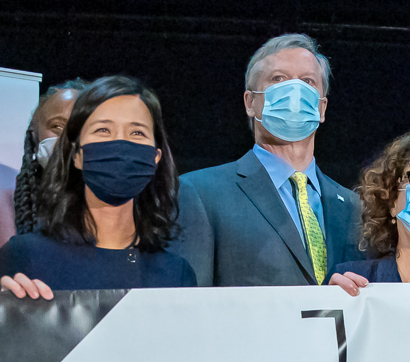
Boston Mayor Michelle Wu (left) joins Baker at the December 2021 groundbreaking of an affordable housing development

In October 2015, Baker announced a strategy to leverage unused or underutilized state land for economic development and market-rate or affordable housing. In May 2016, Baker announced that his administration would devote $1.1 billion to the development and preservation of affordable and workforce housing over the subsequent five years in the state's capital budget, and Baker also started a $100 million fund for creating workforce housing through MassHousing. In August 2016, Baker announced $90 million in subsidies and tax credits to 26 affordable housing development projects in the state. In December 2016, Baker's administration announced that the state government had sold or leased 22 pieces of state-owned property over the preceding 14 months that would create 1,500 units of new housing, 100,000 square feet of new commercial space, and that would generate $413 million in revenue for the state.

In March 2017, Baker's administration awarded $20 million to seven affordable housing developments to create 177 units of supportive housing, and the following month, Baker's administration filed a $1.3 billion housing bond bill to continue the state's support of affordable housing projects as well as provide funds for the maintenance and improvement of public housing in the state. In August 2017, Baker's administration awarded $72 million in housing subsidies and announced $28 million in state and federal tax credits to 25 affordable housing projects across the state to create, preserve, or rehabilitate nearly 2,000 units of housing. In December 2017, Baker's administration announced a $10 million initiative and zoning reform legislation to create 135,000 new housing units in the state by 2025, and the following month, Baker testified before the state legislature in support of the zoning reform.

In March 2018, Baker received an award from the Greater Boston affiliate of Habitat for Humanity for his administration's policies to create more affordable housing in the state. In May 2018, Baker's administration announced the designation of 67 municipalities in the state as "housing choice communities" in partnership with MassHousing, and Baker signed into law a $1.8 billion affordable housing bill. In July 2018, Baker announced $57 million in subsidies and tax credits to 19 affordable rental housing projects in the state. In November 2018, Baker stated that he would support raising the state's Registry of Deeds fee associated with funding the state's Community Preservation Trust Fund so that each town participating in the state's affordable housing program under the Community Preservation Act will each receive at least a 50 percent matching funds rate from the state. In December 2018, Baker's administration announced that Housing and Economic Development Secretary Jay Ash would be stepping down from the position and that he would be succeeded by his assistant secretary Mike Kennealy.

== Transportation ==
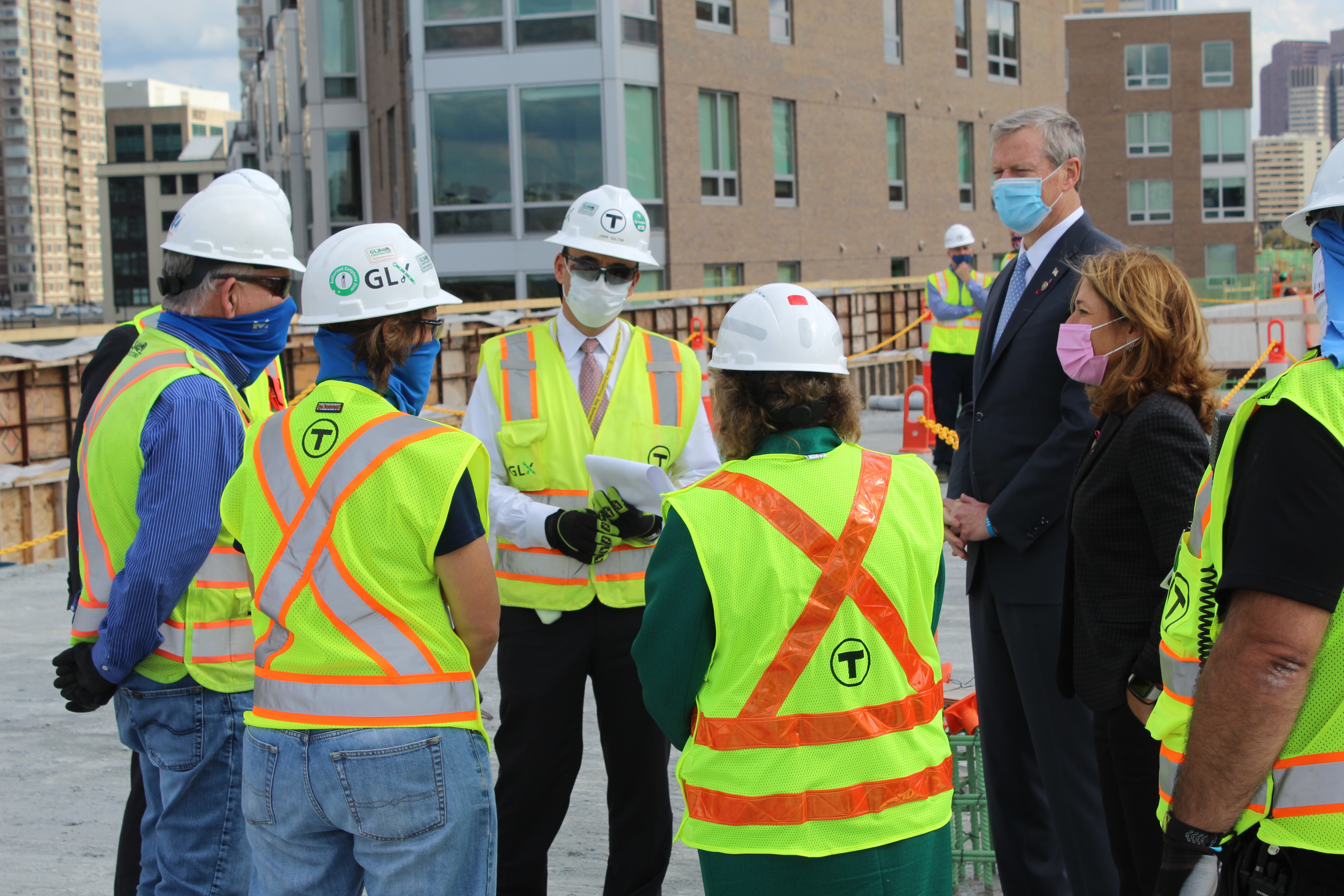
Baker joins workers at the construction site of the Lechmere station in October 2020

Before his tenure as governor, Baker supported the 2014 ballot measure that repealed indexing the state gas tax to inflation. On his first day in office, Baker directed the Massachusetts Department of Transportation to release $100 million in aid to local governments to fund upgrades to transportation infrastructure. In February 2015, Baker directed the Massachusetts Department of Public Utilities to issue a public notice clarifying the status of transportation network companies (such as Uber and Lyft) while his administration developed a regulatory framework for the industry. In the wake of the 2014–15 winter, Baker started a $30 million pothole repair fund in March 2015 and filed the state's annual $200 million bill to the state legislature for infrastructure funding aid to local governments through the state's Chapter 90 program (which was approved the following month). In June 2015, Baker submitted a $2.13 billion capital budget for fiscal year 2016.

In October 2015, Baker and the state's Division of Insurance approved a proposed insurance policy by USAA to provide additional coverage to current policyholders who are employed as transportation network company drivers. In February 2016, Baker requested the annual $200 million bill from the state legislature for infrastructure funding aid to local governments through the state's Chapter 90 program, which was approved the following April. In May 2016, Baker submitted a $2.19 billion capital budget for fiscal year 2017, and the following month, Baker's administration launched a multi-faceted initiative to reduce motor vehicle accidents during the upcoming summer. After proposing similar legislation the previous year, in August 2016, Baker signed into law a bill regulating transportation network companies by implementing a 20-cent per ride company surcharge, mandating vehicle insurance requirements, and background checks for company drivers.

Also in August 2016, Baker vetoed a pilot program for a vehicle miles traveled tax, and Baker signed into law a bill that expanded a program to improve local street network safety and efficiency that was launched earlier that year, authorized $50 million in spending over the subsequent five years for repairs to small municipal bridges, and included a $750 million authorization request for the federal aid highway program. In October 2016, Baker issued an executive order to create a regulatory framework for the testing of driverless cars in Massachusetts, and in the same month, oversaw the opening of the state's electronic tolling system along the Massachusetts Turnpike. In April 2017, the Massachusetts Department of Public Utilities released data showing that more than 8,000 of the 70,000 drivers for transportation network companies who applied failed to pass the state background check requirement signed into law by Baker the previous August.

In May 2017, Baker signed into law the annual Chapter 90 funding request, which came to $290 million so as to include funding for a software platform for the state Registry of Motor Vehicles and to reauthorize a mobility assistance program, and Baker submitted a $2.26 billion capital budget for fiscal year 2018. In July 2017, Baker's administration visited construction projects across the state to highlight $2.8 billion spent during his administration on highway construction projects and improvements to bridges, intersections, and sidewalks. In September 2017, Baker's administration announced that it was planning to create a new commission to review the state's transportation needs, and Baker enacted the commission by executive order the following January. In October 2017, Baker's administration awarded $8.5 million to 10 rural towns through the MassWorks infrastructure program.

In November 2017, Baker called for the state legislature to pass legislation banning handheld cellphone use while driving (as well as other handheld electronic devices), with exceptions for hands-free technology usage and emergency situations. In February 2018, Baker filed the annual $200 million request for Chapter 90 funding for 2018. In May 2018, Baker's administration announced a $2.34 billion capital budget for fiscal year 2019. At Springfield Union Station in June 2018, Baker, along with Massachusetts U.S. Representative Richard Neal and Springfield Mayor Domenic Sarno, issued an RFP for a consulting group to study the feasibility of an east–west passenger rail line in the state from Boston to Springfield (or potentially Pittsfield), announced a pilot passenger rail service in between Greenfield and Springfield, and also announced the launch of the Hartford Line commuter rail service from Springfield through Hartford, Connecticut, to New Haven.

In July 2018, Baker signed into law a $3.9 billion bond bill for the maintenance and modernization of the state's capital assets. In the same month, Baker line-item vetoed a pilot program for road congestion pricing, while the state legislature rejected an amendment to the state budget Baker proposed for a congestion study as an alternative to the pilot program. In December 2018, the commission Baker enacted the previous January to review the state's transportation needs released a two-volume report outlining 18 specific recommendations in five broad categories, and the Massachusetts Department of Transportation released a report showing that wait times at the state's Registry of Motor Vehicles offices had increased over the previous year, which state officials attributed to the introduction of the federal Real ID Act in the state. In November 2019, Baker signed into law a bill banning the use of handheld electronic devices while driving. The bill went into effect on February 23, 2020.

In November 2022, an opinion poll by the University of Massachusetts Amherst and WCVB found that 57% Massachusetts voters believed that Baker had done a poor job of handling transit issues as governor, while only 34% believed he had done a good job. However, only 11% of Massachusetts voters believed that Baker bore the fault for problems that the MBTA was facing, with 25% of voters unsure of who to blame, 13% blaming the State Legislature, and 3% blaming Boston Mayor Michelle Wu.

== Education ==
=== PK-12 ===
In June 2015, Baker announced $5 million in grants to the state's 85 regional public school districts for transportation. In October 2015, Baker filed legislation to increase the state cap on the number of new charter schools in the state by 12 per year, and later in the same month, testified in favor of the legislation before the state legislature. In January 2016, Baker announced $83.5 million in funding for vocational education in the state, as well as a $72.1 million increase in the state's Chapter 70 local education funding and a $42 million increase in unrestricted local aid for education for fiscal year 2017, and the following month, Baker proposed increasing the state's charter school reimbursement formula to school districts by $20.5 million.

In March 2016, Baker opposed a proposed overhaul to the state's charter school system being debated in the Massachusetts Senate at the time, and the following month, the Massachusetts Senate rejected Baker's proposed charter school cap increase. In July 2016, Baker vetoed a pay increase for pre-kindergarten teachers. The following month, Massachusetts students ranked first in the nation on their average ACT scores. In November 2016, Baker campaigned on behalf of a ballot initiative to raise the state cap on new charter schools which failed to pass, and in the same month, Baker's administration expanded a STEM internship program allowing high school students to work at related companies in the state.

In January 2017, Baker signed into law a bill requiring all Massachusetts schools to have automated external defibrillators on site, announced that the state had received a $2 million grant from the Council of Chief State School Officers and JPMorgan Chase to improve career education in the state, and proposed a $91 million increase (to a total of $4.7 billion) in Chapter 70 local education funding and a $40 million increase (to a total of $1.062 billion) in unrestricted local aid for education for fiscal year 2018. In February 2017, Baker's administration announced $4 million in capital grants to 49 Massachusetts public high schools to purchase science equipment, and in the same month, the Massachusetts Department of Elementary and Secondary Education released data showing that the four-year graduation rate in the state had increased to 87.5 percent, and that the dropout rates in Holyoke, Lawrence, and Springfield had all declined by more than 50 percent over the previous five years.

In March 2017, Baker proposed a six percent pay increase for pre-kindergarten teachers. In May 2017, Baker and Boston Mayor Marty Walsh announced a dual enrollment program between the John D. O'Bryant School of Mathematics & Science and the Massachusetts Maritime Academy, and in the same month, Baker and Walsh also announced a pilot program making college tuition and mandatory fees free to qualifying low-income Boston public high school graduates attending Bunker Hill Community College, Roxbury Community College, or Massachusetts Bay Community College. In October 2017, Baker attended the launch of an early college program at Lawrence High School allowing students to take courses at Merrimack College or Northern Essex Community College.

In November 2017, Baker signed into law a bill expanding options for schools in fulfilling English as a second language requirements for their immigrant students. In February 2018, Baker's administration announced $2.3 million in capital grants to seven Massachusetts public high schools to purchase vocational training equipment, and as part of a supplemental spending bill, Baker signed into law a $15 million appropriation to Massachusetts public schools that accepted students from Puerto Rico after Hurricane Maria. In March 2018, Baker signed into law a bill preventing a steep health insurance price increase for retired public school teachers. In June 2021, all Plymouth Public Schools, South West Middle School in Quincy, Rockland Senior High School, and Weymouth High School were placed into a state program for schools or districts that disproportionately suspend nonwhite students or students with disabilities.

=== Higher education ===
In August 2015, Baker announced $5.5 million in capital funding for Holyoke Community College and Springfield Technical Community College for ongoing construction projects on their campuses. In April 2016, Baker announced a college affordability and completion plan for the state's public universities and colleges. In September 2016, Baker's administration announced their intention to work with the state's Department of Higher Education and the University of Massachusetts system to develop a pilot program to support the MicroMasters programs developed by the massive open online course provider edX. In February 2017, Baker's administration announced $35 million in capital grants for life science facilities at 14 colleges, graduate schools, and research institutes in the state.

In November 2017, Baker announced the formation of a new commission on digital learning.

==== UMass Amherst ====
In April 2018, University of Massachusetts Amherst and Mount Ida College administrators announced that the former school would acquire the latter's campus in Newton after the latter college's closure. The acquisition received public opposition from University of Massachusetts Boston faculty and students, due to the proximity of Mount Ida's campus to the Boston campus and UMass Boston's budget deficit caused by extensive campus repairs and expansion (ultimately necessitated by the negligent construction of the UMass Boston campus in the 1970s) that have led to cutbacks in academic spending and offerings of courses required for graduation. In response, Massachusetts Attorney General Maura Healey announced that she would investigate the details of the acquisition, Baker expressed disappointment in the Mount Ida administration's financial management, and in response to the criticism of the acquisition from the UMass Boston campus, Baker stated that the selection of a new permanent chancellor "is going to be a big statement about the leadership and the direction of the campus going forward." The next month, Healey's office approved the sale of the Mount Ida campus to UMass Amherst.

==== UMass Boston ====
In April 2017, Baker's administration announced $78 million in capital funding towards repairs of the University of Massachusetts Boston underground parking garage.

In May 2018, the UMass Boston Faculty Council passed a motion of no confidence in University of Massachusetts President Marty Meehan, and 10 days after three finalists for the UMass Boston chancellor position were named, on May 21, 2018, all three finalists withdrew from consideration after faculty members questioned the candidates' qualifications. The day after the withdrawals, Baker said he was "disappointed about the whole way this thing [the UMass Boston chancellor search] has played out". Also in May 2018, the U.S. Treasury Department approved a request Baker submitted that the Columbia Point census tract, which includes the former Bayside Expo Center (a property owned by UMass Boston that the UMass System put up for sale the previous January), be designated as an opportunity zone under the Tax Cuts and Jobs Act of 2017. The next month, State Senator Kathleen O'Connor Ives said that a Massachusetts Senate report to be released later that month found that the board of trustees of Mount Ida College had violated its fiduciary duties in closing the school. In July 2018, Baker included an amendment to a $583 million supplemental appropriations bill requiring public and private colleges and universities to report any financial liabilities or risks to the long-term financial viability of the institution to the Massachusetts Department of Higher Education, which Baker signed into law as a full bill in November 2019. In February 2019, the UMass Board of Trustees unanimously approved a 99-year final lease agreement for the Bayside Expo Center with Accordia Partners for up to $235 million.

In May 2019, the Pioneer Institute released a white paper co-authored by former Massachusetts State Representative Gregory W. Sullivan (who also served as the Massachusetts Inspector General) that reviewed records obtained from the UMass System Controller's Office (as well as other publicly available documents) that concluded that UMass Boston Chancellor J. Keith Motley and other UMass Boston administrators were scapegoated for the 2017 fiscal year $30 million budget deficit (for which Motley resigned as Chancellor in July 2017) when Meehan commissioned an audit of UMass Boston administration and finances by KPMG for presentation to the UMass System Board of Trustees in November 2017. Instead, the white paper concludes that the UMass System Board of Trustees' approval of an accelerated five-year capital spending plan in December 2014 without assuring that capital reserves would be made available to pay for the plan, as well as an error to a five-year campus reserve ratio estimate prepared by the UMass Central Budget Office and presented to the System Board of Trustees in April 2016, caused the $26 million in budget reductions interim Chancellor Barry Mills implemented, and that the reductions were made at the UMass Central Office's direction.

The white paper also states that KPMG's 2017 audit was not conducted in accordance with Generally Accepted Government Auditing Standards or reported in accordance with auditing standards prescribed by the American Institute of Certified Public Accountants, and that the purchase of Mount Ida College in April 2018 was conducted by a wire transfer from the UMass System for $75 million without being included on the previously approved university capital plan at the time the UMass Central Office ordered the budget reductions, rather than being purchased with loanable funds to be repaid with interest (and in contrast to how the transaction was described in a press statement issued by Meehan's office). The next month, interim Chancellor Katherine Newman issued a press statement disputing the white paper's findings.

== Energy policy ==
=== Energy efficiency ===
In May 2015, Baker's administration announced a $10 million energy storage initiative. In February 2016, Baker launched a $15 million initiative creating an inter-secretariat working group between state agencies to write a report identifying better means of allocating funding to low- and middle-income residents to access clean energy. In September 2016, the American Council for an Energy-Efficient Economy ranked Massachusetts first in energy efficiency for the sixth straight year. In April 2017, the inter-secretariat working group formed by Baker in February 2016 issued its final report and Baker announced the release of $10 million in grants to increase access for low-income Massachusetts residents to energy efficiency projects, such as solar panels, as the final component of the same initiative. Also in April 2017, the Union of Concerned Scientists ranked Massachusetts first in energy efficiency standards and third in overall clean energy progress.

In June 2017, Baker's administration announced a 200 megawatt-hour energy storage target in accordance with energy diversification legislation Baker signed into law in August 2016. In December 2017, Baker's administration announced that it was awarding $20 million in grants to 26 projects to develop the state's energy storage market, in accordance with the same energy diversification law and the administration's energy storage initiative begun in May 2015. In April 2018, Baker filed legislation to increase access to information for current and prospective Massachusetts homeowners about the energy efficiency characteristics and recommended cost-effective energy efficiency improvements to their residences. In November 2018, Baker, along with a bipartisan group of 18 other governors, wrote an open letter to Federal Energy Regulatory Commission Chairman Neil Chatterjee urging the commission to begin discussions with state governments, regional transmission organizations, U.S. Congress, and businesses about unifying the three main power grids in the United States. The following month, the Massachusetts Department of Energy Resources released a comprehensive energy plan in accordance with an executive order Baker issued in September 2016 for state agencies to develop a statewide adaptation plan for climate change.

=== Hydropower and wind power ===
In July 2015, Baker's administration filed legislation to stabilize electricity rates in Massachusetts by increasing access to hydroelectricity with Baker himself stating: "This legislation is critical to reducing our carbon footprint, meeting the goals of the Global Warming Solutions Act and protecting ratepayers already struck by sky high energy prices." In March 2016, the legislation received the endorsement of all three of the Energy and Environmental Affairs Secretaries of the Deval Patrick administration, and the following August, Baker signed the legislation into law, requiring the state to procure 1,200 megawatts of hydropower, as well as 1,600 megawatts of offshore wind power. In June 2017, Massachusetts utilities issued the first RFP under the energy diversification law signed by Baker in August 2016, and the following month, five major bids were submitted.

In January 2018, Baker's administration announced that Eversource Energy's Northern Pass Project had received preliminary approval for the hydropower procurement under the energy diversification law. The following month, the New Hampshire Site Evaluation Committee rejected the Northern Pass Project's permit application to build a transmission line through New Hampshire, raising uncertainty to the status of Eversource's proposal. In March 2018, the Massachusetts Department of Energy Resources announced that the state's electric distribution companies had "terminated the conditional selection of the Northern Pass Hydro project," and were concluding negotiations on the RFP runner-up proposal, Central Maine Power's 1.2 GW New England Clean Energy Connect project, as a replacement. The Maine Department of Environmental Protection approved the project in May 2020.

=== Nuclear energy ===
In September 2015, after the Nuclear Regulatory Commission (NRC) downgraded the safety rating of the Pilgrim Nuclear Power Station, Baker sent an open letter to the nuclear operations of the Entergy Corporation that owns and operates the plant, urging them to "perform an appropriate root cause analysis of [plant] shutdowns and to complete all necessary repairs and corrective actions." The following month, after Entergy announced that they would close the plant by June 1, 2019 rather than make expensive safety upgrades required by the NRC, Baker said that the closure was "a disappointment but it's not a surprise," with his administration stating that it "will work closely with Pilgrim's leadership team and federal regulators to ensure that this decision is managed as safely as possible, and we will continue to work with ISO and the other New England Governors to ensure that Massachusetts and New England has the baseload capacity it needs to meet the electric generation needs of the region." In August 2018, Entergy announced that it had reached an agreement to sell the Pilgrim facility to Holtec International to conduct its decommissioning, and the following month, officials from both companies met with NRC officials in Washington, D.C., to review the agreement.

=== Offshore drilling ===
In February 2018, Baker, along with the entire Massachusetts congressional delegation, wrote an open letter to U.S. Secretary of the Interior Ryan Zinke urging the Trump Administration to not include Massachusetts or North Atlantic waters in the administration's 2019–2024 National Outer Continental Shelf Oil and Gas Leasing program.

== Environmental policy ==
=== Climate change ===
In January 2016, Baker's administration announced that Massachusetts was on track to meet its greenhouse gas reduction goals. In September 2016, following the record breaking snowfall in Boston from the 2014–15 North American winter and during a severe drought, Baker signed an executive order directing various state cabinet offices to develop and implement a statewide, comprehensive climate change adaptation plan. In December 2016, Baker's administration released regulations to reduce greenhouse gas emissions from the natural gas, transportation, and electricity generation industries. In January 2017, in order to meet emission reductions goals, Baker signed into law a bill to promote the sale and use of electric vehicles. In February 2017, Baker joined a bipartisan coalition of governors that sent an open letter to President Donald Trump, calling on his administration to support renewable energy.

In May 2017, prior to the United States withdrawal from the 2015 Paris Agreement on climate change mitigation, Baker and Vermont Governor Phil Scott wrote an open letter to U.S. Secretary of Energy Rick Perry urging the Trump Administration to remain committed to the agreement. After President Trump unilaterally withdrew the United States from the agreement, Baker criticized the decision and was among ten American governors that agreed to continue upholding the standards of the agreement within their states. In November 2017, the Massachusetts Senate passed a Comprehensive Adaptation Management Plan for a fifth time, but as of March 7, 2018, was under review by the Massachusetts House Ways and Means Committee.

After a pair of nor'easters from March 1 through March 3 and March 6 through March 8, Baker said he planned to file legislation the following week on climate change, and on March 15, 2018, he submitted a $1.4 billion climate resiliency bond bill that called on all Massachusetts town governments to formulate vulnerability and hazard mitigation plans to address climate change problems unique to their communities. In June 2018, Baker's administration announced $5 million in grants to 34 cities and towns for climate change vulnerability preparedness. In August 2018, Baker signed into law bipartisan legislation authorizing $2.4 billion in capital spending on climate change safeguards for municipalities and businesses, reforestation and forest protection, and environmental resource protection, and the Massachusetts Department of Environmental Protection released data showing that while greenhouse gas emissions in Massachusetts rose by 3% in 2015, the level of greenhouse gas emissions in 2015 was 19% lower than in 1990.

In December 2018, Baker's administration announced that it would extend the state's electric vehicle rebate program through the end of the following June, and a transportation commission Baker enacted by executive order the previous January released a report stating that all vehicles sold in the state should be electric by 2040. The same month, the Massachusetts Department of Energy Resources released a comprehensive energy plan in accordance with an executive order Baker issued in September 2016 for state agencies to develop a statewide adaptation plan for climate change, and Massachusetts, along with eight other states and the District of Columbia, announced that it would participate in the interstate Transportation and Climate Initiative to reduce greenhouse gas emissions from the transportation sector; he withdrew from the TCI, in part, because it was "no longer necessary." In January 2019, the Massachusetts Department of Environmental Protection released data showing that greenhouse gas emissions in Massachusetts declined by 2.5% in 2016 and the level of greenhouse gas emissions in 2016 was 21% lower than in 1990.

=== Endangered species and parks ===
In May 2016, Baker spoke in defense of a Deval Patrick administration proposal to create a timber rattlesnake colony on an isolated island in the Quabbin Reservoir that is closed to the public. In July 2017, Baker launched the third year of the Summer Nights for Youth Initiative to extend operating hours and expand programming at city parks across the state. In September 2017, Baker's administration announced it would increase the budget of the state Recreational Trails Program by 60%, from $1.1 million to $1.8 million, to construct 10 new miles of walking and biking trails and improve the existing 150 miles planned or completed during the previous two years of his administration. In August 2018, Baker's administration announced $3.9 million in grants to 75 trail projects across the state.

=== Water quality and recycling ===
On April 21, 2016, Baker's administration sided with the U.S. Environmental Protection Agency in a dispute with General Electric over cleanup of the Housatonic River. The next week, after four Boston public schools (including Boston Latin Academy) were found to have levels of lead above the state action level in fountain drinking water, the administration announced that it would provide $2 million from the Massachusetts Clean Water Trust to fund a testing program operated by the Massachusetts Department of Environmental Protection to provide technical assistance to public school districts in assessing samples of water both from fountains and from taps used in food preparation. The next November, Baker provided an additional $750,000 to the program for further technical assistance with sampling and testing.

Also in April 2016, Baker filed legislation requesting that the state Department of Environmental Protection be delegated to oversee Clean Water Act pollution discharge permits from the U.S. Environmental Protection Agency along with 46 other states, and then again in March 2017 after the previous bill received opposition from Democrats on the state legislature's Joint Committee on Environment, Natural Resources and Agriculture. In April 2017, Baker's administration awarded $900,000 in grants to five different public water suppliers. In February 2018, the administration announced that 58 clean water initiatives and 28 drinking water projects across Massachusetts would be eligible for $610 million in loans to fund construction projects to upgrade or replace drinking water and wastewater infrastructure, reduce treatment plant energy usage and costs, and improve water quality. In June 2018, Baker's administration announced $50,000 in grants to Gosnold and Dartmouth for habitat conservation and water quality protection projects in Buzzards Bay. In August 2018, the administration announced $2.6 million in grants for municipal recycling programs.

== Health care policy ==
=== Federal ===
In May 2015, Baker sent a request to U.S. Secretary of Health and Human Services Sylvia Mathews Burwell to delay changes under the Patient Protection and Affordable Care Act (ACA) to the small business health insurance market in Massachusetts until the state government could formally file for a waiver, which was secured the next month and authorized in August. In May 2016, Baker's administration announced that the Centers for Medicare & Medicaid Services gave Massachusetts permission to continue allowing small businesses to purchase health insurance year-round, and the following July, secured a one-year waiver from the U.S. Department of Health and Human Services to allow Massachusetts health insurers to continue using small group rating factors unaligned with the ACA.

In October 2016, Baker criticized the length of the Food and Drug Administration's approval process for generic drugs, stated that progress was being made with the Obama Administration on a waiver extension for the state Medicaid program MassHealth, and expressed support for public discussion about changes to the ACA early the following year, stating: "It's my hope that states will be permitted to engage the federal government in an honest conversation about what's working and what needs to be worked on with respect to the ACA." In November 2016, Baker's administration received approval from the Centers for Medicare and Medicaid Services to implement a five-year waiver authorizing a $52.4 billion restructuring of MassHealth. In December 2016, Baker announced his support for the 21st Century Cures Act passed by the 114th U.S. Congress.

In January 2017, in an open letter to U.S. House Majority Leader Kevin McCarthy, Baker defended certain provisions of the ACA and urged the 115th U.S. Congress not to repeal the law too quickly and disrupt insurance markets. In March 2017, Baker said that discussions with Republican Congressional leadership and incoming U.S. Secretary of Health and Human Services Tom Price at a National Governors Association meeting were "mostly a one-way street type conversation," and expressed opposition to cuts in funding for the National Institutes of Health in the Trump Administration's 2018 U.S. federal budget.

Later in March 2017, and after writing in an open letter to all members of the Massachusetts congressional delegation that the state could lose $1 billion in federal health care funding under the American Health Care Act of 2017 (AHCA), Baker opposed the version of the AHCA being voted on by the U.S. House of Representatives at the time. After the House passed it the following May, Baker released a statement saying that he was "disappointed by today's vote" but that as "the U.S. Senate takes up this bill, we will continue to advocate for the Commonwealth's priorities so that all residents have access to the health coverage they need", and urged Congress to reject the bill.

In June 2017, Baker, Ohio Governor John Kasich, Colorado Governor John Hickenlooper, Montana Governor Steve Bullock, Nevada Governor Brian Sandoval, Pennsylvania Governor Tom Wolf, and Louisiana Governor John Bel Edwards sent an open letter to U.S. Senate Majority Leader Mitch McConnell and Minority Leader Chuck Schumer stating their opposition to the AHCA bill passed the previous month due to its spending cuts to Medicaid and called on Senate leaders to craft a more bipartisan reform. Later the same month, Baker wrote in an open letter to Massachusetts U.S. Senator Elizabeth Warren that more than 250,000 Massachusetts residents could lose health care coverage under the Senate AHCA amendment, the Better Care Reconciliation Act of 2017 (BCRA), and the next month, in a second open letter to Senate leadership that now also included Virginia Governor Terry McAuliffe, Maryland Governor Larry Hogan, and Vermont Governor Phil Scott, Baker and nine other governors also opposed the Health Care Freedom Act of 2017 (HCFA).

In August 2017, Baker was called to testify before the U.S. Senate Committee on Health, Education, Labor and Pensions on the ACA, which he did the next month, as well as writing a third open letter to Senate leadership with largely the same group of governors (with Alaska Governor Bill Walker joining) opposing the Graham–Cassidy health care amendment. In October 2017, Baker opposed the Trump administration's decision to end ACA cost-sharing reduction payments, and along with the previous group of governors, wrote a fourth open letter to Senate leadership supporting the Bipartisan Health Care Stabilization Act of 2017 sponsored by Senators Lamar Alexander and Patty Murray. In November 2017, Baker wrote to Speaker of the U.S. House of Representatives Paul Ryan and U.S. House Minority Leader Nancy Pelosi urging them to reauthorize the Children's Health Insurance Program (CHIP).

=== State ===
In February 2016, Baker signed into law a bill endorsed by the American Cancer Society and the Dana–Farber Cancer Institute that increased the minimum age for using tanning facilities to 18 in order to counter increases in skin cancer among minors. In March 2016, Baker's administration cut $60 million from the state program Health Safety Net and Baker said that he wanted hospital pricing resolved by the state legislature rather than by a ballot initiative. The next May, he signed into law a compromise bill on hospital pricing. In August 2016, the state legislature overrode Baker's veto of legislation requiring health insurance coverage for long-term Lyme disease treatment. Later the same month, Baker signed into law a bill mandating insurance coverage of treatment for HIV-associated lipodystrophy caused by older HIV medications.

In December 2016, due to Baker's midyear budget cuts, Baystate Health lost $1 million in funding. In January 2017, in his state budget proposal for fiscal year 2018, Baker proposed a $2,000-per-employee assessment on businesses that do not offer health insurance to counter spending growth in MassHealth, which was opposed by the state business community and supported by health care unions. In February 2017, Baker's administration announced that the Massachusetts Health Connector enrolled the highest number of health insurance applicants since the implementation of the Patient Protection and Affordable Care Act (ACA). Also in February 2017, Baker's administration announced that it signed a contract with Correct Care Solutions to provide clinical patient care at Bridgewater State Hospital, and the next April, the administration announced that Correct Care Solutions had transitioned Bridgewater State Hospital to improved patient care.

After signaling a willingness to compromise on his proposed employer health insurance assessment the previous March, Baker signed into law $200 million in new fees and fines on Massachusetts employers to counter spending increases in MassHealth in August 2017. In September 2017, the state government's Center for Health Information and Analysis released data showing that the state curbed the growth of its health care spending for the first time in three years. In March 2018, Baker signed into law greater patient privacy protections from health insurance companies, and the next month, a commission Baker enacted the previous year to investigate evidence-based approaches to behavioral health released its final report.

=== COVID-19 pandemic ===
Baker's handling of the COVID-19 pandemic has received mixed reviews. Massachusetts has one of the country's highest infection and death rates. More than half the deaths happened in state-supervised nursing homes, in particular those serving persons of color. Baker's lack of transparency about infections and death rates has been criticized by the media and public health researchers have urged him to follow the lead of the CDC and many other states and provide accurate and complete data.

== Social policy ==
=== Abortion and contraception ===
Baker is pro-choice. In August 2016, he signed a bipartisan pay equity bill into law to diminish gender-based pay gaps in the state, which went into effect on July 1, 2018. In January 2017, Baker voiced support for the Women's Marches being held across the United States. In March 2017, after congressional Republicans in the 115th U.S. Congress proposed a defunding provision to the American Health Care Act of 2017 that would make Planned Parenthood clinics in Massachusetts ineligible for nearly $2 million in Medicaid medical service reimbursements and federal family planning grants under Title X, Baker's administration promised to offset the funding gap.

In July 2017, Baker signed into law a bill requiring employers to provide "reasonable accommodations" for female employees who are pregnant and banning employment discrimination in hiring or termination against female employees who are pregnant, which went into effect in April 2018. In October 2017, when the Trump administration issued new regulations allowing insurers and employers to opt out of contraceptive mandates, Baker reiterated his support for such mandates, and the next month signed into law a bill requiring Massachusetts insurers to cover birth control without copayments. In February 2018, Baker's administration announced a supplemental spending bill that included $1.6 million for clinical family planning services that would backfill federal funding for Planned Parenthood clinics. Baker said, "Our administration fully supports access to women's health care and family planning services, and is requesting supplemental state funding to support these critical services in the event of an interruption in federal funding."

In July 2018, Baker criticized a proposed revision by the Trump Administration to Title X banning health clinics from sharing workspace and financial resources with abortion providers, and signed into law a bill repealing state abortion laws that would have been retroactively reinstated when Roe v. Wade was overturned, as well as laws against adultery, fornication, and physicians prescribing contraceptives to unmarried women. The same month, after Brett Kavanaugh's nomination to the Supreme Court, Baker urged the U.S. Senate to consider Kavanaugh's position on abortion as part of its vetting process, and was one of three Republican governors who declined to sign an open letter supporting Kavanaugh's nomination signed by 31 other governors. On the day before Kavanaugh's Senate confirmation vote in October 2018, Baker said he believed that Kavanaugh should not be on the Supreme Court, reiterating his concerns about Kavanaugh's views on Roe v. Wade, as well as the multiple sexual assault allegations made against Kavanaugh during the confirmation process.

In December 2020, Baker vetoed a bill that would lower to 16 the age at which someone can get an abortion without parental consent. The bill also extended the time frame for abortions beyond 24 weeks in cases in which the fetus cannot survive or the pregnancy would impose a substantial risk of grave impairment of the person's physical or mental health. Baker said, "I cannot support the sections of this proposal that expand the availability of later term abortions and permit minors age 16 and 17 to get an abortion without the consent of a parent or guardian". Massachusetts Republican Party Chairman Jim Lyons applauded Baker in a statement, saying "Governor Baker correctly recognized that this legislation simply goes too far, and he should be applauded for standing up and saying no to the abortion lobby". The state legislature overrode the veto five days later. In May 2022, after Justice Samuel Alito's draft opinion in Dobbs v. Jackson Women's Health Organization was leaked, Baker said overturning Roe v. Wade would be a "massive setback" for women. After the final opinion was issued in June 2022, officially overturning Roe v. Wade, Baker signed an executive order protecting abortion rights in Massachusetts.

=== Capital punishment ===
After Dzhokhar Tsarnaev's conviction for the 2013 Boston Marathon bombing in April 2015, Baker released a statement supporting the verdict and said he supported the death penalty for Tsarnaev, to which Tsarnaev was sentenced the next month. After the homicides of a police officer in Yarmouth in April 2018 and a police sergeant in Weymouth in July 2018, Baker said he supports making the murder of police officers a capital crime.

=== Immigration ===
Although Baker announced in July 2015 he would veto any bill that gave illegal immigrants in-state tuition and state aid for public colleges and universities, he maintained support for an existing Massachusetts statute that grants in-state tuition and state aid to Deferred Action for Childhood Arrivals (DACA) recipients. In September 2015, President Barack Obama's administration proposed accepting 10,000 Syrian Civil War refugees into the country, and Baker relayed his initial support for the proposal. He said: "The United States is part of the global community. This is clearly a global crisis, and we should do as a nation what I would call ... our fair share." But Baker also said he wanted to understand "What the game plan was, what the expectations were, [and] how we would anticipate paying for whatever it is they would expect supporters to do." In the wake of the November 2015 Paris attacks, Baker opposed allowing additional Syrian refugees into the state until he knew more about the federal government's process for vetting them, and was criticized for his opposition by Massachusetts Senator Ed Markey and Representatives Jim McGovern and Seth Moulton. Baker declined to sign an open letter sent by 27 other Republican governors to President Obama that called for the immediate suspension of all efforts to resettle Syrian refugees, with his administration stating that he "believes that Massachusetts has a role in welcoming refugees into the commonwealth and in the wake of recent, terrible tragedies overseas is working to ensure the public's safety and security."

In July 2016, Baker signed a bill into law that prevents illegal immigrants from obtaining driver's licenses. After Donald Trump became president in January 2017, Baker opposed the Trump administration's original and revised travel bans, arguing that "focusing on countries' predominant religions will not make the country safer", and wrote an open letter to then U.S. Secretary of Homeland Security John F. Kelly highlighting concerns with the effects of the travel ban on Massachusetts businesses, colleges and universities, and academic medical centers.

In February 2017, Baker said that the restaurants and other businesses closed for the Day Without Immigrants protest were making a "big statement" with their strike. That same month, Baker voiced opposition to a Trump administration proposal to deploy 100,000 U.S. National Guard soldiers to increase enforcement of the administration's immigration policies. The next month, he said his administration was cooperating with an FBI investigation of bomb threats made against Jewish Community Centers in the state, calling the threats "horribly destructive and disturbing." In May 2017, Baker said he opposed legislation proposed in the state legislature that would make Massachusetts a sanctuary state because he believes sanctuary status decisions are "best made at a local level," but in July he said he was "open-minded" about statewide sanctuary status.

In August 2017, after the Massachusetts Supreme Judicial Court ruled that local police departments cannot detain any person solely based on requests from federal immigration authorities the previous month, Baker's administration filed legislation that would allow the Massachusetts State Police and local departments to detain individuals previously convicted of a felony or "aliens [illegal immigrants] who pose a threat to public safety," but not to authorize local police to "enforce federal immigration law."

In September 2017, Baker opposed Trump's administrative decision to phase out the DACA program and said that U.S. Immigration and Customs Enforcement (ICE) raids targeting sanctuary cities should focus on arresting convicted criminals in the country illegally and not on illegal immigrants whose only crime is illegal entry. The same month, he criticized Trump for his comments about the NFL racial inequality protests as "unpresidential and divisive." In November 2017, Baker wrote an open letter to acting U.S. Secretary of Homeland Security Elaine Duke urging the Trump administration to continue to allow citizens of El Salvador, Haiti, and Honduras to stay in the U.S. under temporary protected status, and the next month, Baker and a bipartisan group of 11 other governors wrote an open letter to the leadership of the 115th U.S. Congress urging it to allow DACA recipients to stay in the U.S. as well.

In January 2018, Baker criticized Trump for his comments about immigration from Latin America and Africa, saying that Trump's comments were "appalling and disgraceful and have no place anywhere in public or private discourse." Despite revisions to sanctuary status legislation proposed the previous year, Baker opposed a revised version of the legislation after it was submitted in the state legislature in February 2018, and the next May, he said he would veto the revised version of the legislation attached in the state legislature as an amendment to the 2019 fiscal year state budget. In June 2018, Baker directed the Massachusetts National Guard not to send any assets or personnel to the U.S.–Mexico border to assist the Trump administration in enforcing its "zero-tolerance policy" towards immigrants, citing the Trump Administration's family separation policy towards children as "cruel and inhumane."

Later the same week, Baker said that Massachusetts family resource centers were not aware of any families separated at the U.S.–Mexico border in Massachusetts at the time. The next month, the state legislature removed the sanctuary status amendment from the final version of the state budget, but included a provision to continue allowing Massachusetts juvenile courts to make decisions on granting legal status to children and young adults who entered the country illegally without a parent and under the age of 21. In October 2018, he voiced opposition to a proposal by President Trump to end birthright citizenship in the United States by executive order. In December 2018, Baker called for the suspension of a state district court judge who allegedly assisted an illegal immigrant in avoiding detention by an ICE agent during a legal proceeding from hearing further criminal cases until the federal investigation of the incident is concluded. In January 2019, he announced he would veto any bill that grants illegal immigrants driver's licenses.

=== Race and racism ===
In February 2017, Baker issued an executive order to reestablish the state's Black Advisory Commission to advise his administration on issues of concern to the black community in Massachusetts,

Later that August, following a white supremacist rally in Charlottesville, Virginia, Baker condemned the violence there as an act of terrorism, criticized Trump for his response to the incident, and referred to a similar rally scheduled for later in the same week on Boston Common. Baker said, "there is no place for that type of hatred" and that "those who engage in violent acts of any kind ... will be held responsible". The same week, after the New England Holocaust Memorial was vandalized for the second time that summer, Baker condemned the act as "disturbing and sad", expressed support for the state's Jewish community, and said that anyone engaging in vandalism would be fully prosecuted.

In June 2020, Baker signed a law making Juneteenth an official state holiday.

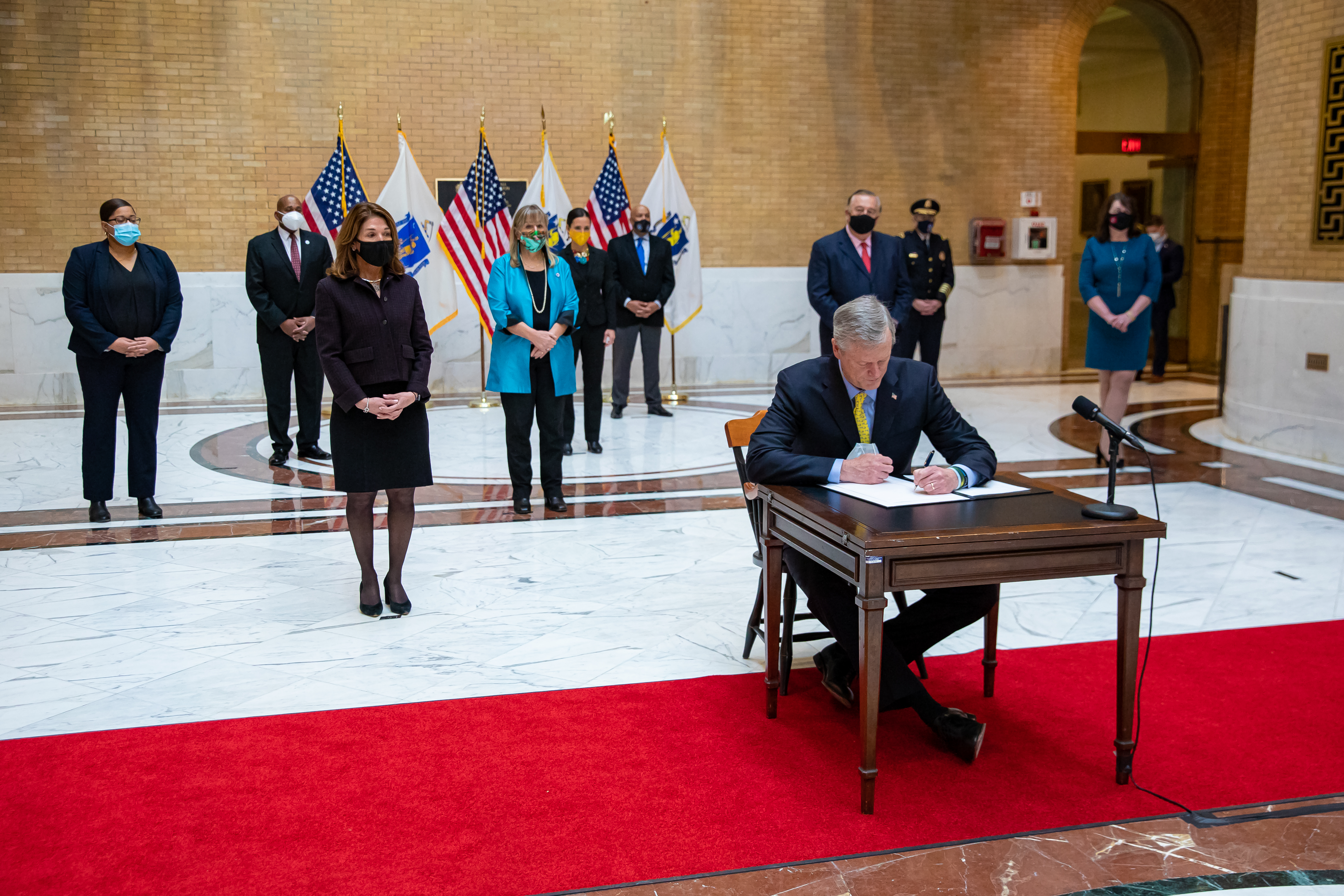
Baker signing "An Act Relative to Justice, Equity and Accountability in Law Enforcement in the Commonwealth" into law in December 2020

In December 2020, Baker signed into law "An Act Relative to Justice, Equity and Accountability in Law Enforcement in the Commonwealth", a bill created in response to Black Lives Matter protests calling for police reform across the country in the wake of the murder of George Floyd and the shooting of Breonna Taylor. He originally hesitated to sign the bill and sent it back to the legislature due to a provision that would create a civilian-led commission on police misconduct (six of its nine members would be civilians), saying, "I do not accept the premise that civilians know best how to train police". He also opposed the bill's ban on facial recognition technology. He signed the bill into law after compromising by limiting facial recognition technology, not banning it altogether.

=== LGBT rights ===
Baker supports same-sex marriage, stating after the U.S. Supreme Court decided the Obergefell v. Hodges case in June 2015, "I'm pleased the Commonwealth has already recognized same-sex marriages in our state, and with today's Supreme Court decision every American citizen across the nation will have equal protection under the law and the right to marry the person they choose." Although he once opposed the expansion of state anti-discrimination laws to protect transgender individuals in public restrooms, Baker later expressed opposition to a North Carolina law that eliminated such protections and then signed these protections into Massachusetts law on July 8, 2016. A 2018 statewide referendum upheld the law.

In February 2017, Baker criticized the Trump Administration's decision to rescind federal directives to public school districts allowing transgender public school students to use the bathroom of their preference, and the following month, Baker stated that he would not attend the South Boston Saint Patrick's Day parade that month if a gay veteran's group was not allowed to march in the parade. In October 2018, Baker gave the keynote speech at a fundraiser for the Log Cabin Republicans in Washington, D.C., and in the same month, Baker made a personal donation to the campaign for the 2018 ballot initiative to uphold the transgender protections law he signed in July 2016. In April 2019, Baker signed into law a bill banning conversion therapy for LGBT minors.

=== Opioid epidemic ===
In February 2015, Baker announced the formation of a working group to write a report formulating a statewide strategy to address the opioid epidemic in Massachusetts, which was released in June 2015. In the same month of the report's release, the Massachusetts Department of Public Health began a public awareness campaign on opioid addiction, and Baker announced a $34.5 million proposal following the working group's recommendations that included a $5.8 million program to move civil commitments for substance abuse from state prisons to state hospitals operated by the Massachusetts Executive Office of Health and Human Services, with Baker himself saying, "Opioid addiction is a health care issue that knows no boundaries across age, race, class or demographics."

In August 2015, the Coalition of Northeastern Governors under Baker's leadership as vice chair, sent an open letter to acting Food and Drug Administration Commissioner Stephen Ostroff recommending that the FDA require labeling changes for opioid analgesics packaging and an open letter to Canadian Health Minister Rona Ambrose urging the alignment of Health Canada's regulatory framework with the U.S. FDA's framework for oxycodone product guidelines. In September 2015, Baker met with the deans of the University of Massachusetts Medical School, Harvard Medical School, Boston University School of Medicine, and Tufts University School of Medicine, as well as the leadership of the Massachusetts Medical Society, to discuss improving medical school education on pain management in the state.

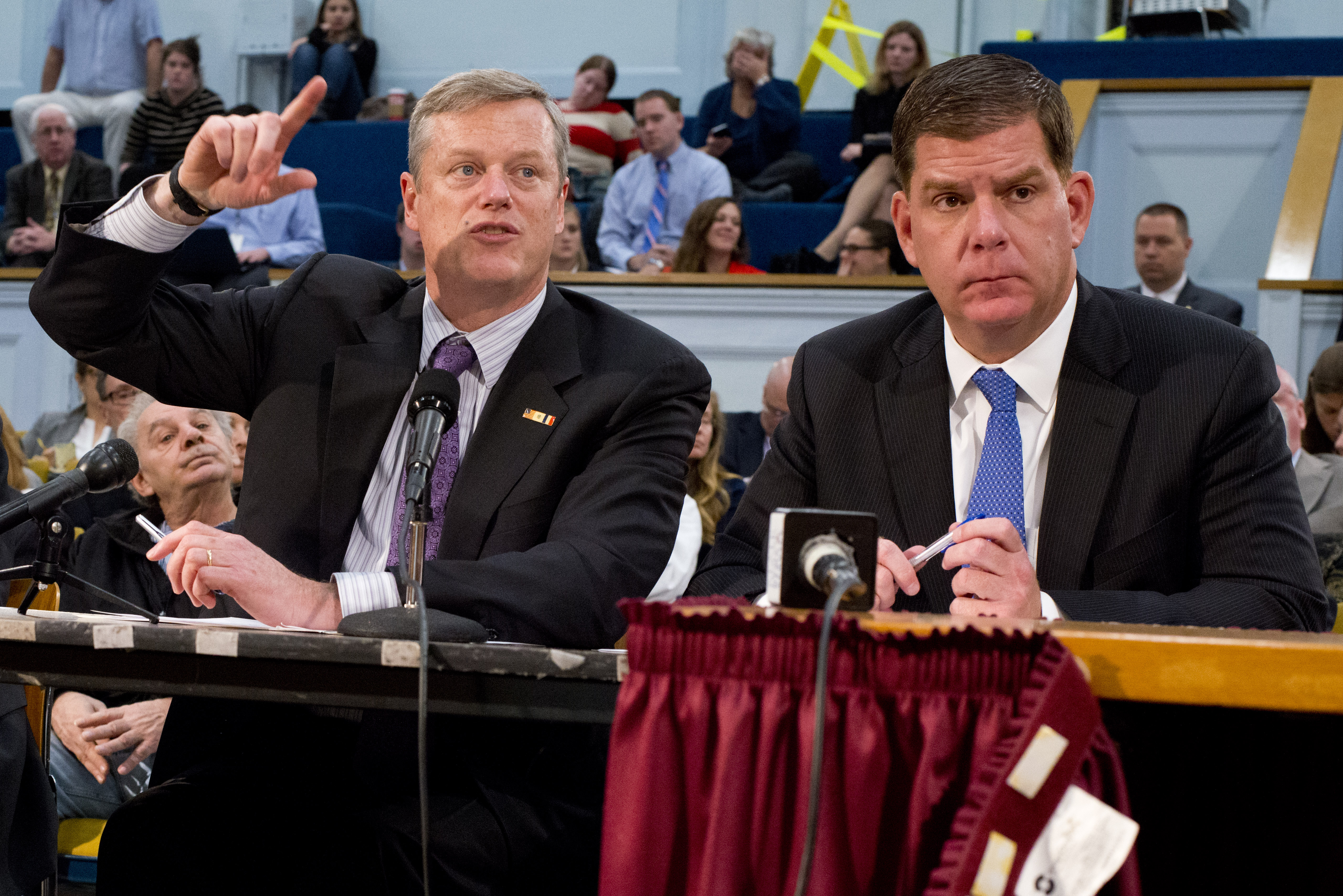
Baker (left) and Boston Mayor Marty Walsh testifying before a joint committee of the state legislature in support of Baker's opioid epidemic legislation

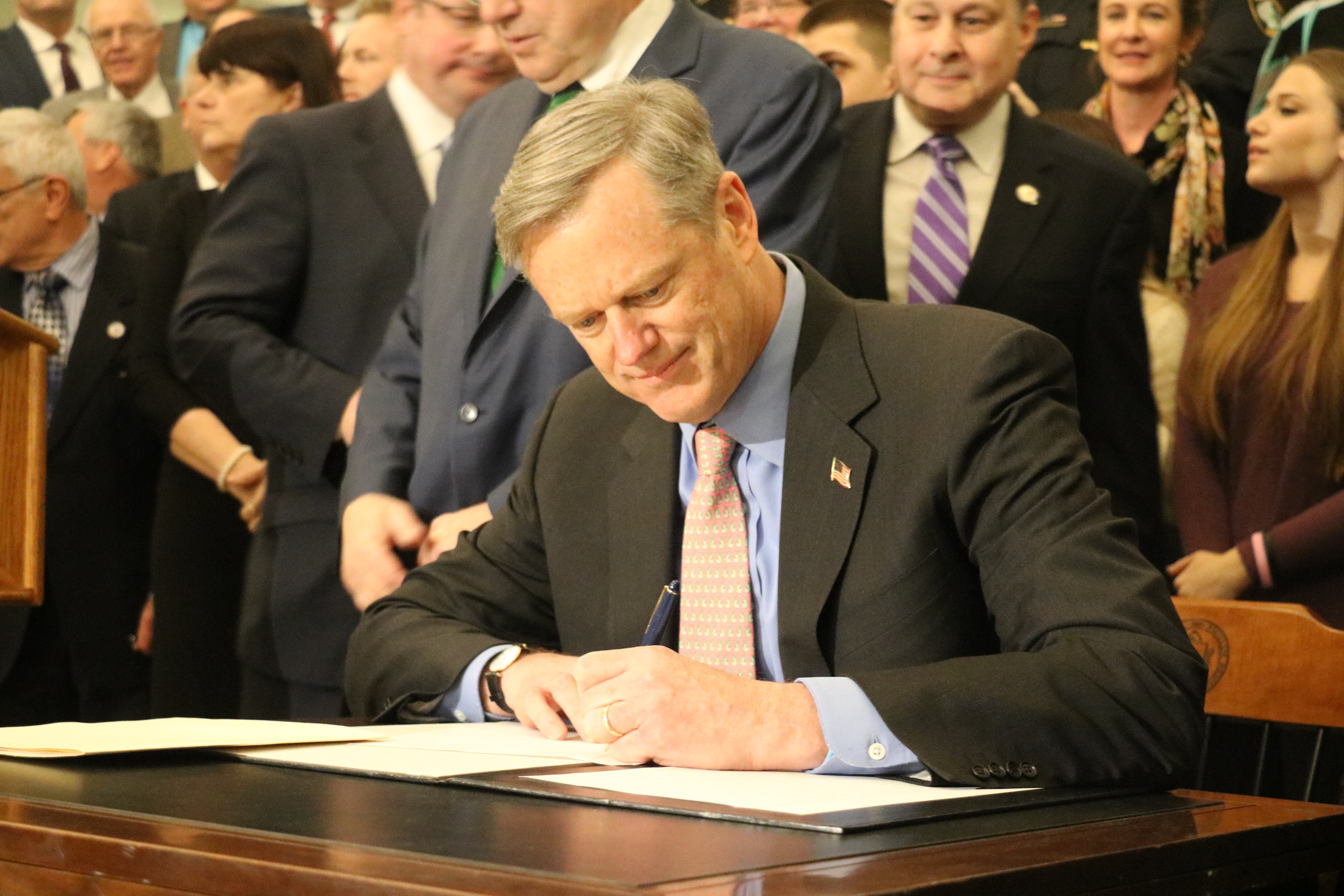
Baker signs legislation to address the opioid epidemic (March 2016)

In October 2015, Baker filed legislation to increase access to recovery high schools, provide and require training for parents, public school nurses, public school sports coaches and trainers on the dangers of opioid use, allow hospitals to involuntarily hold addiction patients for 72 hours while attempting to place them in treatment, and restrict first-time opioid prescriptions to a three-day supply. In November 2015, Baker and Boston Mayor Marty Walsh testified before the state legislature in support of the legislation, and the legislation received the endorsement of several Massachusetts county sheriffs, as well as Boston City Police Commissioner William B. Evans. A compromise version of the legislation would ultimately be passed and signed into law by Baker in March 2016.

In November 2015, Baker announced a statewide anti-stigma media campaign to combat stereotypes about drug addiction, a core competencies program in prevention and management of prescription drug misuse at the state's medical schools, and signed into law a bill making fentanyl trafficking a crime.

In January 2016, Baker's administration announced $6.8 million in grants to prescription drug misuse prevention programs for youth in 16 towns and $700,000 in grants to police and fire departments in more than 30 towns to facilitate bulk purchases of naloxone, and Baker signed into law a bill legally prohibiting the civil commitment of women for substance abuse to MCI Framingham and diverting those commitments to treatment centers, such as Taunton State Hospital. In February 2016, Baker announced $2.5 million in federal grants for opioid and heroin crime reduction to Massachusetts criminal justice agencies, as well as a core competencies program on prescription drug misuse at the state's dental schools, and Baker spoke in support of the Obama Administration's $1.1 billion proposal to expand access to treatment for drug addicts.

In March 2016, Baker spoke in support of new Centers for Disease Control opioid prescription guidelines, signed into law a bill repealing automatic driver's license suspensions for people convicted of drug crimes, In May 2016, Baker and Massachusetts Attorney General Maura Healey launched a statewide campaign to promote awareness of protection for people calling in drug overdoses under Good Samaritan laws. In June 2016, Baker met with the five other New England governors at a panel in Boston to coordinate reforms to address the opioid epidemic, such as setting limitations on opioid prescriptions, and the following month, Baker organized an interstate compact signed by 44 governors to agree adopting the same strategies for addressing the opioid epidemic modeled after the policies Baker has implemented in Massachusetts.

Also in July 2016, Baker's administration expanded the women's drug addiction program at Taunton State Hospital. In August 2016, Baker launched an improved version of the state's prescription monitoring program and expanded the state's core competencies program in prevention and management of prescription drug misuse to advanced practice nursing and physician assistant programs, as well as to training programs for employees at community health centers, and the following month, Baker announced a statewide medication disposal program at Walgreens pharmacies. In December 2016, Baker announced a pilot workers' compensation program to provide alternative treatments to opioids for workers with settled claims for on-the-job injuries.

In February 2017, the Massachusetts Department of Public Health released data showing that estimated opioid-related deaths had increased to nearly 2,000 during 2016, after increasing from estimates of under 1,400 in 2014 and to under 1,800 in 2015. In March 2017, Baker was appointed to the Trump Administration's Opioid and Drug Abuse Commission chaired by New Jersey Governor Chris Christie, and in June 2017, Baker attended the commission's first meeting. In April 2017, Baker announced additional funding aid for criminal justice agencies on opioid and heroin abuse reduction programs in Massachusetts gateway cities and Massachusetts received $12 million in federal funding for its opioid epidemic policies. Also in June 2017, Baker's administration awarded an additional $2.3 million in a second round of federal grants for opioid and heroin crime reduction to Massachusetts criminal justice agencies. In August 2017, Baker proposed increasing penalties for illegal drug distribution of substances that lead to death to a maximum of life imprisonment and a mandatory minimum sentence of five years, equivalent to vehicular manslaughter while intoxicated, and the following month, Baker's administration announced a pilot treatment and diversion program with the Worcester Police Department for low-level substance misuse.

In October 2017, Baker's administration extended the core competencies program on prescription drug misuse at the state's medical and dental schools to the state's nine social work schools, Baker traveled to the National Academy of Medicine in Washington, D.C., to speak at a panel discussion about the opioid epidemic, and Baker spoke in support of the Trump Administration's declaration of the opioid epidemic as a national public health emergency and called on the administration to fully fund the proposals of the Opioid and Drug Abuse Commission that Baker served on. In November 2017, the commission released its final report, the Massachusetts Department of Public Health released data showing opioid overdose deaths in Massachusetts declined by 10 percent over the first nine months of 2017, and Baker proposed an overhaul to the reforms he signed into law in March 2016.

In January 2018, Baker announced that CVS was adding drug disposal boxes to 42 pharmacies across the state, and Baker also proposed a separate bill to reintroduce a proposal that had been removed from the opioid legislation Baker signed into law in March 2016 to allow hospitals to involuntarily hold addiction patients for 72 hours while attempting to place them in treatment. Also in January 2018, Baker and Massachusetts Secretary of Health and Human Services Marylou Sudders testified before the state legislature on the overhaul bill he proposed the previous November, and during his testimony, Baker expressed skepticism about the effectiveness of supervised injection sites.

In February 2018, the Massachusetts Department of Public Health released data showing that opioid overdose deaths in Massachusetts fell by eight percent in 2017, and the following May, the Massachusetts Department of Public Health released further data showing the number of opioid overdose deaths in Massachusetts during the first three months of 2018 was 5 percent lower than during the first three months of 2017. In May 2018, Baker's administration announced that it had received a $11.7 million federal grant for opioid addiction prevention, treatment, and recovery programs. The following month, Baker's administration awarded nearly $1 million in first responder naloxone grants to 33 police and fire departments, and Baker spoke in support of a lawsuit filed by Massachusetts Attorney General Maura Healey on behalf of 670 Massachusetts residents against OxyContin manufacturer Purdue Pharma.

In August 2018, Baker signed into law a second comprehensive opioid bill that expanded access to naloxone and addiction treatment and recovery centers, required all opioid prescribers to convert to secure electronic prescriptions by 2020, and created a commission to study the effectiveness of supervised injection sites, involuntary commitments, and the credentialing of recovery coaches. In the same month, the Massachusetts Department of Public Health released a report stating that fentanyl was present in nearly 90 percent of the opioid overdose deaths in the state that year. In September 2018, the U.S. Department of Health and Human Services announced that Massachusetts would receive $50 million in federal funding to expand access to substance abuse and mental health services in the state.

The following month, Baker announced a statewide standing order from the Massachusetts Department of Public Health to allow pharmacies in the state to start dispensing naloxone without a prescription, and Baker proposed a $5 million pilot program to coordinate efforts at fentanyl trafficking enforcement by local police departments. In November 2018, the Massachusetts Taxpayers Foundation released a report estimating that the opioid epidemic had cost the state $15.2 billion in 2017 in lost labor and health-care or criminal justice related costs, and in the same month, the Massachusetts Department of Public Health released estimates showing that opioid overdose deaths were 1.3 percent lower during the first nine months of 2018 than during first nine months of 2017, but that opioid-related emergency medical service (EMS) incidents increased by 12 percent.

In February 2019, the Massachusetts Department of Public Health released estimates indicating that while opioid overdose deaths were 4 percent lower in 2018 than 2017, opioid-related EMS calls increased by 18 percent, and the following month, the commission enacted by Baker under the opioid legislation he signed the previous August released its final report. In November 2019, the Massachusetts Department of Public Health released estimates showing that opioid overdose deaths were 6 percent lower during the first nine months of 2019 than the first nine months of 2018, while the presence of fentanyl in opioid-related overdose deaths during the first six months of 2019 rose to an all-time high of 93 percent. In January 2020, the Centers for Disease Control released reports showing that drug overdose deaths declined nationally in 2018 for the first time since 1999 due to improved access to drug addiction treatment and to overdose emergency medical services, while the following month, the Massachusetts Department of Public Health released estimates showing that declines in the drug overdose death rate within Massachusetts slowed from 2018 to 2019.

== Boston Olympic bid ==
On the same day Massachusetts Governor Charlie Baker was inaugurated for his first term, the U.S. Olympic Committee announced that it was selecting Boston's bid to host the 2024 Summer Olympics for submission to the International Olympic Committee. Baker released a statement welcoming the announcement, while also saying that he was "looking forward to working with Mayor Walsh and the Boston 2024 organization to address the multitude of issues that need to be discussed, including keeping costs down and continuing to press forward on pledges of a privately funded Olympics as the process moves forward before the IOC." In June 2015, amidst declining public support and organized opposition to the bid, Baker and the leadership of the state legislature commissioned an independent analysis of the potential impacts of hosting the games performed by the Cambridge-based consulting firm The Brattle Group.

== See also ==
- 2015–2016 Massachusetts legislature
- 2017–2018 Massachusetts legislature
- 2019–2020 Massachusetts legislature
- 2021–2022 Massachusetts legislature
