= Massachusetts Executive Office of Health and Human Services =

Cabinet level agency under the Governor of Massachusetts

The Massachusetts Executive Office of Health and Human Services (EOHHS) is a Cabinet level agency under the Governor of Massachusetts. EOHHS is the largest secretariat in Massachusetts, and is responsible for the Medicaid program, child welfare, public health, disabilities, veterans’ affairs, and elder affairs. In total, EOHHS oversees 11 state agencies and the MassHealth Program.

The agency is under the supervision and control of the Secretary of Health and Human Services, who is appointed by the Governor.

== Leadership ==
The current Secretary of Health and Human Services is Kathleen E. Walsh, who was appointed by governor Maura Healey in 2023.

== Agencies ==
- Department of Children & Families
- Department of Developmental Services
- Executive Office of Aging and Independence
- Department of Mental Health
- Department of Public Health
- Department of Transitional Assistance
- Department of Youth Services
- Massachusetts Commission for the Blind
- Massachusetts Commission for the Deaf & Hard of Hearing
- MassAbility
- MassHealth
- Office for Refugees & Immigrants
