= Marylou Sudders =

American politician

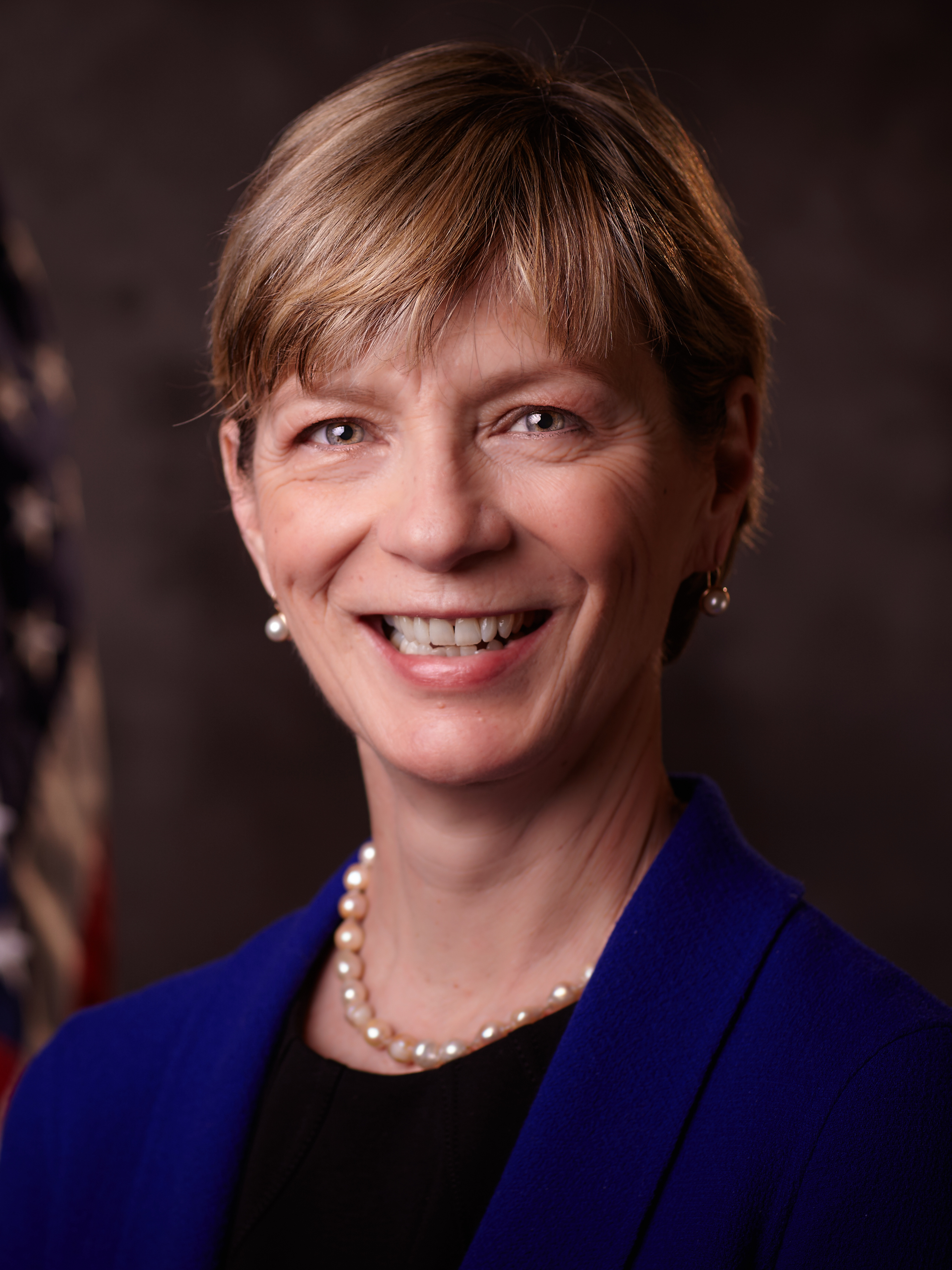
- Official portrait, 2015

Secretary of Health and Human Services of Massachusetts
- In office January 8, 2015 – January 5, 2023
- Preceded by: John Polanowicz
- Succeeded by: Kathleen E. Walsh

Personal details
- Born: 1957/1958 (Age 64/65)
- Spouse: Bradley Richardson (m. 2003)
- Education: Boston University (BA, MSW)
- Website: Government website

Marylou Sudders is an American former government official who served as Secretary of Health and Human Services of Massachusetts from January 8, 2015 to January 5, 2023.

== Career ==
On November 21, 2014, it was announced that Sudders would be appointed Secretary of Health and Human Services of Massachusetts, when Charlie Baker took office as Governor. succeeding John Polanowicz. She previously served as Massachusetts Commissioner of Mental Health, President & CEO of the Massachusetts Society for the Prevention of Cruelty to Children and New Hampshire's Deputy Director and Acting Director of the Division of Mental Health and Developmental Services.

On September 21, 2021 Sudders was added as a defendant to a lawsuit relating to the deaths of 83 people at the Holyoke Soldiers Home that died from incompetence at the facility that Sudders oversaw. The lawsuit stated that Sudders and her subordinates "turned a blind eye to what was happening at the home and acting with deliberate indifference to the risk posed by the pandemic, which led to the deaths of dozens of veterans." On Friday, May 13, 2022 the Commonwealth of Massachusetts settled the case for fifty-six million dollars. The United States Department of Justice had announced on April 10, 2020 they were also opening an investigation into the failures at the home.

Sudders left office at the end of the Baker–Polito administration and joined the lobbying, public policy, and consulting firm of Smith, Costello and Crawford.

Sudders holds a bachelor's degree with honors and a master's degree in social work from Boston University, and honorary doctorates from the Massachusetts School of Professional Psychology and Bridgewater State University.
