= Secretary of Health and Human Services of Massachusetts =

Government position

Massachusetts Secretary of Health and Human Services
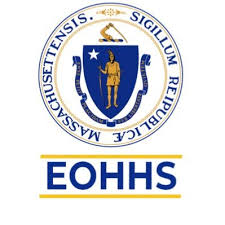
- Seal of the Department

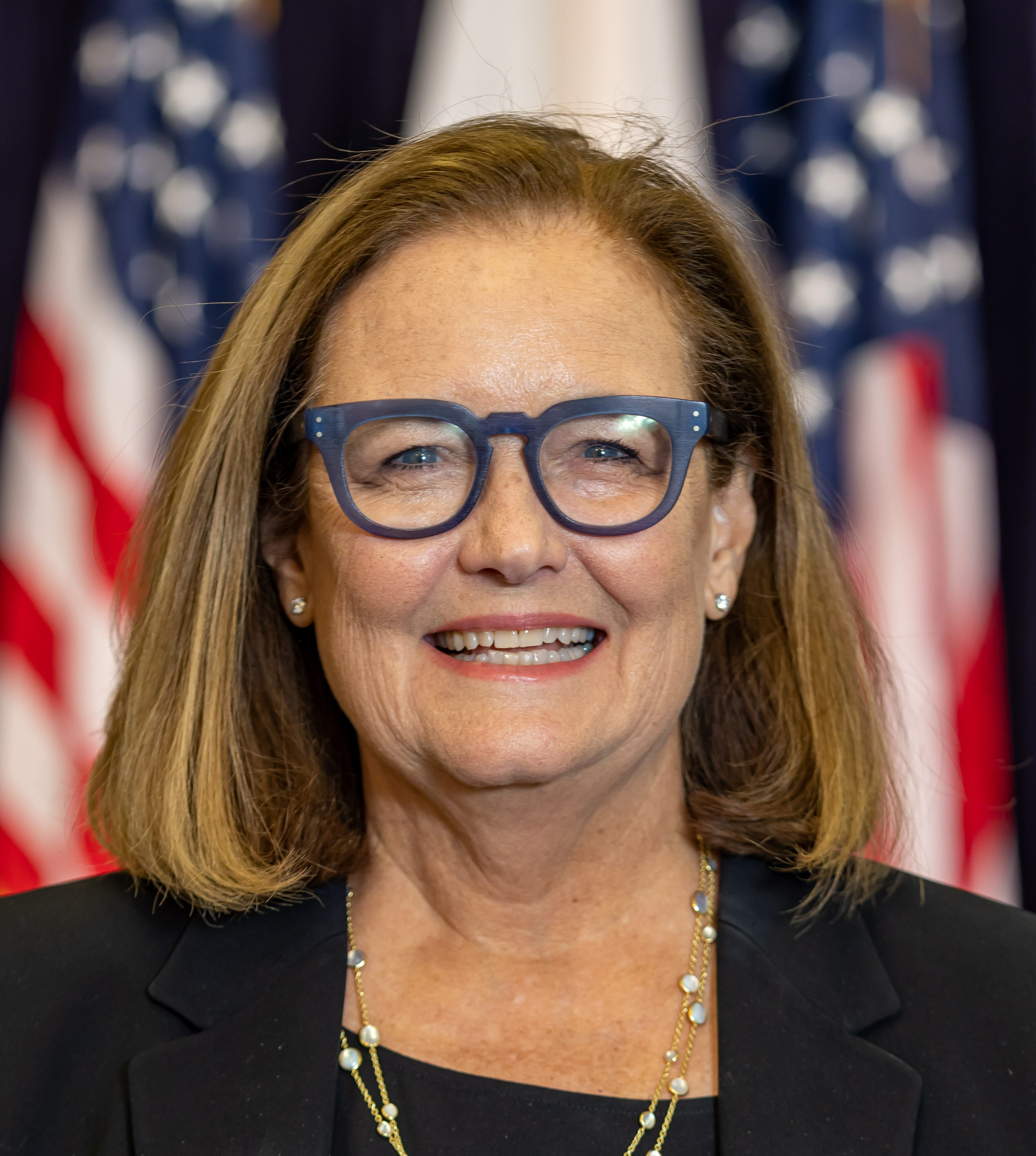
- Incumbent; Kathleen E. Walsh since January 25, 2023
- Massachusetts Executive Office of Health and Human Services
- Style: Madam Secretary (informal); The Honorable (formal)
- Member of: Massachusetts Cabinet
- Reports to: Governor of Massachusetts
- Appointer: Governor of Massachusetts
- Term length: No fixed term
- Website: www.mass.gov/info-details/governors-cabinet

The secretary of health and human services of Massachusetts is the head of the Massachusetts Executive Office of Health and Human Services, and serves as an advisor to the governor of Massachusetts. Its current secretary is Kathleen E. Walsh, who has been serving since January 25, 2023.

== Duties ==
The secretary oversees 12 agencies and MassHealth, with a combined budget of US$24 billion and 22,000 public employees, as of 2021.

=== Agencies ===
- Department of Children & Families
- Department of Developmental Services
- Department of Elder Affairs
- Department of Mental Health
- Department of Public Health
- Department of Transitional Assistance
- Department of Veterans' Services
- Department of Youth Services
- Massachusetts Commission for the Blind
- Massachusetts Commission for the Deaf & Hard of Hearing
- Massachusetts Rehabilitation Commission
- MassHealth
- Office of Diversity, Equal Opportunity and Civil Rights
- Office of Human Resources
- Office for Refugees & Immigrants
- Soldiers' Home in Chelsea
- Soldiers' Home in Holyoke
