= Massachusetts health care reform =

2006 healthcare reform law in Massachusetts

Commonwealth Health Insurance Connector Authority
- Connector Logo

Public authority overview
- Formed: April 12, 2006
- Type: Public-benefit nonprofit corporation
- Jurisdiction: Massachusetts
- Headquarters: Boston
- Public authority executives: Kathleen E. Walsh (Secretary of Health and Human Services of Massachusetts), Chair of the Board of Directors; Audrey Gasteier, Executive Director
- Website: www.mahealthconnector.org

The Massachusetts health care reform, commonly referred to as Romneycare, was a healthcare reform law passed in 2006 and signed into law by Governor Mitt Romney with the aim of providing health insurance to nearly all of the residents of the Commonwealth of Massachusetts.

The law mandated that nearly every resident of Massachusetts obtain a minimum level of insurance coverage, provided free and subsidized health care insurance for residents earning less than 150% and 300%, respectively, of the federal poverty level (FPL) and mandated employers with more than 10 full-time employees provide healthcare insurance.

Among its many effects, the law established an independent public authority, the Commonwealth Health Insurance Connector Authority, also known as the Massachusetts Health Connector. The Connector acts as an insurance broker to offer free, highly subsidized and full-price private insurance plans to residents, including through its web site. As such, it is one of the models of the Affordable Care Act's health insurance exchanges. The 2006 Massachusetts law successfully covered approximately two-thirds of the state's then-uninsured residents, half via federal-government-paid-for Medicaid expansion (administered by MassHealth) and half via the Connector's free and subsidized network-tiered health care insurance for those not eligible for expanded Medicaid. Relatively few Massachusetts residents used the Connector to buy full-priced insurance.

After implementation of the law, 98% of Massachusetts residents had health coverage. Despite the hopes of legislators, the program did not decrease total spending on healthcare or utilization of emergency medical services for primary care issues. The law was amended significantly in 2008 and twice in 2010 to make it consistent with the federal Affordable Care Act (ACA). Major revisions related to health care industry price controls were passed in August 2012, and the employer mandate was repealed in 2013 in favor of the federal mandate (even though enforcement of the federal mandate was delayed until January 2015).

== Background ==
The healthcare insurance reform law was enacted as Chapter 58 of the Acts of 2006 of the Massachusetts General Court; its long form title is An Act Providing Access to Affordable, Quality, Accountable Health Care. In October 2006, January 2007, and November 2007, bills were enacted that amended and made technical corrections to the statute (Chapters 324 and 450 of the Acts of 2006, and chapter 205 of the Acts of 2007).

The movement to reform Massachusetts healthcare insurance regulations and market between 2004 and 2006 was driven by multiple issues, not all of which were clearly an issue or directly related to then and now most critical issues of rising costs:

1. A six-year-old federal-government waiver as to how Massachusetts administered its Medicaid program was expiring. Unless the waiver was extended or amended, a large number of people would lose Medicaid coverage as the state reverted to Federal regulations.
2. Reforms made in 1997 to the portion of the insurance market that related to the individual purchase of insurance had failed. In 2000, over 100,000 Massachusetts residents (about 1.5% of the population) were covered by individually purchased insurance but the number had dropped to under 50,000 by the time of the reform debate.
3. As illustrated in the state report referenced in the previous sentence, the price of insurance that covered about 600,000 people in the small group market (about 10% of the population) was rising faster than the prices for the vast majority of the non-senior-citizen population, most of which were – and still are – covered by self-insured group insurance from large employers (self-insured plans are not subject to state regulation).
4. There was a widespread feeling that emergency rooms were misused for non-emergency medical care (the misuse was and is undeniable, not unique to Massachusetts, and continues; the relation to healthcare insurance or lack of it was less clear and apparently did/does not exist).
5. The taxes that fed the state's "free care pool", which covered uninsured emergency room visits as well as uninsured hospital admissions (as well as funding community health centers), consistently underfunded the pool and had to be raised almost annually (with differences made up by appropriations from general revenue). The combination of issues four and five was dubbed by Romney and others the free-rider problem although subsequent to the passage of the law, it is argued that the free-rider problem did not really exist. Almost all people who did not have insurance could not afford it, but since they were still using the good it is considered free riding.
6. Advocacy groups wanted a long list of non-traditionally covered (e.g., vision care) or under-covered (e.g., mood-altering pharmaceuticals) healthcare procedures and goods mandated.
7. Large employers—even large employers that were self-insured—were increasingly dropping health insurance as an employee benefit and/or restricting it to full-time employees such that the "take up rate" of healthcare insurance by employees was dropping. However, the drop in take-up rate actually accelerated after passage of the law although there is no demonstrable relationship between the law's passage and the accelerated drop.

Allegedly because of their lack of health insurance, uninsured Massachusetts residents commonly utilize emergency rooms as a source of primary care. The United States Congress passed the Emergency Medical Treatment and Active Labor Act (EMTALA) in 1986. EMTALA requires hospitals and ambulance services to provide care to anyone needing emergency treatment regardless of citizenship, legal status or ability to pay. EMTALA applies to virtually all hospitals in the U.S. but includes no provisions for reimbursement. EMTALA is therefore considered an "unfunded safety net program" for patients seeking care at the nation's emergency rooms. As a result of the 1986 EMTALA legislation, hospitals across the country faced unpaid bills and mounting expenses to care for the uninsured. Some of these uncompensated care costs are paid by the federal government through Medicare and Medicaid Disproportionate Share Hospital (DSH) funding, though such payments are scheduled to decrease to achieve savings to offset the costs of the Affordable Care Act.

In Massachusetts, a pool of over $1 billion in 2004/2005, funded by a tax on paying hospital customers and insurance premiums, known as the Uncompensated Care Pool (or "free care pool"), was used to partially reimburse hospitals and health centers for these ED expenses. A much larger portion of the pool was used for non-ED hospital care for the uninsured and for other care at Community Health Centers. It was predicted that implementation of the 2006 Massachusetts healthcare insurance reform law would result in almost complete elimination of the need for this fund. In 2006, MIT economics professor Jonathan Gruber predicted that the amount of money in the "free care pool" would be sufficient to pay for reform legislation without requiring additional funding or taxes.

== Reform coalitions ==
In November 2004, political leaders began advocating major reforms of the Massachusetts health care insurance system to expand coverage. First, the Senate President Robert Travaglini called for a plan to reduce the number of uninsured by half. A few days later, Governor Mitt Romney announced that he would propose a plan to cover virtually all the uninsured.

At the same time, the ACT (Affordable Care Today) Coalition introduced a bill that expanded MassHealth (Medicaid and SCHIP) coverage and increased health coverage subsidy programs and required employers to either provide coverage or pay an assessment to the state. The coalition began gathering signatures to place their proposal on the ballot in November 2006 if the legislature did not enact comprehensive health care reform, resulting in the collection of over 75,000 signatures on the MassACT ballot proposal. The Blue Cross Blue Shield Foundation sponsored a study, "Roadmap to Coverage," to expand coverage to everyone in the Commonwealth.

Attention focused on the House when then-Massachusetts House Speaker Salvatore DiMasi, speaking at a Blue Cross Blue Shield Foundation Roadmap To Coverage forum in October 2005, pledged to pass a bill through the House by the end of the session. At the forum, the Foundation issued a series of reports on reform options, all of which included an individual mandate. At the end of the month, the Joint Committee on Health Care Financing approved a reform proposal crafted by House Speaker DiMasi, Committee co-chair Patricia Walrath, and other House members. The state faced pressure from the federal government to make changes to the federal waiver that allows the state to operate an expanded Medicaid program. Under the existing waiver, the state was receiving $385 million in federal funds to reimburse hospitals for services provided to the uninsured. The free care pool had to be restructured so that individuals, rather than institutions, received the funding. U.S. Senator Ted Kennedy, a longtime advocate for universal healthcare, and Romney met with outgoing U.S. Health and Human Services Secretary Tommy Thompson on January 14, 2005, Thompson's last day in office. The meeting resulted in Thompson signing a Medicare waiver that would redirect money that previously went to treat uninsured patients at safety net hospitals to near-universal health insurance coverage as proposed by Travaglini.

== Legislation ==
In Fall 2005, the House and Senate each passed health care insurance reform bills. The legislature made a number of changes to Governor Romney's original proposal, including expanding MassHealth (Medicaid and SCHIP) coverage to low-income children and restoring funding for public health programs. The most controversial change was the addition of a provision which requires firms with 11 or more workers that do not provide "fair and reasonable" health coverage to their workers to pay an annual penalty. This contribution, initially $295 annually per worker, is intended to equalize the free care pool charges imposed on employers who do and do not cover their workers.

On April 12, 2006, Governor Romney signed the health legislation. He vetoed eight sections of the health care legislation, including the controversial employer assessment. He vetoed provisions providing dental benefits to poor residents on the Medicaid program, and providing health coverage to legal immigrants who have a U.S. sponsor who is financially responsible for them. The legislature promptly overrode six of the eight gubernatorial section vetoes, on May 4, 2006, and by mid-June 2006 had overridden the remaining two.

== Statute ==
The enacted statute, Chapter 58 of the Acts of 2006, established a system to require individuals, with a few exceptions, to obtain health insurance.

Chapter 58 had several key provisions: the creation of the Health Connector; the establishment of the subsidized Commonwealth Care Health Insurance Program; the employer Fair Share Contribution and Free Rider Surcharge; and a requirement that each individual must show evidence of coverage on their income tax return or face a tax penalty, unless coverage was deemed unaffordable by the Health Connector.

The statute expanded MassHealth (Medicaid and SCHIP) coverage for children of low income parents and restores MassHealth benefits like dental care and eyeglasses. The legislation included a merger of the individual (non-group) insurance market into the small group market to allow individuals to get lower group insurance rates. The process of merging the two markets also froze the market for such insurance for a short period in April–May 2010 as the current government tried to keep the leading non-profit insurers, which insure over 90% of the residents, in the state from raising premiums for small businesses and individuals. Eventually the state's non-partisan insurance board ruled that the government did not have the actuarial data or right to freeze the premiums. Five of the non-profit insurers then settled for slightly lower premium increases than they had initially requested rather than litigate further. The sixth litigated and won the right to implement all its original increases retroactively. Payment rates were supposed to be increased to hospitals and physicians under the statute but that has not happened. The statute also formed a Health Care Quality and Cost Council to issue quality standards and publicize provider performance.

=== Commonwealth Health Insurance Connector Authority ===
The Health Connector is designed as a clearinghouse for insurance plans and payments. It performed the following functions:

- It administers the ConnectorCare program for low-income residents (up to 300% of the FPL) who do not qualify for MassHealth and who meet certain eligibility guidelines.
- It offers for purchase health insurance plans for individuals who:
  - are not working,
  - are employed by a small business (less than 50 employees) that uses the Health Connector to offer health insurance. These residents will purchase insurance with pre-tax income.
  - are not qualified under their large employer plan,
  - are self-employed, part-time workers, or work for multiple employers,
- It sets premium subsidy levels for ConnectorCare.
- It defines "affordability" for purposes of the individual mandate.

=== Employer taxes ===
Employers with more than ten full-time equivalent employees (FTEs) must provide a "fair and reasonable contribution" to the premium of health insurance for employees. Employers who do not will be assessed an annual fair share contribution that will not exceed $295 per employee per year. The fair share contribution will be paid into the Commonwealth Care Trust Fund to fund Commonwealth Care and other health reform programs.

The Division of Health Care Finance and Policy defined by regulation what contribution level meets the "fair and reasonable" test in the statute. The regulation imposes two tests. First, employers are deemed to have offered "fair and reasonable" coverage if at least 25% of their full-time workers are enrolled in the firm's health plan. Alternatively, a company meets the standard if it offers to pay at least 33% of the premium cost of an individual health plan. For employers with 50 or more FTEs, both standards must be met, or 75% of full-time workers must be enrolled in the firm's health plan. Regulatory and analytic information is available on the Division's website.

There was an additional Free Rider Surcharge assessible to the employer. This surcharge is different from the fair share contribution. The surcharge is applied when an employer does not arrange for a pre-tax payroll deduction system for health insurance (a Section 125 plan, or a "cafeteria plan"), and has employees who receive care that is paid from the uncompensated care pool, renamed in October 2007 as the Health Safety Net.

=== Individual taxes ===
Residents of Massachusetts must have health insurance coverage under Chapter 58. Residents must indicate on their tax forms if they had insurance on December 31 of that tax year, had a waiver for religious reasons, or had a waiver from the Connector. The Connector waiver can be obtained if the resident demonstrates that there is no available coverage that is defined by the Connector as affordable. In March 2007, the Connector adopted an affordability schedule that allows residents to seek a waiver. If a resident does not have coverage and does not have a waiver, the Department of Revenue will enforce the insurance requirement by imposing a penalty. In 2007, the penalty was the loss of the personal exemption. Beginning in 2008, the penalty is half the cost of the lowest available yearly premium which will be enforced as an assessed addition to the individual's income tax.

=== Young adult coverage ===
Beginning July 2007, the Connector offered reduced benefit plans for young adults up to age 26 who do not have access to employer-based coverage.

=== Changes to the law ===
In 2008 and 2010, much more substantive changes were made to the law, one of the most important of which was to begin an open enrollment period for those receiving subsidized health insurance and anyone buying insurance, including those paying full price, as an individual. Prior to that 2010 change, under the Massachusetts law, residents buying healthcare insurance individually could do so at any time, even—theoretically—as being admitted to a hospital or entering an emergency room. This led to a gaming of the system and research by the state said this gaming added 1–2% to premium costs, which were continuing to rise for other reasons as well. Given the continuing overall rise in premiums post Massachusetts 2006 healthcare insurance reform, the major goal of the 2012 amendment was to introduce price controls on health care itself; it is not directly related to healthcare insurance as are the earlier legislative actions.

Starting in 2014, Commonwealth Care insurance (and Commonwealth Choice insurance for those not receiving subsidies) has been replaced by insurance compatible with the federal Patient Protection and Affordable Care Act. Among other differences, consistent with PPACA, the out of pocket spending limits and deductibles are higher under similarly priced (after a PPACA tax credit) PPACA-consistent insurance than the superseded Massachusetts insurance law. To try to compensate for these higher limits and deductibles, the Commonwealth funded an additional insurance program called Connectorcare, by which residents who previously would have qualified for Commonwealth Care can get very similar benefits for about the same price.

== Implementation ==
The implementation of healthcare insurance reform began in June 2006, with the appointment of members of the Connector board and the naming of Jon Kingsdale, a Tufts Health Plan official, as executive director of the Connector. On July 1, MassHealth began covering dental care and other benefits, and began enrolling children between 200% and 300% of the poverty level. The federal Centers for Medicare and Medicaid Services approved the state's waiver application on July 26, 2006, allowing the state to begin enrolling 10,500 people from the waitlist for the MassHealth Essential program, which provides Medicaid coverage to long-term unemployed adults below the poverty line. In 2006, the Division of Health Care Finance and Policy issued regulations defining "fair and reasonable" for the fair share assessment. The regulations provide that companies with 11 or more full-time equivalent employees will meet the "fair and reasonable" test if at least 25 percent of those employees are enrolled in that firm's health plan and the company is making a contribution toward it. A business that fails that test may still be deemed to offer a "fair and reasonable" contribution if the company offers to pay at least 33 percent of an individual's health insurance premium.

Also effective in 2006, the Connector Board set premium levels and copayments for the state subsidized Commonwealth Care plans. Premiums will vary from $18 per month, for individuals with incomes 100–150% of the poverty line, to $106 per month for individuals with incomes 250–300% of poverty. The Connector approved two copayment schemes for plans for people 200–300% of poverty. One plan will have higher premiums and lower copayments, while a second choice will have lower premiums and higher copayments. Four managed care plans began offering Commonwealth Care on November 1, 2006. Coverage for people above 100% of poverty up to 300% of poverty began on February 1, 2007. As of December 1, 2007, around 158,000 people had been enrolled in Commonwealth Care plans. Initial bids received by the Connector showed a likely cost for the minimum insurance plan of about $380 per month. The Connector rejected those bids, and asked insurers to propose less expensive plans. New bids were announced on March 3, 2007. The Governor announced that "the average uninsured Massachusetts resident will be able to purchase health insurance for $175 per month." But plan costs will vary greatly depending on the plan selected, age and geographic location, ranging from just over $100 per month for plans for young adults with high copayments and deductibles to nearly $900 per month for comprehensive plans for older adults with low deductibles and copayments. Copayments, deductibles and out-of-pocket contributions may vary among plans. The proposed minimum creditable coverage plan would have a deductible no higher than $2,000 per individual, $4,000 per family, and would limit out-of-pocket expenses to a $5,000 maximum for an individual and $7,500 for a family. Before the deductible applies, the proposed plan includes preventive office visits with higher copayments, but would not include emergency room visits if the person was not admitted.

The new plan covered abortions (both elective and medically necessary) in the heavily Catholic state.

== Outcomes prior to ACA ==
The number of uninsured Massachusetts residents dropped from about 6% in 2006 to about 2% in 2010, before increasing to between 3–4% in 2012. The United States Census Department shows a higher percentage of uninsured for the same years but a similar trend line. Both trend lines mirror the approximately 400,000 residents added to the rolls of the insured in 2006/2007 via an expansion in Medicaid eligibility rules and the subsidization of the Commonwealth Care insurance program. A 2011 view of the data, released by the state in 2013, shows the number of people receiving employer-sponsored insurance (ESI) in Massachusetts decreased by approximately 500,000 people (about 8% of the state population) since the enactment of the Massachusetts health insurance law in 2006. The latest U.S. Census data on health care insurance types in Massachusetts was released in September 2012, and also illustrates the long-term decrease in ESI, and an increase in public, free and subsidized insurance.

In the early years of the implementation of the law, approximately 2% of those eligible were determined not to have had access to affordable insurance, and a small number opted for a religious exemption to the mandate. Approximately 1% of taxpayers were determined by the Commonwealth to have had access to affordable insurance during tax year 2009 and had to pay an income tax penalty instead.

Comparing the first half of 2007 to the first half of 2009, spending from the state's Health Safety Net Fund dropped 38–40% as more people became insured, before increasing in later years. The Fund—which replaced the Uncompensated Care Pool or Free Care—pays for medically necessary health care for those who do not have health insurance. According to the DHCFP in a report dated September 2011, "Total Health Safety Net (HSN) payments increased by 7% in the first six months of Health Safety Net fiscal year 2011 (HSN11) compared to the same period in the prior year while demand increased by 10%. Demand represents the amount that providers would have been paid in the absence of a funding shortfall. Because HSN11 demand is expected to exceed HSN11 funding, hospital providers experienced a $38 million shortfall during the first six months of HSN11." Versus the same period two years earlier, HSN spending plus demand has increased 20%

The reduced state Health Safety Net payments anticipated (but not realized) that by reducing the number of uninsured people, Commonwealth Care would reduce the amount of charity care provided by hospitals. In a subsequent story that same month, The Boston Globe reported that Commonwealth Care faced a short-term funding gap of $100 million and the need to obtain a new three-year funding commitment from the federal government of $1.5 billion. By June 2011, enrollment was projected to grow to 342,000 people at an annual expense of $1.35 billion. The original projections were for the program to ultimately cover approximately 215,000 people at a cost of $725 million.

According to the DHCFP, 89,000 people bought healthcare insurance directly as of June 2009, up from 40,000 in June 2006. The number of people with group insurance in Massachusetts held steady at around 4,400,000 since passage of the health care reform law, according to the DHCFP. One outcome has been the unavailability of coverage by many insurers previously doing business in Massachusetts.

A study published in The American Journal of Medicine, "Medical Bankruptcy in Massachusetts: Has Health Reform Made a Difference?", compared bankruptcy filers from 2007, before reforms were implemented, to those filing in the post-reform 2009 environment to see what role medical costs played. The study found that: 1) From 2007 to 2009, the total number of medical bankruptcies (defined as due to unpaid medical bills or to loss of income due to illness, with no distinction between those causes) in Massachusetts increased by more than one third, from 7,504 to 10,093; and 2) Illness and medical costs contributed to 59.3% of bankruptcies in 2007 and 52.9% in 2009. The researchers note that the 2008 financial crisis likely contributed to the increased number of bankruptcies, and Massachusetts' increase in medical bankruptcies over the 2007–2009 period was nevertheless below the national average rate of increase. Still, the researchers explain that health costs continued to go up over the period in question, and their overall findings are "incompatible with claims that health reform has cut medical bankruptcy filings significantly." A 2015 study found that the law had "modest effects" on costs of outpatient care for people who were already insured. According to a 2016 study in the American Economic Journal, the reform "reduced the amount of debt that was past due, improved credit scores, reduced personal bankruptcies and reduced third-party collections." The authors note that the "results show that health care reform has implications that extend well beyond the health of those who gain insurance coverage."

In 2010, The Boston Globe reported that more than a thousand people in Massachusetts had "gamed" the mandate/penalty provision of the law since implementation by choosing to be insured only a few months a year, typically when in need of a specific medical procedure. On the average, the Globe reported, these part-time enrollees were paying $1,200–$1,600 in premiums over a few months and receiving $10,000 or more in healthcare services before again dropping coverage.

A study conducted by the Urban Institute and released in December 2010 by the Massachusetts Division of Health Care Finance and Policy stated that as of June 2010, 98.1 percent of state residents had coverage. This compared to 97.3 percent having coverage in the state in 2009 and 83.3 percent having coverage nationwide. Among children and seniors the 2010 coverage rate was even higher, at 99.8 percent and 99.6 percent respectively. The breakdown of insurance coverage consisted of that 65.1 percent of state residents being covered by employers, 16.4 percent by Medicare, and 16.6 percent via public plans such as Commonwealth Care. The state's Secretary of Health and Human Services, JudyAnn Bigby, said, "Massachusetts' achievements in health care reform have been nothing short of extraordinary. With employers, government and individuals all sharing the responsibility of reform, we continue to have the highest insurance rate in the nation." In June 2011, a Boston Globe review concluded that the healthcare overhaul "has, after five years, worked as well as or better than expected." A study by the fiscally conservative Beacon Hill Institute was of the view that the reform was "responsible for a dramatic increase in health care spending," however.

In 2012, the Blue Cross Foundation of Massachusetts funded and released research that showed that the 2006 law and its subsequent amendments – simply in terms of measuring the state-budget effect on the uncompensated care pool and funding subsidized insurance had cost approximately $2 billion in fiscal year 2011 versus approximately $1 billion in fiscal year 2006. Some of this doubling in cost was funded by temporary grants and waivers from the United States federal government. The Blue Cross funded research did not address the increased costs in premiums for employers and individuals or other market dynamics – such as increased providers' costs and increased co-pays/deductibles – necessary to meet minimum creditable coverage standards that were introduced in Massachusetts by other parts of the 2006 legislature and its resulting regulations. Separate research on Premiums and Expenditures found that fully adjusted premiums per member per month (PPMPM) for Massachusetts residents covered by comprehensive private insurance policies (approximately two thirds of the state population) increased approximately 9% in both 2009 and 2010 for subscribers in the "merged market", 7% in the midsized group market, and 5.4% in the large group market. These premium increase do not reflect actual resident experience particularly in the merged market because Massachusetts regulations allow age and other rating factors (e.g., even if premiums were held flat for 55-year-olds living on Cape Cod in construction work from year to year, the 55-year-old in 2009 would pay 10% more in 2010 for the same policy, possibly with lesser benefits).

During the years before the changes in the state law related to the enactment of the federal PPACA, the state still used the free care pool—renamed the Health Safety Net—both as originally intended and to fund the subsidies for free (under 150% of FPL) and almost free (151–300% of FPL) networked health care insurance. In addition the state spent a substantial amount of general revenue on the insurance reform. Based on the combination of the increased Health Safety Net tax, general revenue (state income and sales taxes were increased 20%) and smaller additional taxes, the cost of the reform reached about 2% of the state's annual budget in fiscal year 2013, which ended June 30, 2013, up from 1.5% in fiscal 2011.

Data following enactment of mandatory insurance showed total emergency visits and spending continued to increase, and low-severity emergency visits decreased less than 2%; researchers concluded, "To the extent that policymakers expected a substantial decrease in overall and low-severity ED visits, this study does not support those expectations." Other analysis concluded that preventable ED visits were reduced 5-8% for non-urgent or primary care ED visits relative to other states. A more complete report released in January 2012 found between 2006 and 2010 emergency department visits and non-urgent visits had dropped 1.9 and 3.8% respectively. A 2014 study found that the law was associated with "a small but consistent increase" in ED use in the state. A 2014 study found that the reform was associated with "significant reductions in all-cause mortality and deaths from causes amenable to health care."

=== Transition to ACA ===
At the point of the implementation of PPACA in 2014, of those citizens acquiring insurance through pre-ACA Massachusetts Health Connector plans, approximately 100,000 Massachusetts residents who received free or highly subsidized CommonWealth Care insurance, were expected be needed to be moved to Medicaid. The number of available plans under the Affordable Care Act that will offer service beginning on January 1, 2014, rose to more than 100 from just under 100 in 2013. The open enrollment period of the insurance marketplace, during which citizens may re-enroll or purchase, lasted from 1 October 2013 to 31 March 2014, but those who did not re-enroll by December 15, were to have no insurance coverage in January 2014 (unless they were among the 100,000 moved to Medicaid).

At the start of the Affordable Care act open enrollment at the end of 2013, there was a major technical failure, and the MA Health Connector Software did not work at all.

To handle this problem, a special temporary Medicaid was set up, and given to over 320,000 people at no immediate cost to them, who would have under normal ACA procedures gotten either a traditional Medicaid, an ACA expanded Medicaid, or an ACA on-exchange plan.

The MA Health Connector was functional starting at open enrollment for 2015, though problems were still widely reported.

== Outcomes following transition to ACA ==
According to the Kaiser Family Foundation, in 2019 the state's uninsured rate was about 3%, which at the time was the lowest in the country. Though 22% still have trouble paying their medical bills, "with many complaining that high-deductible health plans come with steep out-of-pocket costs."

In 2022, the following carriers offer plans through the Massachusetts Health Connector insurance marketplace:

- AllWays Health Partners (formerly Neighborhood Health Plan)
- Blue Cross Blue Shield of Massachusetts (BCBSMA)
- Boston Medical Center/BMC HealthNet Plan (BMCHP)
- Fallon Community Health Plan
- Harvard Pilgrim Health Care (HPHC)
- Health New England (HNE)
- Tufts (two separate entities: Tufts HMO and Tufts Health Public Plan)
- UnitedHealthcare

== Fountas v. Dormitzer ==
A legal challenge was filed in the Superior Court of Essex County, contesting the fine imposed for a citizen's failure to get health insurance as well as the fine imposed for a failure to provide information on a tax return as to whether that citizen had health insurance. The judge dismissed the case upon a motion filed by an assistant to Attorney General Martha Coakley for failure to state a case upon which relief can be granted. A petition for a writ of mandamus to the Massachusetts Supreme Judicial Court (SJC), ordering Essex Superior Court to vacate this dismissal on procedural grounds, the failure to provide trial by jury in a dispute over property as requested by the plaintiff, was denied by Associate Justice Spina. An appeal was then filed with the Massachusetts Appeals Court. A later petition for a writ of mandamus with the SJC was also denied, this time by Chief Justice Ireland. The Appeals Court then heard the appeal and declined to send the case back to Essex Superior Court for trial by jury based on their belief that no facts needed to be determined and therefore trial by jury in this case was not a protected right under either the US or Massachusetts Constitutions. The SJC declined to hear any further appeals.

== Transition from fee-for-service to accountable care ==
In November 2016, MassHealth received a federal Medicare waiver that allowed it to transition from fee-for-service payment to the use of accountable care organizations, expected to begin operation in December 2017. This expanded the similar One Care prevention-oriented program for Massachusetts patients who were enrolled in both Medicare and Medicaid, or had disabilities or very low income.
