= Bipartisan Health Care Stabilization Act of 2017 =

Proposed United States legislation

CBO report on the Bipartisan Health Care Stabilization Act of 2017

The Bipartisan Health Care Stabilization Act of 2017 (colloquially known as the Alexander-Murray bill) was a 2017 proposed compromise reached by senator and HELP Committee chairman Lamar Alexander and senator and HELP Committee ranking member Patty Murray to amend the Affordable Care Act to fund cost-sharing reductions subsidies. The plan will also provide more flexibility for state waivers, allow a new "Copper Plan" or catastrophic coverage for those under 30, allow interstate insurance compacts, and redirect consumer fees to states for outreach. President Trump had stopped paying the cost sharing subsidies and the Congressional Budget Office estimated his action would cost $200 billion, cause insurance sold on the exchange to cost 20% more and cause one million people to lose insurance.

== Background ==
The CSR subsidies are paid to insurance companies to reduce copayments and deductibles for a smaller group of ACA enrollees, those earning less than 250% of the federal poverty line (FPL). They are meant to reduce the cost for enrollees in this income bracket that are on silver plans while increasing the actuarial value of the plans. For example, in 2016 the maximum out of pocket for an individual on a silver plan was $6,850, but for individuals with an income up to 200 percent of the FPL, that maximum cost was reduced to $2,250. Simultaneously, these CSR payments were able to increase the actuarial value of a silver plan from 70 percent to 87 percent for those with incomes between 150 and 200 percent of the poverty line. 56 percent of all marketplace enrollees were receiving CSRs as of 2015.

Premium tax credits are the other main subsidy in the ACA, representing a much larger portion of ACA spending, and they were designed to reduce the post-subsidy cost of monthly premiums, apply to all enrollees earning less than 400% of the FPL. For scale, during 2017, approximately $7 billion in CSR subsidies will be paid, versus $34 billion for the premium tax credits.

Under the Obama administration, these cost sharing reduction payments were paid out because the Department of Health and Human Services argued that the premium tax credits and the cost sharing reductions were "economically and programmatically integrated" in the Affordable Care Act, and so the appropriation that covers the premium tax credits also allowed HHS to pay CSR payments. However, the House of Representatives sued the Administration over this, arguing that the lack of an explicit appropriation for CSRs means that the payments can not be made. The decision in this case, House of Representatives v. Burwell, was that CSRs required a specific appropriation, but stayed any cancellation of CSR payments if and when appeals to the decision were made. The arguments made in this case became the backdrop for why the Trump Administration would cancel these payments.

== Trump Administration actions on CSRs ==
On October 12, 2017, after months of speculation, the Trump Administration announced that they were discontinuing the cost sharing reduction payments, claiming that the payments were unconstitutionally circumventing the legislative appropriations process. This was among the actions taken by President Trump to start to dismantle the Affordable Care Act after Congress had failed to repeal it earlier in 2017. Trump had received warnings against this move from members of both parties, including one Republican senator who told him that the Republican Party would effectively “own health care” as a political issue if the president cancelled the CSR payments, but he moved forward with it anyway.

=== CBO estimate of impact of ending CSR payments ===
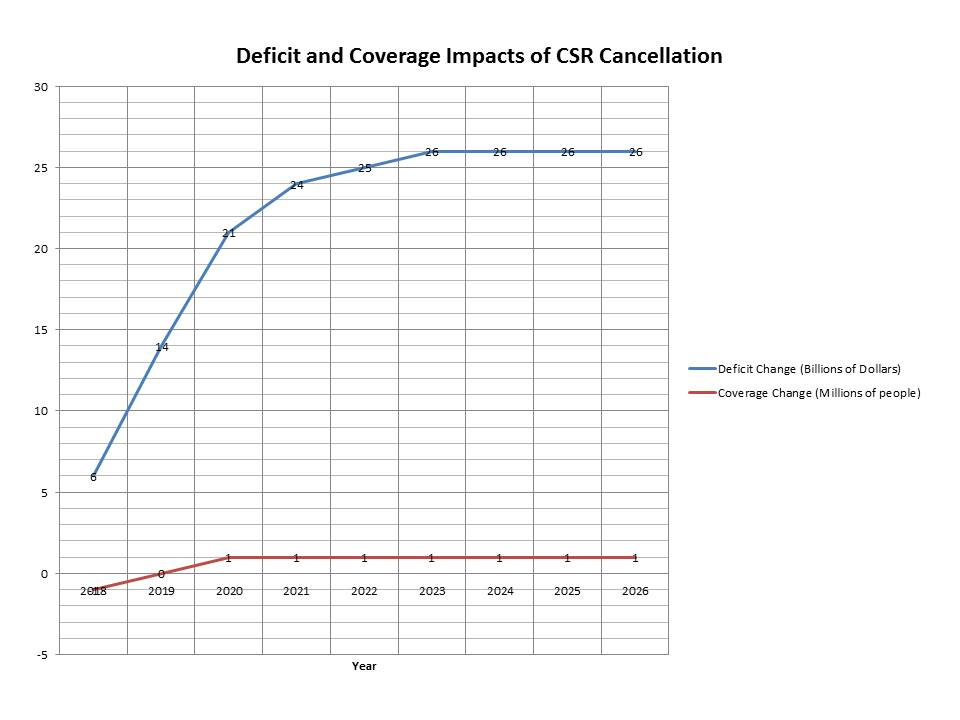
CBO projected impacts of cancellation of CSR payments on the federal deficit and health insurance coverage

The CBO reported in August 2017 (prior to President Trump's decision) that ending the CSR payments would increase ACA premiums by about 20 percentage points in 2018, with a resulting increase of nearly $200 billion in the budget deficit over a decade, as the premium tax credit subsidies would rise along with premium prices to cover the additional costs not subsidized by the CSRs. CBO also estimated that initially up to one million fewer would have health insurance coverage, although coverage may increase in the long-run as the premium subsidies increase. This initial drop would be due in part to the fact that insurers would leave some markets due to the instability and risk of unknown costs, leaving about 5 percent of people living in areas with no insurers in 2018. CBO expected the exchanges to remain fairly stable (e.g., no "death spiral") as premiums would increase and prices would stabilize at the higher (non-CSR) level.

CBO estimated that of the 12 million with private insurance via the ACA exchanges in 2017, about 10 million receive premium tax credit subsidies and will be shielded from premium increases, as their after-subsidy premiums are limited as a percentage of income under the ACA. However, those 2 million who do not receive subsidies face the brunt of the 20%+ premium increases, without subsidy assistance. This may adversely impact enrollment in 2018 and beyond. Another 13 million who are now covered under the ACA's Medicaid expansion (in the 31 states that chose to expand coverage) should not be directly affected by the President's action.

== Alexander-Murray negotiations and bill ==
Although the Trump Administration did not officially cancel the CSR payments until mid-October 2017, he had been talking about doing so long before, and so there were already ongoing negotiations between Senator Lamar Alexander (R-TN) and Senator Patty Murray (D-WA), the Chair and Ranking Member of the Senate Health, Education, Labor and Pensions Committee, to try to find a bipartisan solution to the looming problem. These negotiations had to be put on hold for much of September 2017 as Republicans made one last attempt to repeal and replace the Affordable Care Act, but when the Graham-Cassidy bill failed, these negotiations quickly restarted again. Eventually, Alexander and Murray did reach an agreement on the outline of a plan. The bill included funding of CSR payments for two years, as well as additional funding to help marketing of the enrollment period for the ACA. It made it easier for states to receive 1332 waivers, without allowing states to circumvent the ACA's essential health benefits, and also allowed for people under 30 to purchase catastrophic health insurance plans, often called 'copper' plans for their low actuarial value. The bill quickly received 24 bipartisan cosponsors, including Sen. Susan Collins (R-ME), Sen. Lisa Murkowski (R-AK), Sen. Joe Donnelly (D-IN) and Sen. Joe Manchin (D-WV). However, the bill faced a murky political future due to opposition from Republican leadership in both chambers of Congress.

=== CBO estimate on bill ===
The CBO reported on 25 October 2017 that the bill would end up cutting the deficit by $3.8 billion. While the CBO estimate of the bill did not expect it to substantially change the number of people on health insurance on net, this was mostly because the CBO baseline that they were comparing the policy changes in the legislation to already included the CSR payments that were being returned in the Alexander-Murray bill. The expanded state waiver flexibility would result in increased costs, but this would be brought down by the restoration of CSR payments as well as the addition of "copper" tier plans.

== Role of Alexander-Murray in broader political debate ==
The timing of the Alexander-Murray agreement had a major role in the difficult path to passage for the bill, as the deal was announced just as the Republican push for tax reform, which would soon become the Tax Cuts and Jobs Act of 2017, was gaining steam. The legislative calendar at the time looked fairly full, and so it quickly became clear that passage of Alexander-Murray would have to come as part of some larger agreement. Senator Susan Collins, one of the cosponsors of the bill, had serious concerns about the tax legislation, particularly regarding the repeal of the Affordable Care Act's individual mandate in the tax bill. In order to help compensate for what she saw as poor healthcare policy, she made Senate Republican Leadership promise to pass Alexander-Murray, among other pieces of healthcare legislation. However, Majority Leader Mitch McConnell was unable to keep his promise and never passed Alexander-Murray, as of May 2018. However, Collins' vote was crucial to pass the tax bill through the Senate with the thin majority Republicans had.
