= Kathleen E. Walsh =

American health care executive

Kate Walsh
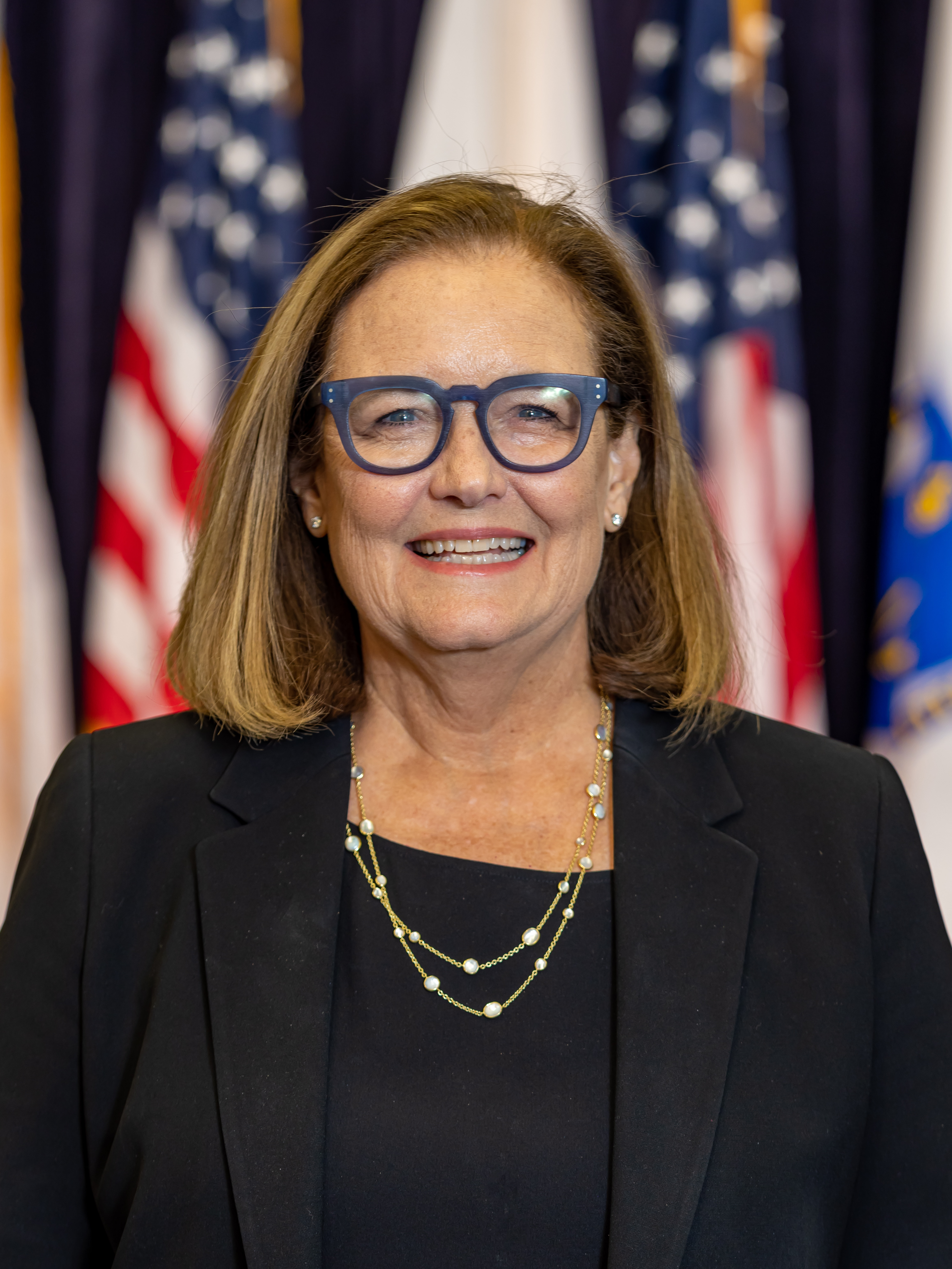
- Official portrait, 2023

Secretary of Health and Human Services of Massachusetts
- In office January 25, 2023 – July 11, 2025
- Preceded by: Marylou Sudders
- Succeeded by: Kiame Mahaniah

Personal details
- Education: Yale University (BA, MPH)

Kathleen Elizabeth Walsh is an American health care executive who was the Secretary of Health and Human Services of Massachusetts from 2023 to 2025. She was the president and chief executive officer of Boston Medical Center from 2010 to 2023. Before that, Walsh was the executive vice president and chief operating officer of Brigham and Women’s Hospital for five years.

Walsh has also worked as adjunct clinical associate professor of health law, policy & management at the Boston University School of Public Health, was the chief operating officer for Novartis Institutes for Biomedical Research, and was the senior vice president of medical services at Massachusetts General Hospital.

Walsh received her Bachelor of Arts degree (1977) and a master’s degree in public health (1979) from Yale University. Walsh is a member of Yale’s board of trustees.

She lives in Wellesley, Massachusetts.
