= Massachusetts Department of Public Health =

Government agency

Massachusetts Department of Public Health (DPH)
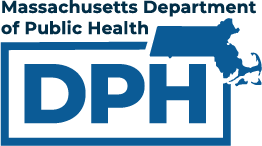

Agency overview
- Formed: June 21, 1869; 157 years ago
- Jurisdiction: Massachusetts
- Headquarters: 250 Washington St Boston, Massachusetts
- Agency executive: DRobbie Goldstein, Commissioner
- Key document: 1869 Chap. 0420. An Act To Establish A State Board Of Health
- Website: Official website

The Massachusetts Department of Public Health is a governmental agency of the Commonwealth of Massachusetts with various responsibilities related to public health within that state. It is headquartered in Boston and headed by Commissioner Robbie Goldstein, MD, PhD. DPH is one of many agencies that are part of the Massachusetts Executive Office of Health and Human Services.

DPH is an accredited health department approved by the national Public Health Accreditation Board (PHAB).
