= Springville =

Springville is the name of some places in the United States of America:

- Springville, Alabama
- Springville, California
- Springville, California, former name of Fortuna, California
- Springville, California, former town in what is now western Camarillo, California
- Springville, Georgia, former name of Powder Springs
- Springville, Indiana (disambiguation) (three different places)
- Springville, Iowa
- Springville, Massachusetts, former name of the village of Metcalf in Holliston, Massachusetts
- Springville, Michigan, an unincorporated community
- Springville, New York
- Springville, Seneca County, Ohio
- Springville, Wayne County, Ohio
- Springville, South Carolina
- Springville, Tennessee
- Springville, Utah, the largest city with the name
- Springville, Wisconsin, a town
- Springville, Vernon County, Wisconsin, an unincorporated community
- Springville Township, Michigan
- Springville Township, Pennsylvania
