= Springville Township =

Springville Township may refer to:

- Springville Township, Wexford County, Michigan
- Springville Township, Susquehanna County, Pennsylvania

See also

- Springville (disambiguation)
