= Garance Burke =

Investigative journalist for the Associated Press

- Education: Brown University (BA); UC Berkeley Graduate School of Journalism (MJ); Goldman School of Public Policy (MPP)
- Occupation: Investigative journalist
- Employer: Associated Press
- Known for: Investigative reporting on immigration, government surveillance and artificial intelligence
- Awards: Pulitzer Prize for International Reporting (2026)

Garance Burke is an investigative and data journalist for the Associated Press (AP), based in San Francisco. Her reporting has focused on artificial intelligence, government surveillance, immigration, child welfare and the use of technology by public agencies.

In 2026, Burke shared the Pulitzer Prize for International Reporting with Dake Kang, Byron Tau, Aniruddha Ghosal and Yael Grauer for the AP investigation Made in America, Watched Worldwide, which examined the development and international spread of government surveillance technology. She was previously part of an AP team named a finalist for the 2019 Pulitzer Prize for National Reporting for its coverage of the first Trump administration's separation and detention of migrant children. She earned a bachelor's degree from Brown University and master's degrees in journalism and public policy from the University of California, Berkeley.

== Education ==
Burke earned a bachelor's degree from Brown University. She subsequently attended the University of California, Berkeley, completing a Master of Journalism degree at the UC Berkeley Graduate School of Journalism in 2004 and a Master of Public Policy degree from the Goldman School of Public Policy in 2005.

Burke later taught data journalism at the UC Berkeley Graduate School of Journalism. Her courses addressed the use of statistical analysis and public data in investigative reporting.

== Career ==
Burke began her journalism career in Mexico City, working for the Mexican financial newspaper El Financiero. She later worked as a staff researcher and reporter for The Washington Post in Mexico City and also worked for The Boston Globe before joining the Associated Press in 2005.

During her career at the AP, Burke held reporting and editing assignments in locations including Anchorage, Alaska, Mexico City, Kansas City, Missouri, and Fresno, California. She worked as a supervisory correspondent and as the AP's Western data editor, assisting reporters with investigations based on public records, data analysis and computational reporting.

Burke became part of the AP's global investigations team, producing projects in text, video, photography, data and interactive formats. Her reporting has included investigations of child-protection agencies, cyber vulnerabilities in the United States power grid, immigration enforcement, military recruitment, political campaigns and algorithmic decision-making.

== Investigative reporting ==
=== Child-protection systems ===
In 2014, Burke and AP reporter Holbrook Mohr conducted an eight-month investigation of deaths involving children who had previously been brought to the attention of child-protection authorities. After assembling records from throughout the United States, they reported that at least 786 children had died from abuse or neglect during a six-year period despite their families having prior contact with child-welfare agencies.

The reporters also found inconsistencies in the information states submitted to the federal government and restrictions that prevented the public from examining the circumstances surrounding some child-abuse deaths. The investigation received the Society of Professional Journalists' 2014 Sigma Delta Chi Award for investigative reporting at a large-circulation newspaper.

=== Power-grid and political reporting ===
In 2015, Burke and Jonathan Fahey investigated the vulnerability of the United States electrical grid to foreign cyberattacks. Their reporting found that hackers had gained access to networks connected to companies operating parts of the country's electrical infrastructure and that some utilities continued to use outdated defensive systems.

During the 2016 United States presidential election, Burke interviewed more than 20 former cast and crew members of the television program The Apprentice. They alleged that the program's former host, presidential candidate Donald Trump, had repeatedly used demeaning and sexually explicit language about women while working on the show.

== Immigration reporting ==
=== Immigrant military recruits ===
In July 2018, Burke and Martha Mendoza reported that the United States Army had begun discharging immigrant recruits who had enlisted through a program offering an expedited path to citizenship for people with needed language or medical skills.

The Army subsequently suspended the discharges while reviewing the programme. A later AP report found that the Army had reinstated at least 36 recruits and suspended or begun reviewing additional discharge orders.

=== Migrant children ===
Burke was a principal reporter on the AP's coverage of the Trump administration family separation policy and the detention of migrant children. The reporting documented the establishment of shelters for babies and young children, allegations of abuse at federally funded detention facilities, difficulties tracking separated families and the possibility that deported parents could lose custody of their children through state adoption proceedings.

The AP staff was named a finalist for the 2019 Pulitzer Prize for National Reporting for coverage that the Pulitzer board said exposed the federal government's difficulties caring for and tracking thousands of children. The wider project, titled Torn Apart: Immigration in the Era of Trump, received the 2019 Robert F. Kennedy Journalism Award for domestic print reporting. Burke was among the journalists specifically credited for the work.

Burke's reporting also contributed to Kids Caught in the Crackdown, a joint AP and FRONTLINE documentary about the record number of migrant children held in federal custody and the psychological effects of confinement and family separation. The documentary won the 2020 News and Documentary Emmy Award for Outstanding Continuing Coverage of a News Story in a Newsmagazine.

== Artificial intelligence and surveillance ==
=== Stanford fellowship and Tracked ===
Burke was selected for the 2019–2020 class of the John S. Knight Journalism Fellowships at Stanford University. As an inaugural fellow jointly supported by the Stanford Institute for Human-Centered Artificial Intelligence, she studied how algorithms affect government decision-making and how journalists could investigate automated systems.

After returning to the AP, Burke helped develop Tracked, an investigative series examining the effects of algorithmic and surveillance technologies on individuals and communities. The project included investigations of gunshot-detection systems, police access to mobile-phone location records, predictive tools used by child-welfare departments and algorithms used to match children with prospective adoptive parents.

Burke and Sally Ho investigated an algorithm used by child-protection authorities in Allegheny County, Pennsylvania, to assign risk scores to families. Their reporting examined the system's use of information involving poverty, disability, public benefits, criminal records and mental-health services, and raised concerns that historical inequalities contained in government data could influence which families were investigated.

After the investigation, Oregon stopped using a similar algorithm in child-abuse cases because of concerns about racial equity. The United States Department of Justice also examined civil-rights complaints concerning the Allegheny County system and its possible effects on parents with disabilities.

Another investigation by Burke and Jason Dearen examined Fog Reveal, a location-tracking tool used by police departments. The reporters found that law-enforcement agencies had used the service to search location information collected from hundreds of millions of mobile devices, often without first obtaining a search warrant.

Burke and Ho received a 2023 Clarion Award in the newspaper investigative-series category for Tracked.

=== Artificial-intelligence journalism standards ===
In 2023, Burke led the development of the AP Stylebook's guidance for journalists reporting on artificial intelligence. The guidance advised reporters to avoid attributing human qualities to automated systems, independently examine claims made by technology companies and investigate the present-day effects of AI rather than concentrating solely on hypothetical future developments.

The chapter also included terminology and suggested questions for examining how AI systems are designed, trained and evaluated. Burke said that journalists should focus reporting on the people who create examining how AI systems are designed, trained and evaluated. Burke and deploy AI systems and on the individuals affected by their decisions.

== Made in America, Watched Worldwide ==
Burke was among the principal reporters on Made in America, Watched Worldwide, an AP investigation conducted over approximately three years. The project examined how technology developed by companies in Silicon Valley contributed to the creation of China's mass-surveillance infrastructure and how related technologies subsequently spread to other countries.

The reporting was based on internal corporate documents, public-records requests, lobbying disclosures, congressional testimony and interviews with current and former government and technology-industry officials. The series reported on surveillance technology used in China, Nepal, Gaza and Lebanon, as well as the United States Border Patrol's use of automated licence-plate tracking to identify vehicles with travel patterns considered suspicious.

The project received the Overseas Press Club of America's Malcolm Forbes and Morton Frank Award for international business reporting in 2026. Burke, Kang, Tau, Ghosal and Grauer subsequently received the 2026 Pulitzer Prize for International Reporting. The Pulitzer citation recognized the series for tracing surveillance technologies from Silicon Valley to China, their international expansion and their later use by United States border authorities.

== Awards and recognition ==
In 2015, Burke and Holbrook Mohr received the Society of Professional Journalists' Sigma Delta Chi Award for investigative reporting for their investigation of children who died after coming to the attention of child-protection agencies.

In 2018, the Goldman School of Public Policy gave Burke its Award for Exceptional Leadership in Policy and Journalism.

In 2019, Burke and other members of the Associated Press staff were finalists for the Pulitzer Prize for National Reporting for their coverage of migrant family separation. The reporting team also received the Robert F. Kennedy Journalism Award for domestic print reporting.

In 2020, Kids Caught in the Crackdown, the AP and FRONTLINE documentary developed from the migrant-child investigation, received a News and Documentary Emmy Award for continuing news coverage.

In 2023, Burke and Sally Ho received a Clarion Award for the AP investigative series Tracked.

In 2026, Burke and her colleagues received the Overseas Press Club's Malcolm Forbes and Morton Frank Award for Made in America, Watched Worldwide. Burke then shared the Pulitzer Prize for International Reporting with Dake Kang, Byron Tau, Aniruddha Ghosal and Yael Grauer for the same investigation.
