= Dake Kang =

American investigative journalist

- Education: University of Chicago (AB)
- Occupation: Investigative journalist
- Employer: Associated Press
- Notable work: China Clamps Down; China Cracks Down; Made in America, Watched Worldwide
- Awards: Pulitzer Prize for International Reporting (2026)

Dake Kang is an American investigative journalist for the Associated Press (AP), based in Beijing. He reports on Chinese politics, technology, society and human rights, and has conducted reporting across Central, South and East Asia.

Kang shared the 2026 Pulitzer Prize for International Reporting with Garance Burke, Byron Tau, Aniruddha Ghosal and Yael Grauer for an investigation into the development and international spread of government surveillance technology. He had previously been named a finalist for the 2021 Pulitzer Prize for Investigative Reporting for reporting on the Chinese government's initial response to the COVID-19 pandemic and its treatment of Uyghurs.

== Early life and education ==
Kang is from New Jersey and has described himself as Korean American. He spent five years of his childhood in Shanghai, an experience that contributed to his later interest in returning to China as a journalist.

Kang attended the University of Chicago, where he studied history and mathematics. He graduated with a Bachelor of Arts degree in 2016. His undergraduate thesis examined the construction of the first line of the Beijing Subway and the influence of Soviet engineering and Cold War civil-defence planning on the project.

While at university, Kang participated in the university's journalism career programme and worked as a newsroom intern at CNN in Atlanta. His work during the internship included researching stories, writing scripts, editing footage and assisting with field interviews.

== Career ==
Kang joined the Associated Press as an intern in Philadelphia in 2016. Before taking up a permanent role in China, he reported for the organization from New York, Thailand and Ohio, including assignments in Cleveland. His reporting has also taken him to India and Iowa.

In 2016, Kang received the Overseas Press Club Foundation's Fritz Beebe Fellowship, which placed him in the AP's Beijing bureau. He became based in Beijing in 2018. By 2026, he was serving as the AP's chief investigative correspondent for Greater China, coordinating enterprise and long-term reporting projects with journalists across the region.

In addition to investigative projects, Kang has reported on human trafficking, forced labour, mass detention, China's zero-COVID policy, the 2019–2020 Hong Kong protests, technology and political developments in China. His work has combined written reporting, photography and video, and the Pulitzer Prize organization has described him as a multiformat journalist.

== Reporting on Xinjiang ==
Kang was one of the lead reporters, alongside Yanan Wang, on the Associated Press series China Clamps Down. The investigation examined the Chinese government's restrictions on religious practice and its policies toward ethnic and religious minorities, particularly Uyghurs in Xinjiang.

The reporting documented detention centres, political indoctrination, restrictions on religious activity and other elements of the government's campaign in Xinjiang. Kang travelled extensively in the region and contributed reporting on internment, forced labour and the separation of families.

The series received the 2019 Osborn Elliott Prize for Excellence in Journalism on Asia. It also received the Society of Professional Journalists' Sigma Delta Chi Award for foreign correspondence. Other recognition included a Society for Advancing Business Editing and Writing Best in Business Award, a Wilbur Award for reporting on religion and a citation from the Overseas Press Club of America.

Kang also reported on the trafficking of Pakistani Christian women to China for forced or fraudulent marriages and on Uyghur women from Pakistan who had disappeared into detention facilities in Xinjiang.

== COVID-19 and China Cracks Down ==
During the early stages of the COVID-19 pandemic, Kang led or contributed to investigations of the Chinese government's handling of the outbreak. The reporting examined delays in warning the public, restrictions on the release of scientific information, testing problems and official efforts to control research into the origins of the virus.

The wider AP package, titled China Cracks Down, combined the pandemic reporting with investigations into human rights abuses in Xinjiang. The nominated stories included reports on forced medication during lockdowns, coercive birth-control policies and the alleged use of Uyghur labour in supply chains connected to international technology companies.

Kang and the AP staff received the Overseas Press Club's 2020 Roy Rowan Award for best investigative reporting on an international story for the project. The work was also named a finalist for the 2021 Pulitzer Prize for Investigative Reporting. The Pulitzer citation described it as an investigation into Chinese state secrecy, the government's early pandemic response and abuses against Uyghurs.

== Surveillance investigation ==
Kang was a principal reporter on the Associated Press investigation Made in America, Watched Worldwide. Conducted over almost three years and across three continents, the project examined the role of American technology companies and the United States government in the development and sale of surveillance systems used in China and elsewhere.

The investigation used internal documents, interviews and visual reporting to trace surveillance technologies created or supplied by companies in Silicon Valley. The project examined their use in China's policing and mass-surveillance systems, their spread to countries including Nepal, and the use of licence-plate tracking by the United States Border Patrol.

The published package included reports on American companies supplying technologies used in China's surveillance infrastructure, the monitoring of Chinese political dissidents abroad, surveillance of Tibetan refugees in Nepal and the tracking of drivers in the United States. Photographers and visual journalists working on the project used infrared photography and other techniques to illustrate surveillance signals that are ordinarily invisible.

In 2026, Kang, Garance Burke, Byron Tau, Aniruddha Ghosal and independent journalist Yael Grauer received the Pulitzer Prize for International Reporting for the investigation. The project also received the Overseas Press Club's Malcolm Forbes and Morton Frank Award for international business reporting.

== Awards and recognition ==
In 2019, Kang and the Associated Press team behind China Clamps Down received the Osborn Elliott Prize for Excellence in Journalism on Asia. The project also won the Sigma Delta Chi Award for foreign correspondence, a Best in Business Award for international reporting and a Wilbur Award for reporting on religion.

In 2020, Kang and the AP staff received the Overseas Press Club's Roy Rowan Award for the investigative series China Cracks Down.

In 2021, Kang and the AP staff were finalists for the Pulitzer Prize for Investigative Reporting for their coverage of China's initial COVID-19 response and human rights abuses against Uyghurs.

In 2026, Kang shared the Pulitzer Prize for International Reporting with Garance Burke, Byron Tau, Aniruddha Ghosal and Yael Grauer for Made in America, Watched Worldwide. The same project received the Overseas Press Club's Malcolm Forbes and Morton Frank Award for international business reporting.
