= WHHB =

Radio station at Holliston High School in Holliston, Massachusetts

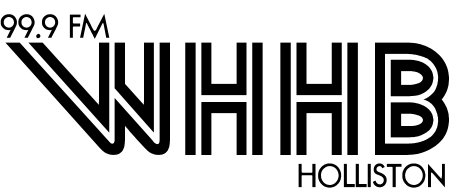
- Holliston, Massachusetts; United States
- Broadcast area: MetroWest
- Frequency: 99.9 MHz

Programming
- Format: High school radio, variety

Ownership
- Owner: Holliston High School

History
- First air date: April 17, 1979 (at 91.5)
- Former frequencies: 91.5 MHz (1979–1999)
- Call sign meaning: "Holliston High School Broadcasting"

Technical information
- Licensing authority: FCC
- Facility ID: 27476
- Class: D
- ERP: 17 watts
- HAAT: 62 meters (203 ft)
- Transmitter coordinates: 42°12′42.00″N 71°26′36.00″W

Links
- Public license information: Public file; LMS

WHHB (99.9 FM) is a high school radio station broadcasting a variety format. Licensed to Holliston, Massachusetts, the station serves the MetroWest area of Greater Boston. The station is owned by Holliston High School. Music from various genres is played during the shows, such as heavy metal, rock, hip-hop, and oldies. Some shows also include pithy, hard-hitting running commentary on local, national, and international topics.

Founded in 1971 by William P Curboy, Donald LeFebvre, John McColgan, John Pacitto, and John Shannahan. WHHB is one of a dying breed of completely student-operated, educational radio stations in the US. It currently operates only during weekdays with various two-hour time slots run by different students. There are also half-hour morning slots usually contained by one to two shows, and during its Spring '06 season, approximately 106 students applied for shows, causing weekend slots to appear for that season. Since then such measures have been unnecessary as there have not been so many students. Although there has been speculation for adding automated programming after hours, the Barnstable station WQRC or the 99.9 translator of WJDA in Quincy can be heard usually after the station is off air. WHHB's range is not a perfect circle since the transmitting antenna shares the same tower as other radio equipment. It has been reached by listeners as far as downtown Framingham, Southboro and even Wellesley.
