= Carolyn Dykema =

American politician

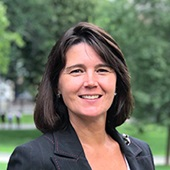

Member of the Massachusetts House of Representatives from the 8th Middlesex district
- In office January 7, 2009 – February 11, 2022
- Preceded by: Paul Loscocco
- Succeeded by: James Arena-DeRosa

Personal details
- Born: December 26, 1967 (age 58) Wellesley, Massachusetts
- Party: Democratic
- Spouse: Bill Dykema
- Education: Wellesley College, Indiana University
- Occupation: State Representative
- Website: http://www.carolyndykema.com/, http://www.dykemaforrep.com/

Carolyn (Coyne) Dykema (born December 26, 1967, Charlottesville, Virginia) was the Massachusetts state representative from the Massachusetts House of Representatives' 8th Middlesex district from 2009 until her resignation to take a private sector job in 2022.

For 2012 and subsequent elections, the Eighth Middlesex is made up of Holliston, Hopkinton, Southborough, and precinct 2 of Westborough. Holliston and Hopkinton are in Middlesex County while Southborough and Westborough are in Worcester County. When Dykema was first elected, the Eighth Middlesex comprised the towns of Holliston and Hopkinton and precincts in Medway (Norfolk County), Southborough and Westborough.

== Public service ==
Dykema was elected to the Holliston Planning Board in 2003. In 2007, she was elected chair. She stepped down in April 2008 to run for state representative. As a member of the Planning Board, she was also on numerous related local and regional boards, notably the Metropolitan Area Planning Council, the MetroWest Growth Management Committee and the SuAsCo Community Watershed Council.

Governor Deval Patrick appointed Dykema to the Massachusetts Energy Facilities Siting Board in 2007.

In 2006, the American Legion awarded Dykema, one of the "Katrina Ladies", the Citation for Meritorious Service for spearheading hurricane relief through Operation Help & Hope.

The Massachusetts Commission on the Status of Women named her the 2007 Holliston Unsung Heroine of the Year.

Dykema was elected to the Commonwealth of Massachusetts General Court in 2008 and has been re-elected to office in each biennial election since. Her most recent opponent was Republican Patricia Vanaria in 2014.

=== Political platform ===
In 2008, Dykema won against Ed Mills (D-Hopkinton) in the Democratic primary and against Dan Haley (R-Holliston) in the general election on a platform of:

- well-planned economic development
- high-quality public education
- environmental protection

On social issues, she supported:

- equal gay marriage
- a woman's right to choose

In 2010, Dykema faced opposition from Jonathan Loya, also from Holliston. Loya ran as an independent but identified his party affiliation on the general election ballot as the Liberty Party, a small Libertarian group. Dykema won re-election easily with 71% of the vote. Her 2010 platform emphasized:

- job growth, especially high-value green jobs
- infrastructure, especially water infrastructure
- continuous improvement in state government and state services
- pension reform
- health care cost containment

Voters re-elected Dykema in 2012, choosing her in a landslide over Marty Lamb (R-Holliston), who had run unsuccessfully for Congress in 2010 against Jim McGovern. Dykema took 61% of the vote in a hotly contested election.

=== Committee assignments ===
For the previous legislative session, Dykema sat on these legislative committees:

- Committee on Telecommunications, Utilities, and Energy (Vice Chair)
- Committee on Ways and Means
- Committee on Mental Health, Substance Use, and Recovery
- Committee on Personnel and Administration

Notable past assignments include:

- Joint Committee on Transportation (Vice Chair)
- Joint Committee on Children, Families and Persons with Disabilities
- Joint Committee on Health Care Finance
- Joint Committee on Telecommunications, Utilities, and Energy
- Joint Committee on Ways and Means
- House Committee on Ways and Means
- Joint Committee on Veterans and Federal Affairs
- Joint Committee on Environment, Natural Resources, and Agriculture
- Joint Committee on Housing
- Water Infrastructure Finance Commission
- Joint Committee on Public Health

=== Awards as a legislator ===
For her service as a legislator, Dykema has been honored by the following awards:

- Legislator of the Year Award from the Massachusetts Veterans Service Officers Association, February 15, 2011
- 2012 Environmental Leadership Award from the Massachusetts Nursery and Landscape Association, Inc., February 2, 2012
- Agriculture Day Award from the Massachusetts Farm Bureau Federation, April 3, 2012
- 2012 Legislator of the Year Award from the Massachusetts Water Works Association, October 11, 2012
- The Holliston American Legion Post's "A Friend Indeed" Award, November 10, 2012
- 2014 Legislator of the Year Award from the MWRA Advisory Board, March 19, 2015
- Elaine Beals Conservation Award from the Southborough Open Land Foundation, May 27, 2015
- Challenge Coin from the Armed Forces Committee of Worcester County, March 19, 2016
- 2016 Legislator of the Year Award from the Massachusetts Bee Keeper Association, November 22, 2016

== Personal life ==
Dykema grew up in Wellesley. She and her husband Bill live in Holliston. Their three children attended and graduated from the Holliston Public Schools.

=== Education ===
Dykema graduated from Wellesley High School in 1985. She attended Wellesley College, where she majored in French, graduating in 1989. She graduated with an MBA from the Kelley School of Business at the Indiana University in 1994.

=== Business career ===
Dykema worked at Fidelity Investments between 1989 and 1998, with a break for business school at Indiana University. At the time of her departure, she was senior communications manager in Marlborough and Boston.

During 1998 and 1999, Dykema was a marketing consultant for Pamet River Partners in Boston.

Between 2004 and her election to the legislature, Dykema was the marketing and business development manager at Norfolk Ram, an environmental consulting firm in Milford.

== See also ==
- 2019–2020 Massachusetts legislature
- 2021–2022 Massachusetts legislature
