= Hydrant No. 3 House =

- U.S. National Register of Historic Places
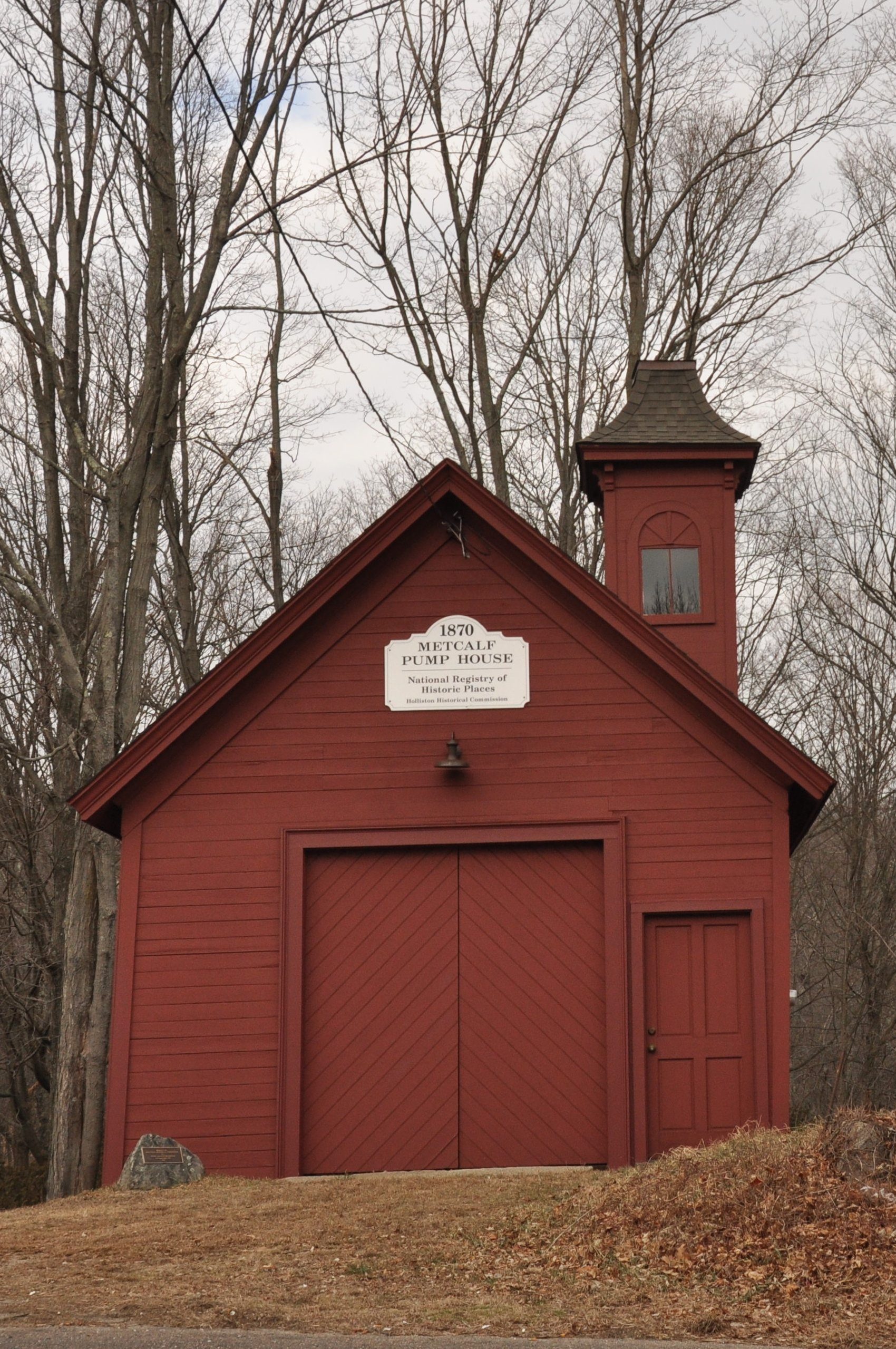

- Location within Massachusetts Location within the United States
- Location: Holliston, Massachusetts
- Coordinates: 42°11′0″N 71°26′41″W
- Architect: Sanger, Samuel A.
- Architectural style: Italianate
- NRHP reference No.: 00000113
- Added to NRHP: March 6, 2000

Hydrant No. 3 House is a historic fire station on Washington Street in the former village of Metcalf in Holliston, Massachusetts. It is referred to locally as the Metcalf Pump House. The single-story wood-frame building was built c. 1871, and was designed to house a single period fire engine. The building's principal ornamentation is its hose tower, which is topped by an Italianate-style cupola. It is the town's oldest surviving fire house, and one of only a few 19th-century municipal buildings in the town. The building remained in service until 1899. The original No. 3 engine is in storage, and was restored in 1950. The building is now maintained by volunteers.

The building was added to the National Register of Historic Places in 2000.

== See also ==
- Metcalf, Massachusetts
- National Register of Historic Places listings in Middlesex County, Massachusetts
