= Amy Townsend-Small =

American university teacher (born 1976)

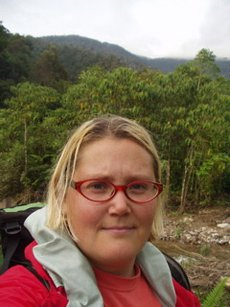
- Townsend-Small in 2005
- Born: 1976; Seattle, Washington, US
- Education: Skidmore College, University of Texas at Austin
- Awards: OEC's Science and Community Award
- Website: University of Cincinnati Faculty Website

Amy Townsend-Small is a professor in the School of Environment and Sustainability at the University of Cincinnati.

== Early life and education ==
Townsend-Small was born in Seattle, Washington. She grew up in Holliston, Massachusetts, and graduated from Holliston High School. While attending Skidmore College in 1997, Townsend-Small spent a semester at the Marine Biological Laboratory in Woods Hole, Massachusetts as part of the Semester in Environmental Science program. During this semester she produced a research project investigating the use of nitrogen stable isotopes as tracers of wastewater inputs to groundwater, and has continued to work with isotopes and marine environments since.

In 1998, Townsend-Small graduated magna cum laude from Skidmore College, receiving a bachelor's degree in both English literature and environmental biology. She received a PhD in marine science from the University of Texas at Austin in 2006, where she had done dissertation research investigating carbon cycling and its relationship with climate in the Amazon River headwaters of Peru.

== Career and research ==
Townsend-Small's dissertation research focused on examining the particulate organic matter (POM) carried downstream by rivers from the Andes Mountains in Peru to the Amazon River, paying special attention to the elemental and isotopic compositions of carbon and nitrogen in the POM. After receiving her PhD, Townsend-Small worked at the University of Texas at Austin as a postdoctoral researcher studying the connection between changing climate and the export of carbon, nitrogen, and dissolved nutrients in rivers of the Alaskan Arctic. In 2007, Townsend-Small began working as a Postdoctoral Scholar and Project Scientist in the Department of Earth System Science at the University of California Irvine, where she conducted research regarding urban greenhouse gas and water budgets in Los Angeles, California. Since 2010, Townsend-Small has been at the University of Cincinnati, where she is now an associate professor in the Department of Geology and Geography as well as the director of the Environmental Studies Program. Her current research at UCI investigates anthropogenic sources of methane and climate change feedbacks to the global carbon cycle.

=== Awards and honors ===
In 2010, Townsend-Small led a research project known as UC GRO (Groundwater Research of Ohio), run by the University of Cincinnati. The study involved testing samples of groundwater from eastern Ohio for dissolved methane concentrations in order to determine the relationship between contaminated groundwater and the process of hydraulic fracturing (fracking) for natural gas. In praise of the project's innovative and unique groundwater analysis techniques, the Ohio Environmental Council (OEC) awarded Townsend-Small the Science and Community Award in 2014.
