= Paul Loscocco =

American politician

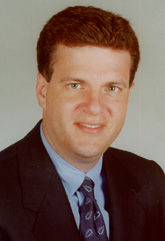

Member of the Massachusetts House of Representatives from the 8th Middlesex district
- In office January 3, 2001 – January 7, 2009
- Preceded by: Barbara Gardner
- Succeeded by: Carolyn Dykema

Personal details
- Born: Paul Joseph Perry Loscocco; March 7, 1962 (age 64) Framingham, Massachusetts, U.S.
- Party: Republican (before 2010, 2010-Present); Independent (2010)
- Spouse: Ann
- Children: 3
- Education: Boston College (BA, JD)

Paul Joseph Perry Loscocco (born March 7, 1962) is an American lawyer and politician. He is a former Massachusetts Republican state representative and was a candidate for lieutenant governor in the 2010 Massachusetts gubernatorial election.

In January 2010, Loscocco announced his intention to unenroll from the Republican Party in order to run for lieutenant governor as an independent in the 2010 Massachusetts gubernatorial election. State Treasurer and former Democrat Tim Cahill had selected Loscocco to be his running mate. After months of campaigning, on October 1, 2010, Loscocco withdrew from the race and endorsed Republican candidate Charlie Baker.

== Early life and career ==
He is the son of Anthony P. Loscocco and R. Marie (nee Perry) Loscocco. He graduated from Holliston High School in 1980, and then attended Boston College, where he earned his B.A. in 1984. He then enrolled in Boston College Law School where he earned his J.D. in 1987 and has practiced law as an attorney for the Boston-based law firm of Riemer & Braunstein since graduating.

== Political career ==
He ran for the Massachusetts House of Representatives in 2000 and won his first bid for elected office. Loscocco served the 8th Middlesex District from 2001 until 2009. He did not run for re-election in the 2008 elections.

== 2010 campaign for lieutenant governor ==
He was running for lieutenant governor as an independent with State Treasurer Tim Cahill, a former Democrat. On October 1, 2010, Loscocco left the Cahill campaign and endorsed Republican Charles Baker, citing Cahill's falling poll numbers.

== Personal life ==
Loscocco and his wife Ann are the parents of three children. They live in Chatham, New Hampshire.
