= Isaac Bullard House =

Historic house in Massachusetts, United States

- U.S. National Register of Historic Places
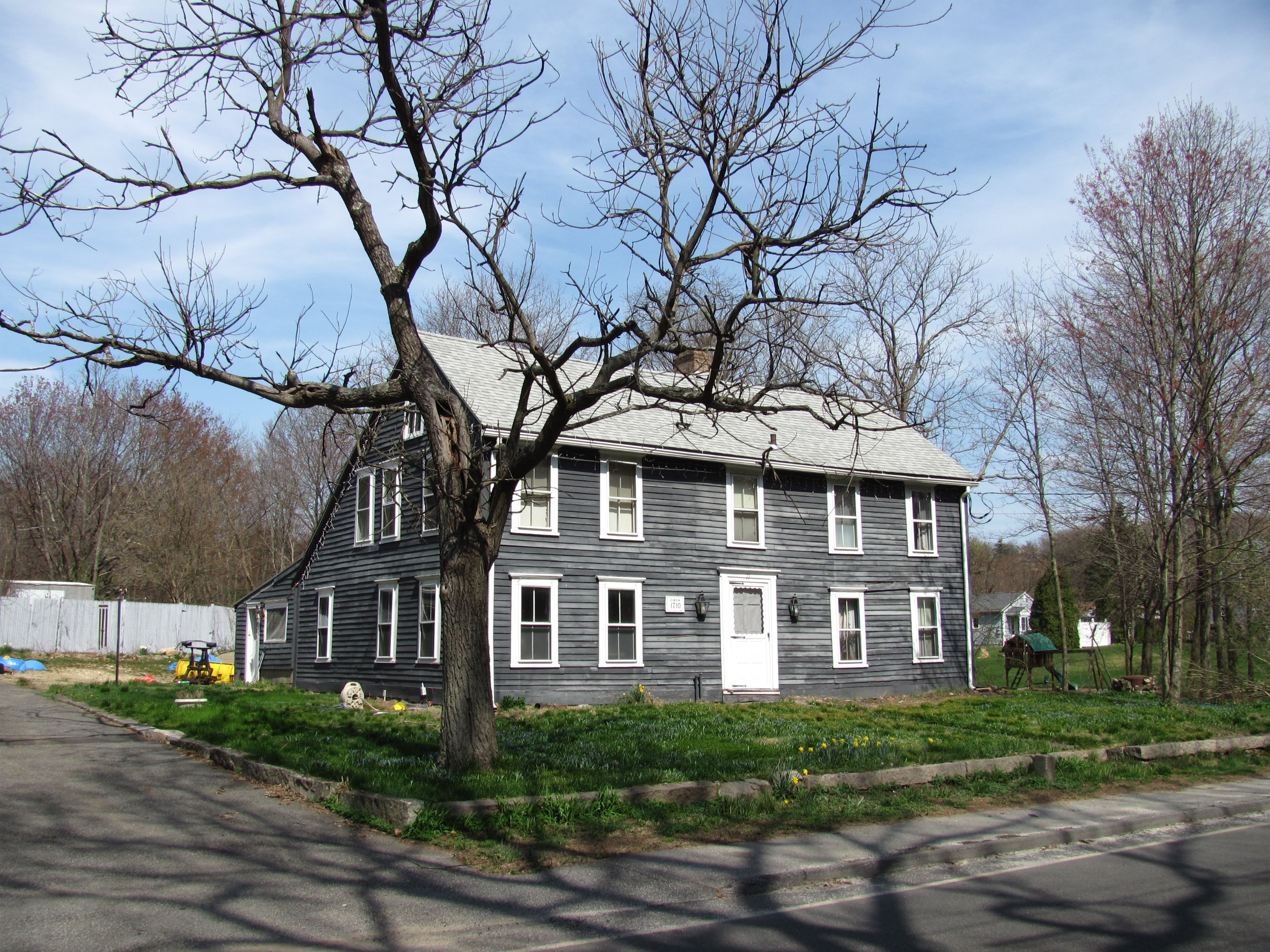
- Isaac Bullard House

- Location within Massachusetts Location within the United States
- Location: 77 Ashland Street, Holliston, Massachusetts
- Coordinates: 42°13′42″N 71°26′8″W
- Built: 1710
- Architectural style: Colonial, Saltbox
- MPS: First Period Buildings of Eastern Massachusetts TR
- NRHP reference No.: 90000171
- Added to NRHP: March 9, 1990

The Isaac Bullard House is a historic late First Period house located in Holliston, Massachusetts.

== Description and history ==
The oldest portion of this 2 1/2-story timber-frame house, its eastern three bays, was built c. 1710. The western two bays were added later in the 18th century, as was the rear leanto, giving the building its saltbox appearance. The original massive central chimney was replaced in the 1930s by a smaller one; the front stairs were also replaced at this time. A 20th century screened porch has been added across the rear of the house.

The house was listed on the National Register of Historic Places on March 9, 1990.

== See also ==
- National Register of Historic Places listings in Middlesex County, Massachusetts
