= Metcalf, Holliston, Massachusetts =

Metcalf
- Village
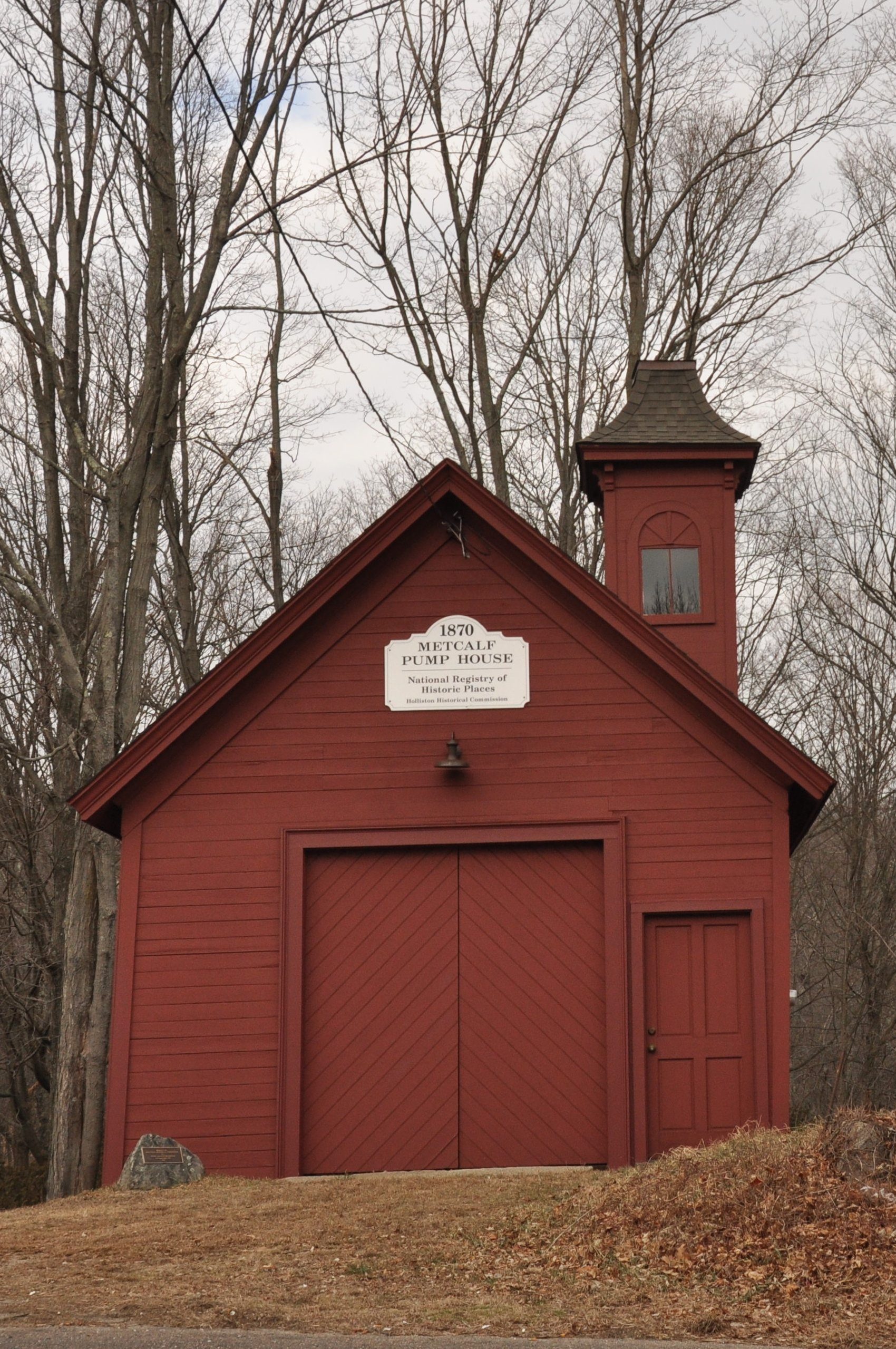
- The Metcalf Pump House, constructed c.1870, decommissioned 1899
- Etymology: Named for landowner Stephen Metcalf Jr., who lived at the intersection of Summer & Washington St. throughout the mid-19th century
- Nickname: Springville (de facto name circa 1850)
- Interactive map of Metcalf
- Coordinates: 42°11′0″N 71°26′43″W
- Country: United States
- State: Massachusetts
- County: Middlesex
- Elevation: 243 ft (74 m)
- Time zone: UTC-5 (Eastern (EST))
  - Summer (DST): UTC-4 (EDT)
- ZIP code: 01746
- Area code: 508
- GNIS feature ID: 611709

Metcalf (rarely, Metcalfs) is an unincorporated village and former railway stop located in the town of Holliston in Middlesex County, Massachusetts, United States.

The village does not have its own post office today, but did when it was a stop for the Boston and Albany Railroad on the Milford Branch until c. 1958. The station was mostly used as a post office and functioned as a flag stop.

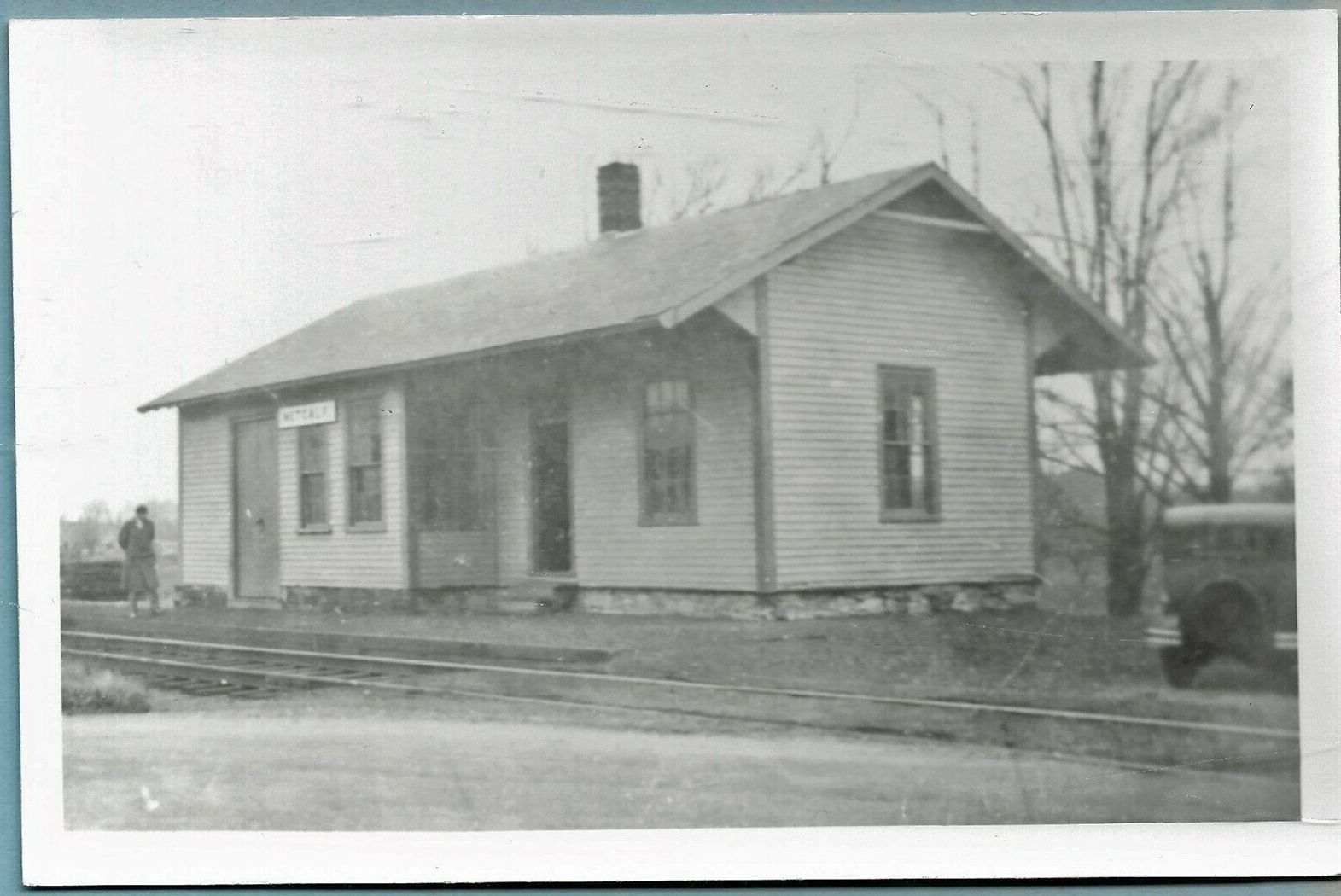
Metcalf Station seen in a 1928 postcard

The village was said to have more cows than people, as the main industry was dairy farming. Before the consolidation of Holliston’s schools, the village had a one-room schoolhouse.

Today it is characterized by its historic pump house and several historic structures abutting the crossroads of Washington St. and Summer St. Metcalf remains a residential community today with some light industry, and the local Fatima Shrine.

== Geography ==
Metcalf does not have any borders defined by the United States Census Bureau, and throughout its history has lacked any defining boundaries aside from its central point at the intersection of Washington Street and Summer Street in Holliston, which is corroborated by the U.S. Geological Survey. From its appearance on several atlases the village appears to lie well within Underwood Street to the north and east, the Cedar Swamp at its west, and the Medway-Holliston border to its south.

- Holliston on the north, east, and west
- Medway on the south

== See also ==
- Braggville, Massachusetts
- Holliston, Massachusetts
- East Holliston Historic District
- Thomas Hollis Historic District
