= Barbara Gardner =

American politician

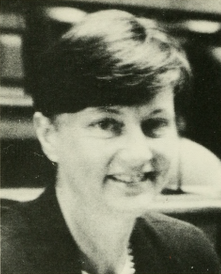

Member of the Massachusetts House of Representatives from the 8th Middlesex district
- In office 1986–2001

Barbara Gardner (born January 19, 1941) is an American Democratic politician from Holliston, Massachusetts. She represented the 8th Middlesex district in the Massachusetts House of Representatives from 1986 to 2001.

Gardner was born on January 19, 1941, in Rochester, New York and received her B.A. from Framingham State College.

== See also ==
- 1985-1986 Massachusetts legislature
- 1987-1988 Massachusetts legislature
- 1989-1990 Massachusetts legislature
- 1991-1992 Massachusetts legislature
- 1993-1994 Massachusetts legislature
- 1995-1996 Massachusetts legislature
- 1997-1998 Massachusetts legislature
- 1999-2000 Massachusetts legislature
