= Thomas Hollis Historic District =

Historic district in Massachusetts, United States

- U.S. National Register of Historic Places
- U.S. Historic district
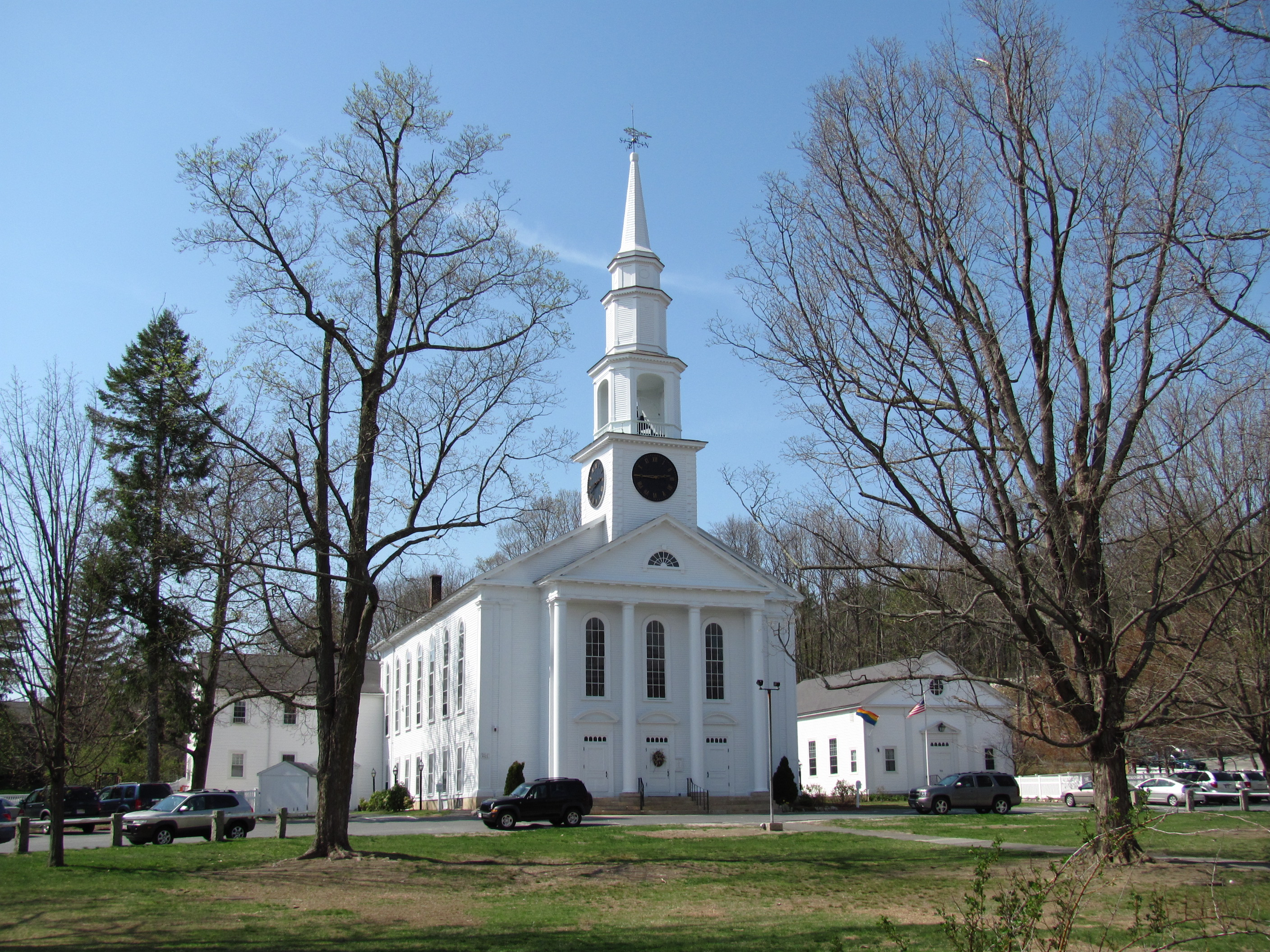
- First Congregational Church

- Location within Massachusetts Location within the United States
- Location: Holliston, Massachusetts
- Coordinates: 42°11′42″N 71°26′0″W
- Area: 143 acres (58 ha)
- Architect: Payson, Edwin
- Architectural style: Mid 19th Century Revival, Late 19th And 20th Century Revivals, Late Victorian
- NRHP reference No.: 89001786
- Added to NRHP: October 30, 1989

The Thomas Hollis Historic District encompasses the historic civic and commercial heart of Holliston, Massachusetts. It extends along Washington Street (Massachusetts Routes 16 and 126 for about one mile, between Winter Street and Highland Street. Incorporated in 1724, this area now includes a well-preserved collection of predominantly 19th century architecture. The district was listed on the National Register of Historic Places in 1989.

== Description and history ==
The town of Holliston was first settled by European settlers in the 1680s, when it was part of Sherborn. The town was incorporated in 1724, named for Thomas Hollis, a wealthy English merchant. At that time, the town's first meetinghouse was built, and its first cemetery (the Central Cemetery, located next to the town offices and opposite Elm Street) was laid out. Washington Street itself was laid out in 1731, joining the town to Mendon. Typical finer houses of this early period would have resembled the Isaac Foster House, 617 Washington Street, built in 1727.

The town's major period of growth during the 19th century took place before the American Civil War, resulting in the construction of a number of fine Federal and Greek Revival houses in its center. A number of its major civic buildings were also built during this time, including the Federal style First Congregation Church (1822) and Italianate style Town Hall (1855). Other churches were built during this time, but only the 1833 Methodist Church survives, extensively altered, as a Masonic hall. After the war, development remained slow until the arrival of the railroad c. 1900, when a number of brick commercial buildings went up. Also built during this time was the Holliston Public Library (c. 1903), which received funding support from Andrew Carnegie. Although there are some more modern 20th century intrusions consequent to the town's growth as a suburb, much of the center is recognizably from the turn of the 20th century or earlier.

== See also ==
- National Register of Historic Places listings in Middlesex County, Massachusetts
