= Braggville, Massachusetts =

- Village
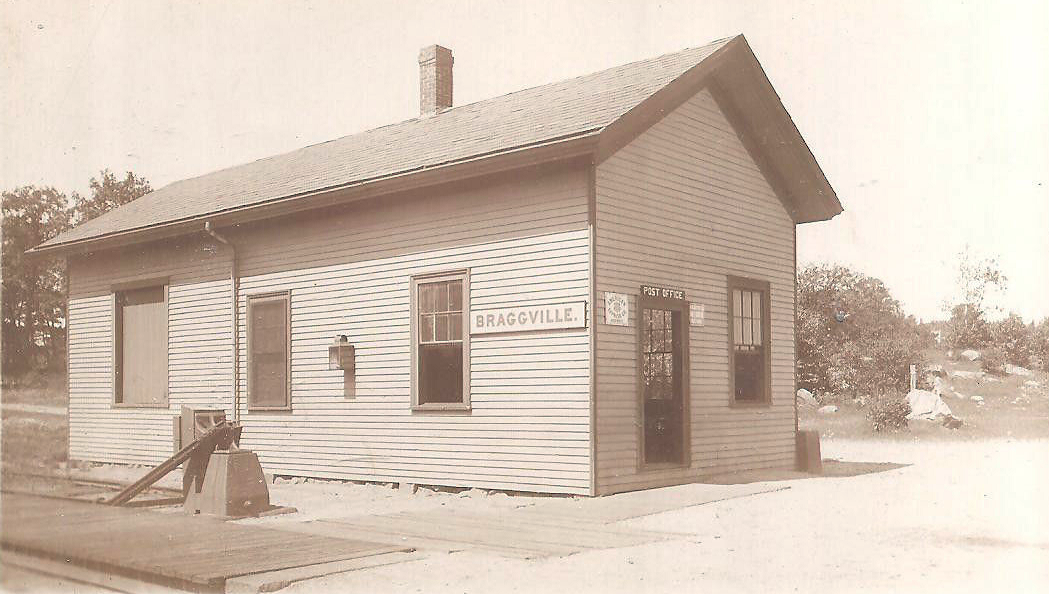
- Braggville Depot and Post Office, c. 1919
- Interactive map of Braggville, Massachusetts
- Coordinates: 42°10′0″N 71°28′48″W
- Country: United States
- State: Massachusetts
- County: Middlesex, Worcester, Norfolk
- Elevation: 299 ft (91 m)
- Time zone: UTC-5 (Eastern (EST))
  - Summer (DST): UTC-4 (EDT)
- ZIP code: 01746, 01757, 02053
- Area code: 508
- GNIS feature ID: 611657

Braggville is a former postal village located in Massachusetts, now within the towns of Holliston in Middlesex County, Medway in Norfolk County and Milford in Worcester County. Though people had settled the land long before the incorporation of the town of Holliston, Braggville's unofficial history began on March 8, 1785, when Alexander Bragg purchased farmland there. The village itself however, would be named for his nephew, Colonel Arial Bragg, Holliston's first shoe and boot maker as well as the agrarian community's first wholesale manufacturer. Braggville was also the site of several quarries of Milford pink granite, which supplied buildings and railroad projects in the United States in the late 19th century. After a century of economic prowess, the village fell into decline following the First World War.

== Decline and obscurity ==
With the emergence of the Post–World War I recession much of the town's business came to a standstill. By March 1919, the Boston and Albany Railroad had ceased providing passenger service to the Braggville station, as well as all freight service. Although its schoolhouse would remain standing for several more decades, the end of Braggville as a would-be town came in June 1919, when the U.S. Mail shuttered its post office.

== Geography ==
A map of Braggville, as it appeared at the village's industrial and cultural peak between the years of 1850 and 1880.

Braggville does not have official borders defined by the United States Census Bureau, and throughout its history has held nebulous boundaries. The U.S. Geological Survey places it as a populated place solely in the town of Holliston, however historical accounts describe it as partially extending into Milford and Medway

It is located 25.2 mi (40.6 km) west of Boston and is adjacent to Interstate 495. Massachusetts Route 16 passes through the village, bisecting it almost evenly.

=== Adjacent towns ===
Braggville is located in eastern Massachusetts, and bordered by:

- Holliston on the north
- Medway on the south and east
- Milford on the west

== See also ==
- Kampersal Field
- Metcalf, Holliston, Massachusetts
- Holliston, Massachusetts
- Medway, Massachusetts
- Milford, Massachusetts
