= Ron LaPointe =

American football player (born 1957)

No. 85
- Position: Tight end

Personal information
- Born: February 28, 1957 (age 69); Holliston, Massachusetts, U.S.
- Listed height: 6 ft 3 in (1.91 m)
- Listed weight: 235 lb (107 kg)

Career information
- High school: Holliston
- College: Penn State
- NFL draft: 1980: undrafted

Career history
- Baltimore Colts (1980); Oakland Raiders (1981)
- Stats at Pro Football Reference

Ronald Arthur LaPointe (born February 28, 1957) is an American former professional football player. He played tight end in the National Football League (NFL) for two seasons; one each with the Baltimore Colts and the Oakland Raiders. He played college football for the Penn State Nittany Lions.

== Early life ==
LaPointe was a multi-sport athlete at Holliston High School, in Holliston, Massachusetts, where he played football, basketball, and baseball. In an era with few restrictions on player contact from college recruiters, LaPointe was reportedly pursued by more than 50 colleges, including such football powerhouses as Tennessee, Ohio State, Penn State, Boston College, Oklahoma State, and Syracuse.

== College career ==
At Penn State University, LaPointe was redshirted his freshman year (1975) and played sparingly behind future All-Pro, Mickey Shuler the next two seasons (1976, 1977). He became the Nittany Lions' starter in 1979, catching five passes for 90 yards and one touchdown.

He earned a Bachelor of Science in physical education from Penn State in 1979.

== NFL career ==
LaPointe had planned on becoming a teacher upon graduation, but was signed by the Baltimore Colts as a free agent following the 1980 NFL draft. Projected to be a starter that season, he was hampered all season by a hip pointer and torn rib cartilage and was released by Baltimore at the end of the season. He signed with the Oakland Raiders the following season, but suffered a career-ending injury in training camp. He signed an injury waiver and was released from the team.

== Personal ==
LaPointe returned to Penn State for graduate school. He began a second career in finance, and has worked for Kidder, Peabody & Co., Merrill Lynch, and Prudential Financial. LaPointe, his wife, Andrea, and their sons Luc and Will now live in Atlantic County, New Jersey, where he is an assistant administrator in training at SeaShore Gardens Living Center.
