= Goodwill Shoe Company =

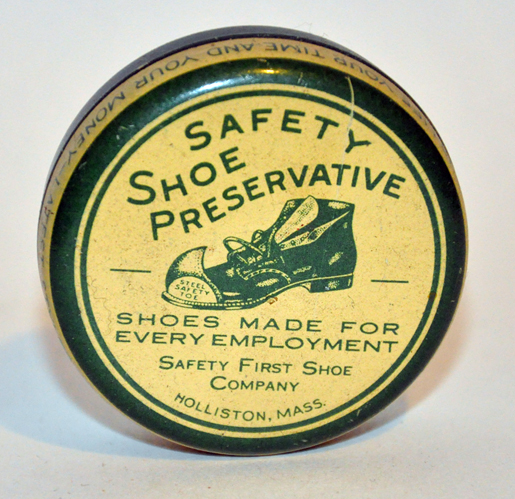
Early 20th century tin of Safety Shoe Preservative

Goodwill Shoe Company also known as Arthur A. Williams Shoes (after its founder) was a shoe brand specialized in leather shoes and steel toe "Safety First" boots. Among the earlier companies to produce such products at the time, it was one of the largest companies in manufacturing industrial boots by the 1930s. The company became bankrupt sometime in the mid-20th century.

Built in 1909, the Goodwill Shoe Company factory building remains at 26-28 Water Street, in Holliston, Massachusetts, today.

"This is a landmark example of a large show factory built at the peak of the shoe industry production, for the manufacture of heavy footwear for farmers and sportsmen. The two wood-frame buildings are located at either side of Water Street, and were originally connected by a second-story bridge above the street. [As well as an existing tunnel that exists beneath the pavement.] The building on the east side of the street is 4 stories high with a slate-roofed tower and is approximately 190 feet long; the building to the west is three stories in height and approximately 100 feet in length. Both still show their original clapboards and 6/6 sashes. Fenestration is characterized by bands of closely spaced, double hung, sash windows reaching the length of the facades."
