= Thomas Hollis (1659–1731) =

English merchant and a benefactor (1659–1731)

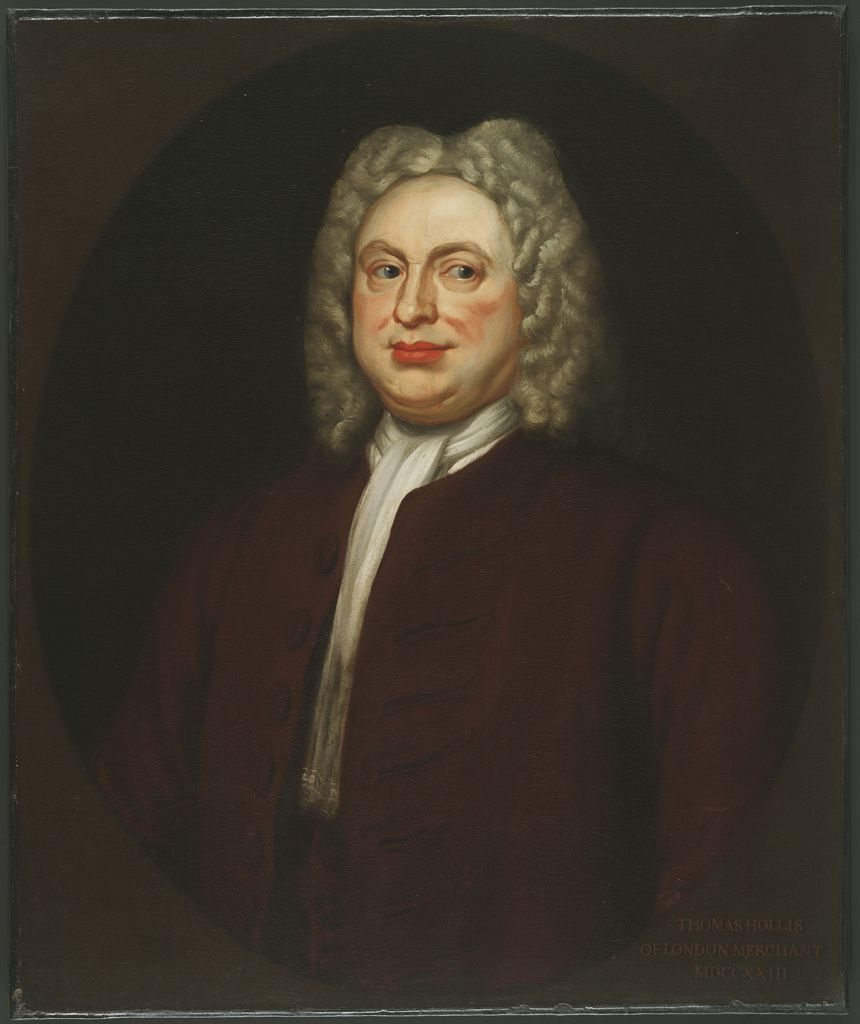
- Thomas Hollis, portrait by Giovanni Battista Cipriani
- Born: 1659
- Died: 1731 (aged 71–72)

Thomas Hollis (1659 – January 21, 1731) (Note: Hollis died in January 1730 by the Old Style calendar in use at the time, but in 1731 by New Style (modern) dating.) was a wealthy English merchant and a benefactor of Harvard University.

== Benefactions ==
As a Baptist and a Calvinist, Hollis required his donations to be used for directed purposes. For example, in 1721, he established the Hollis Chair of Divinity at Harvard, with a salary of £80 per year, with the stipulation that Baptists be included for consideration. This broadening constituted a form of dissent from strict adherence to the orthodoxy of the day, where New England's reform Protestantism was being buffeted by ripples and uncertainties generated by the Glorious Revolution of 1688/9. In 1726, he also endowed the Hollis Chair of Mathematics and Natural Philosophy with the same amount. Hollis also convinced his younger brothers, John and Nathaniel, to contribute substantially to Harvard and thus helped establish a legacy of civil and religious liberty across the Massachusetts Bay Colony decades before the American Revolution.

== Legacy ==
The towns of Hollis, New Hampshire and Holliston, Massachusetts are both named for him. Additionally, the neighborhood of Hollis in the New York City borough of Queens is named after the aforementioned New Hampshire locale, and thus indirectly after Thomas Hollis.

He is also the eponym of HOLLIS, the Harvard On-Line Library Information System.
