= East Holliston Historic District =

Historic district in Massachusetts, United States

- U.S. National Register of Historic Places
- U.S. Historic district
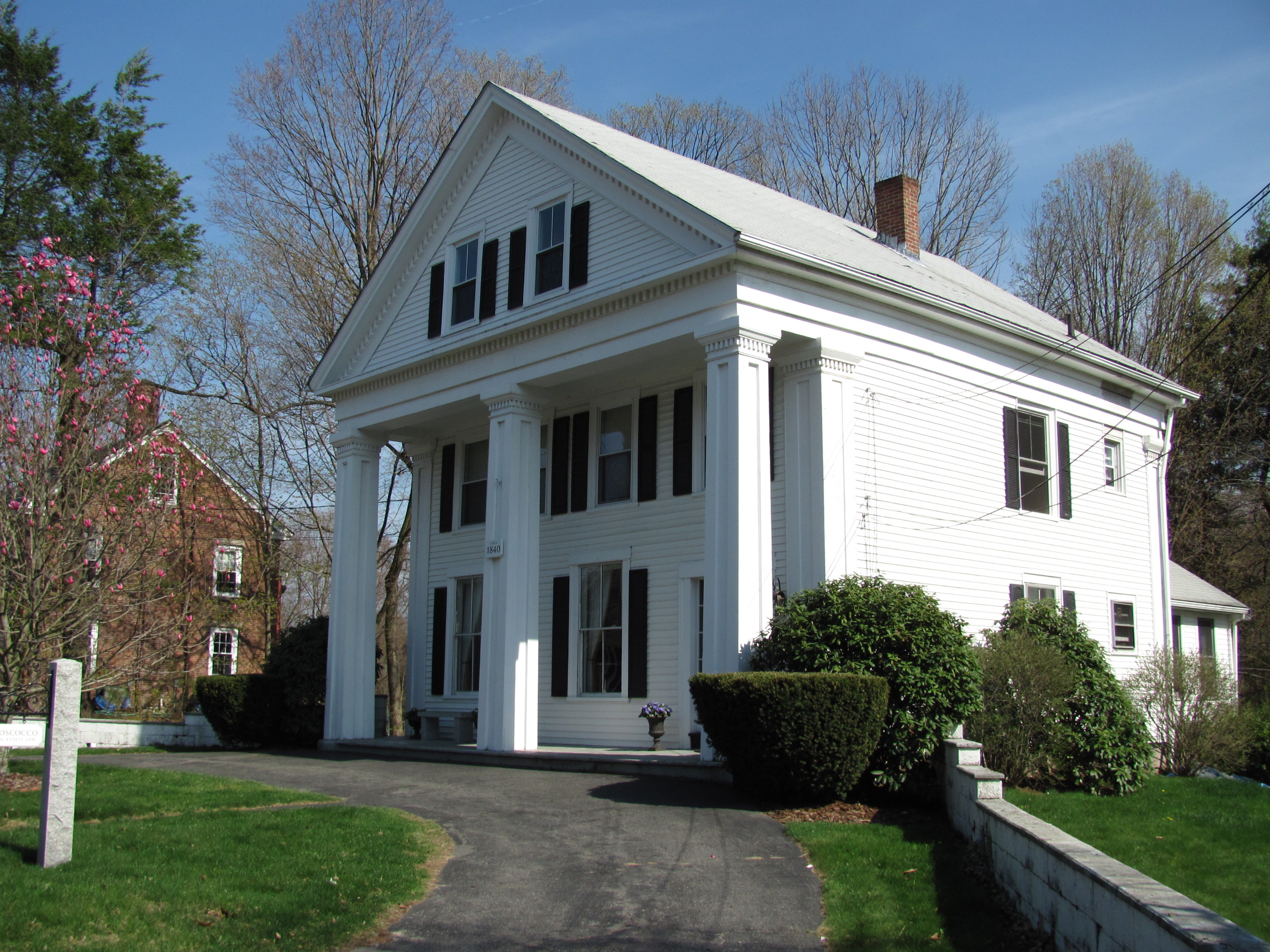
- A house on Washington Street, circa 1840

- Location within Massachusetts Location within the United States
- Location: Holliston, Massachusetts
- Coordinates: 42°12′50″N 71°25′14″W
- Architectural style: Georgian, Federal
- NRHP reference No.: 02000636
- Added to NRHP: June 14, 2002

The East Holliston Historic District encompasses an area of early colonial settlement and later development in Holliston, Massachusetts. The linear district extends along Washington Street (Massachusetts Route 16) between Old Locust Street and the northeast junction with Curve Street, and then the full length of Curve Street. The area includes some of Holliston's early settlements, including the site of its first meeting house, near Curve Street and Jarr Brook. In the late 18th and early 19th centuries Jarr Brook became a point of industrial development, leading to the construction of a number of Greek Revival houses. Significant construction ended in the district around 1870.

The district was listed on the National Register of Historic Places in 2002.

== See also ==
- National Register of Historic Places listings in Middlesex County, Massachusetts
