= Springville, Indiana =

Springville, Indiana may refer to:

- Springville, Clark County, Indiana
- Springville, LaPorte County, Indiana
- Springville, Lawrence County, Indiana
