= Holliston High School =

Location
- 370 Hollis Street; Holliston, Massachusetts 01746; United States

Information
- Type: Public; Open enrollment
- Motto: Pride, honor and service
- Established: 1831
- Superintendent: Susan Kustka
- Principal: David List
- Teaching staff: 62.26 (FTE)
- Grades: 9-12
- Enrollment: 803 (2023-2024)
- Student to teacher ratio: 12.90
- Campus type: Suburban
- Colors: Red and White
- Athletics conference: Tri-Valley League
- Mascot: Panthers
- Accreditation: NEASC
- Newspaper: The Vision
- Yearbook: The Mt. Hollis
- Website: Holliston High School
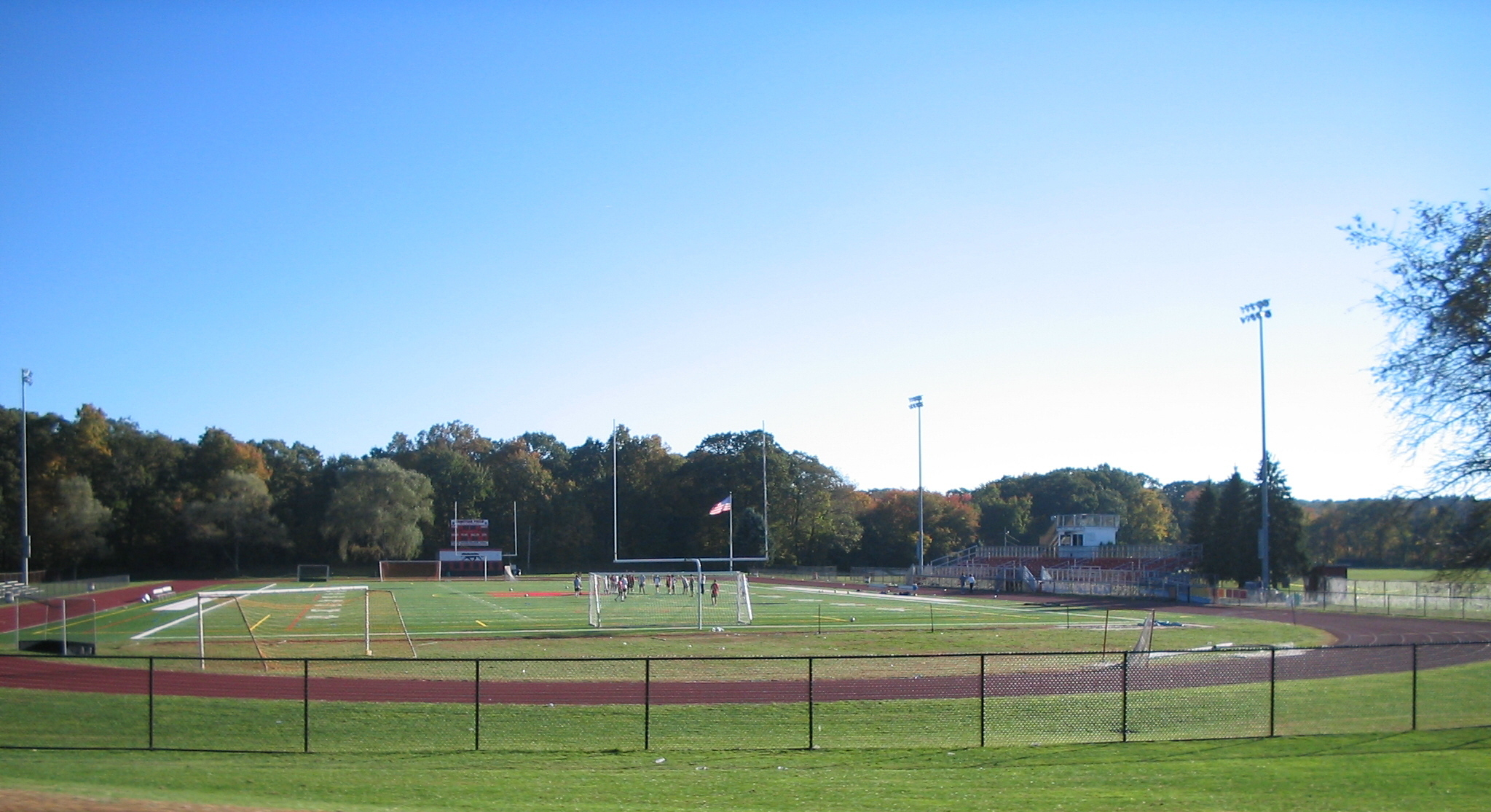
- Holliston High School athletic field

Holliston High School is the public secondary school serving Holliston, Massachusetts, United States. As of 2018, the school enrolled 809 students. The current principal is David List. MCAS, ACT, and SAT scores of Holliston High School students are consistently well above both state and national averages.

== History ==
The first class to graduate from HHS consisted of 9 students in 1868. Their mascot was the Mt. Hollis hogs. The first high school was the Walker high school, built on the site of the Mt. Hollis Seminary (The Cutler School was later built on its charred remains). To accommodate the growing population a new school was built in 1957 near the Flagg Middle School, now known as Robert Adams Middle School. The current school building on 370 Hollis Street opened in September 1969. The mascot has been changed to the Panthers. On December 15, 2025, plans to build a new multi-million dollar building was revealed to the district.

== Campus ==
Holliston High has a small campus a half-mile away from downtown Holliston. It consists of a large building containing an auditorium, field house, and lab spaces. HHS athletic fields include a baseball diamond, softball diamond, football field that seats over 1,000, and large practice fields. The field house is home to the HHS volleyball and basketball teams as well as the winter track and wrestling teams.

== Curriculum ==
Holliston has a regular curriculum for a school of its size. Its departments are: Mathematics and Business, Science and Technology, English, Social Studies, Foreign Language, and The Arts. It teaches Spanish, French, Latin, and Mandarin Chinese as foreign languages, and offers musical, drama, and studio arts. HHS offers over ten Advanced Placement courses as well as numerous honors, CPI, and CPII level courses.

== Extracurricular activities ==
Holliston High School offers many different extracurricular activities. Fall Sports include: boys & girls cross-country, boys & girls soccer, cheerleading, field hockey, football, golf, and volleyball. Winter sports include: boys & girls basketball, boys & girls track, ice hockey, swim & dive, and wrestling. Spring sports include boys & girls lacrosse, boys & girls tennis, boys & girls track, baseball, softball, and ultimate. The current athletic director is Craig Najarian.

Clubs include: Art Club, Best Buddies, Environmental Club, ENIGMA Literary Magazine, model UN, NHS, peer leaders, Student Advisory Council, Student Council, French Club, GSA Club (Gay-Straight Alliance), Students Against Destructive Decisions, N.E.R.D. club and a FIRST Robotics Competition team.

The high school is one of a handful in Massachusetts which still retains a class-D FM radio station- WHHB 99.9 FM.

== Athletics ==
Holliston High School has a well-respected athletics program. All teams compete in the Tri-Valley League. In 2009 and 2010, the Football team took the Tri-Valley league championship and went all the way to the Super Bowl. In 2010, the team won the MIAA Division III-A Super Bowl. In 2011, the Wrestling team took the Tri-Valley league champion title. In 2013, the Boys Soccer team won the Tri-Valley League title.

Football Accomplishments

- State Champions - (6) 1971, 1981, 1985, 2010, 2014, 2015
- State Finalists - (5) 1975, 1976, 1989, 1991, 2009
- Tri-County League Championships: 1925
- South Central League Championships: (3) 1959, 1961, 1962
- Tri-Valley League Championships: (17) 1970, 1971, 1972, 1975, 1976, 1981, 1982, 1985, 1989, 1990, 1991, 2004, 2009, 2010, 2011, 2014, 2015
- Undefeated Seasons: 1903, 1971, 1972

== Notable alumni ==
- Adam Green, filmmaker
- Paul Loscocco, former member of the Massachusetts House of Representatives
- Jo Dee Messina, American country music artist
- Mark Sweeney, former professional baseball player
- Kevin Systrom, co-founder of Instagram
- Kara Wolters, former US Women's Olympic Basketball Team
- Ron LaPointe, former professional football player
