= Springville Township, Susquehanna County, Pennsylvania =

Township in Pennsylvania, United States

Springville Township, Pennsylvania
- Township
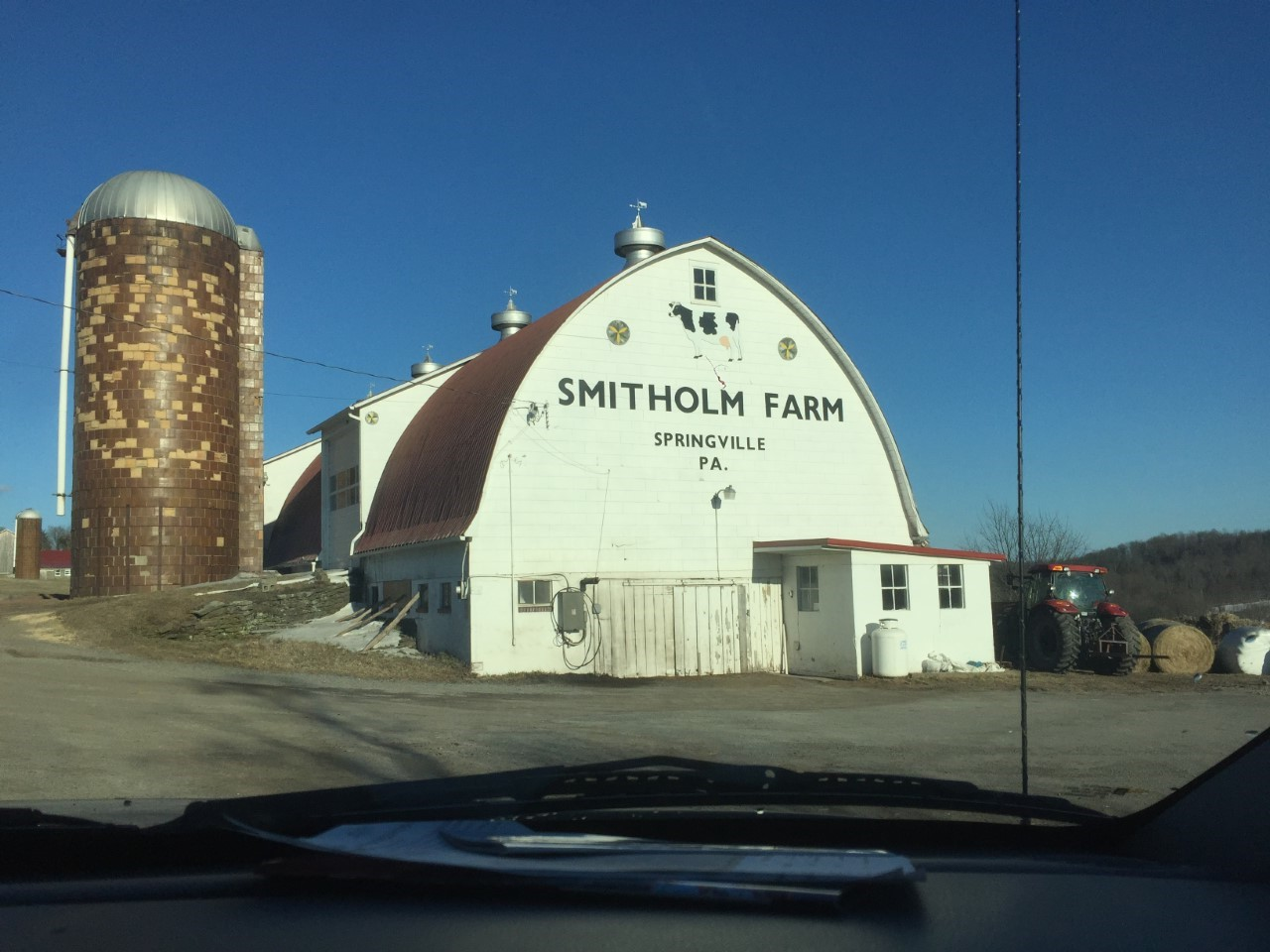

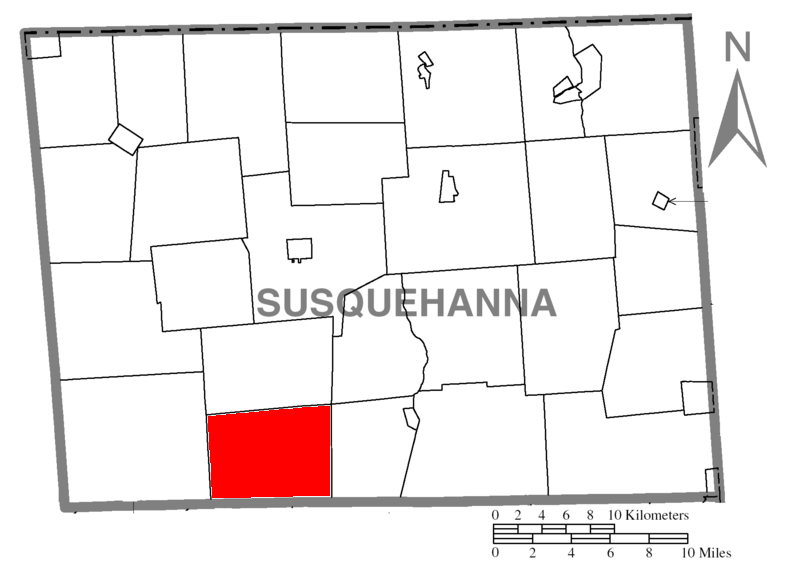

- Location of Pennsylvania in the United States
- Coordinates: 41°40′00″N 75°54′59″W
- Country: United States
- State: Pennsylvania
- County: Susquehanna
- Settled: 1800
- Incorporated: 1833

Area
  - Total: 30.83 sq mi (79.84 km^{2})
  - Land: 30.59 sq mi (79.24 km^{2})
  - Water: 0.23 sq mi (0.60 km^{2})

Population (2020)
  - Total: 1,469 ▼
  - Estimate (2021): 1,478
  - Density: 50.1/sq mi (19.35/km^{2})
- Time zone: UTC-5 (EST)
  - Summer (DST): UTC-4 (EDT)
- ZIP Code: 18844
- Area code: 570
- FIPS code: 42-115-73440

Springville Township is a township in Susquehanna County, Pennsylvania, United States, that was formed during the April Session (of the Court of Quarter Sessions) in 1814. The population was 1,469 at the 2020 census.

== Geography ==
According to the United States Census Bureau, the township has a total area of 30.8 square miles (80 km^{2}), of which, 30.6 square miles (79 km^{2}) of it is land and 0.2 square miles (0.52 km^{2}) of it (0.65%) is water.

== Demographics ==
Historical population
Census	Pop.	Note	%±
2010	1,641		—
2020	1,469		−10.5%
2021 (est.)	1,478		0.6%
U.S. Decennial Census

As of the census of 2010, there were 1,641 people, 631 households, and 474 families residing in the township. The population density was 53.6 inhabitants per square mile (20.7/km^{2}). There were 720 housing units at an average density of 23.5/sq mi (9.2/km^{2}). The racial makeup of the township was 99% White, 0.2% African American, 0.1% Native American, 0.2% Asian, 0.1% from other races, and 0.3% from two or more races. Hispanic or Latino of any race were 1% of the population.

There were 631 households, out of which 29.2% had children under the age of 18 living with them, 60.9% were married couples living together, 8.2% had a female householder with no husband present, and 24.9% were non-families. 19.3% of all households were made up of individuals, and 8.6% had someone living alone who was 65 years of age or older. The average household size was 2.60 and the average family size was 2.93.

In the township the population was spread out, with 21.6% under the age of 18, 61.6% from 18 to 64, and 16.8% who were 65 years of age or older. The median age was 43.5 years.

The median income for a household in the township was $51,136, and the median income for a family was $54,286. Males had a median income of $37,188 versus $25,625 for females. The per capita income for the township was $21,062. About 9.4% of families and 12.9% of the population were below the poverty line, including 22.5% of those under age 18 and 10.7% of those age 65 or over.
