= Byron Tau =

American journalist

- Education: McGill University; Georgetown University
- Occupation: Journalist
- Years active: 2011-present
- Employer: The Wall Street Journal

Byron Tau is a Pulitzer-prize winning American journalist and investigative reporter in the Washington DC bureau of ProPublica. Previously, he was a reporter for The Wall Street Journal, the Associated Press and Politico. He covers the Department of Justice and was previously a White House reporter. His book Means of Control was published on February 27, 2024.

== Education ==
Tau graduated with a B.A.degree in political science and North American history from McGill University in Montreal in 2008. He completed an MA degree in journalism at Georgetown University in Washington, D.C. in 2011.

== Career ==
Tau began his journalism career at Politico as a news assistant to Ben Smith, helping Smith run his politics blog, before being made a fully-fledged reporter in 2011. His remit was covering national politics (including the 2012 presidential campaign), and the White House. He left Politico in 2014 to join The Wall Street Journal as a White House reporter in time for the 2016 presidential election. Tau was considered among the lead writers at The Journal covering the investigation into Russian interference in the 2016 election and obstruction of justice by special counsel Robert S. Mueller III. After the election, Tau began writing about national security issues as the Capitol Hill Correspondent for The Journal..

Tau regularly appears on radio and television networks including WNYC and C-SPAN.

He's a native of Holliston, Mass.
