= Holliston, Massachusetts =

- Town
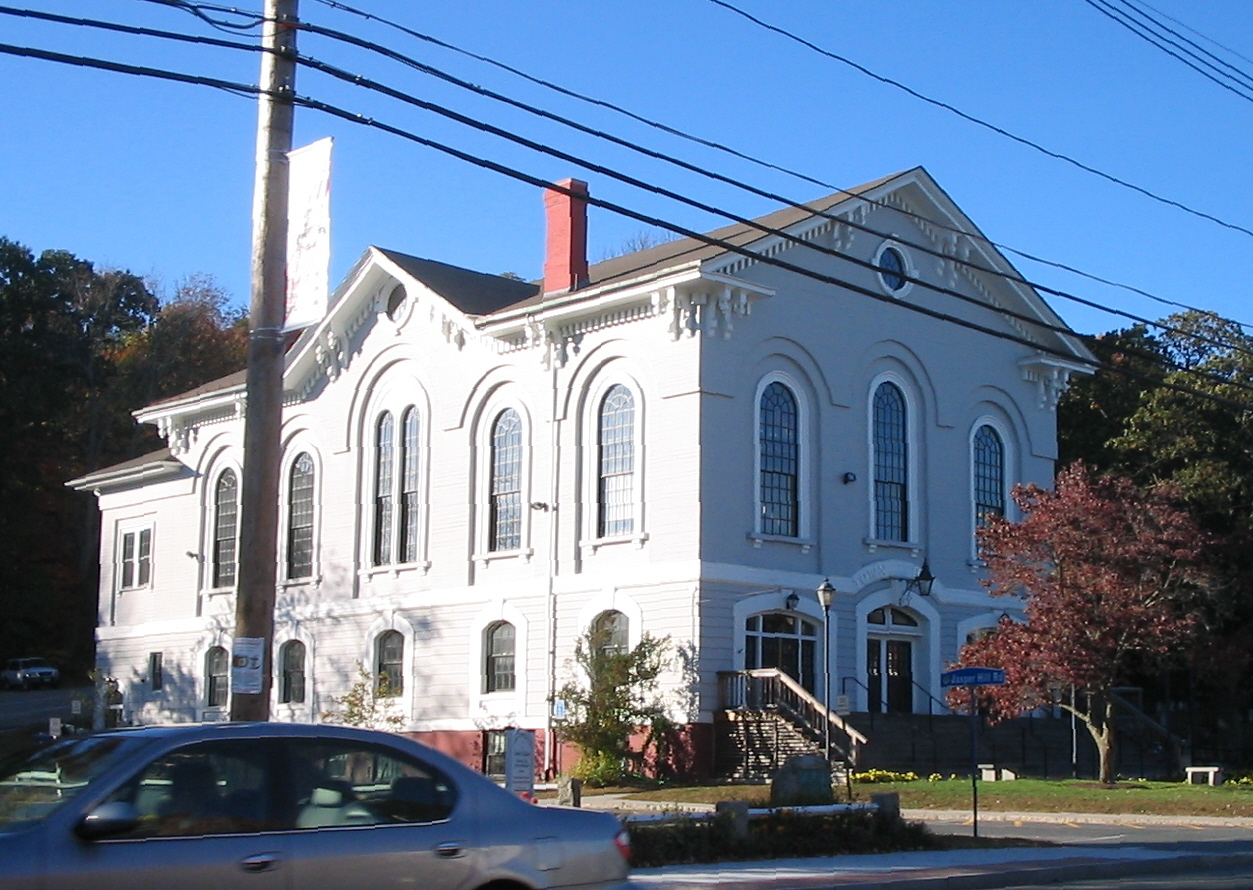
- Holliston Town Hall on the east border of the town green

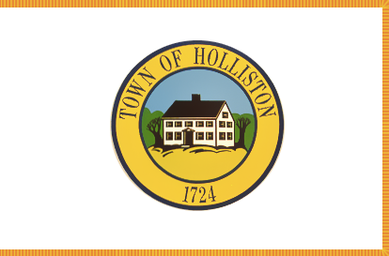
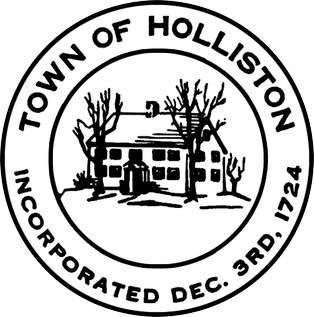
- Flag Seal

- Location in Middlesex County in Massachusetts
- Coordinates: 42°11′00″N 71°25′30″W
- Country: United States
- State: Massachusetts
- County: Middlesex
- Settled: 1659
- Incorporated: 1724
- Named for: Thomas Hollis

Government
  - Type: Open town meeting
  - Town Administrator: Frank Gervasio

Area
  - Total: 19.0 sq mi (49.3 km^{2})
  - Land: 18.7 sq mi (48.5 km^{2})
  - Water: 0.35 sq mi (0.9 km^{2})
- Elevation: 187 ft (57 m)

Population (2020)
  - Total: 14,996
  - Density: 801/sq mi (309/km^{2})
- Time zone: UTC−5 (Eastern)
  - Summer (DST): UTC−4 (Eastern)
- ZIP Code: 01746
- Area code: 508/774
- FIPS code: 25-30700
- GNIS feature ID: 0618225
- Website: www.townofholliston.us

Holliston is a New England town in Middlesex County, Massachusetts, United States in the Greater Boston area. The population was 14,996 at the 2020 census and is now estimated at 15,206 according to the V2025 estimate. It is located in MetroWest, a Massachusetts region that is west of Boston. Holliston is the only town in Middlesex County that borders both Norfolk and Worcester counties.

== History ==
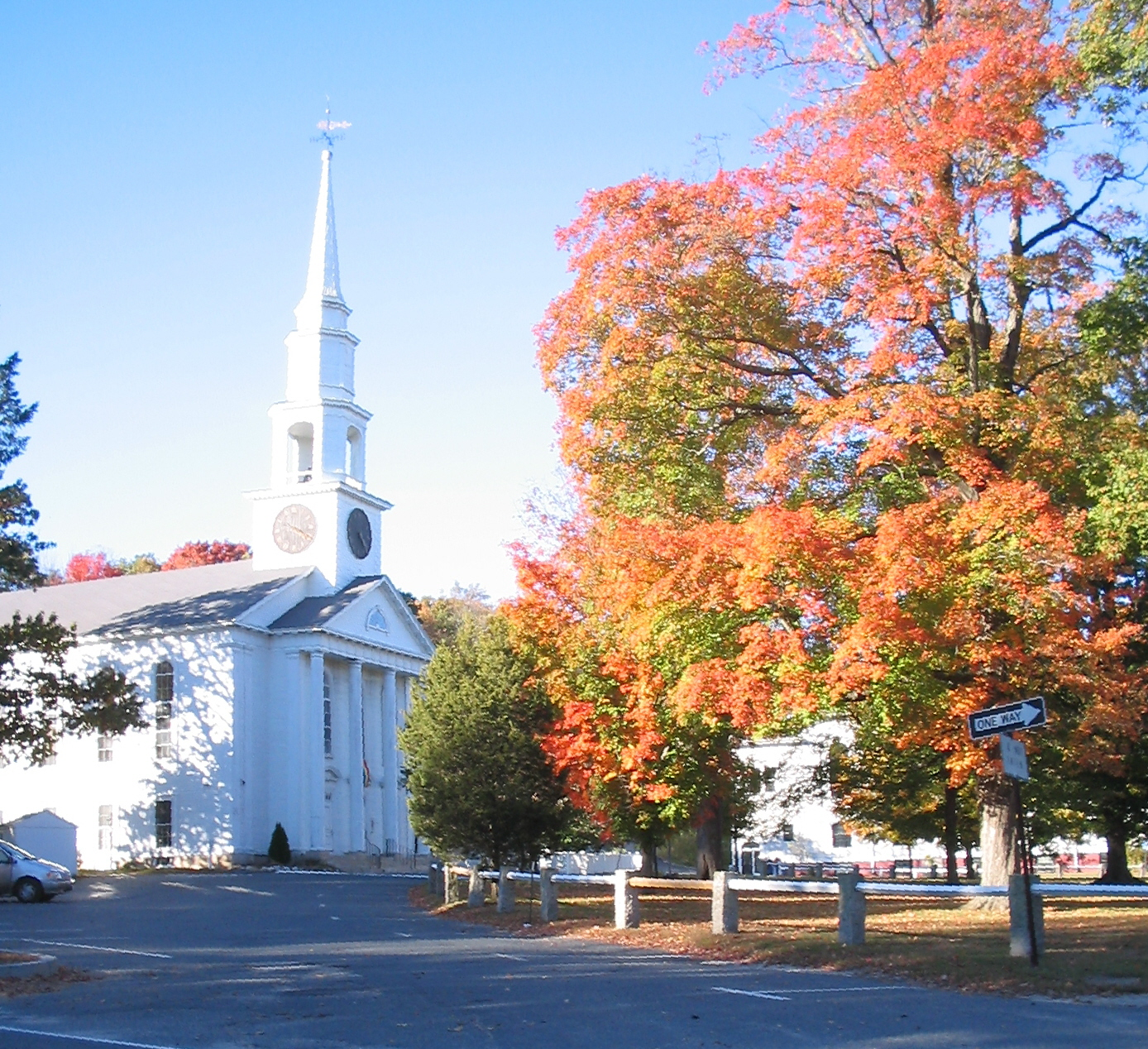
First Congregational Church of Holliston on the church green. This is the site of Holliston's original meeting house.

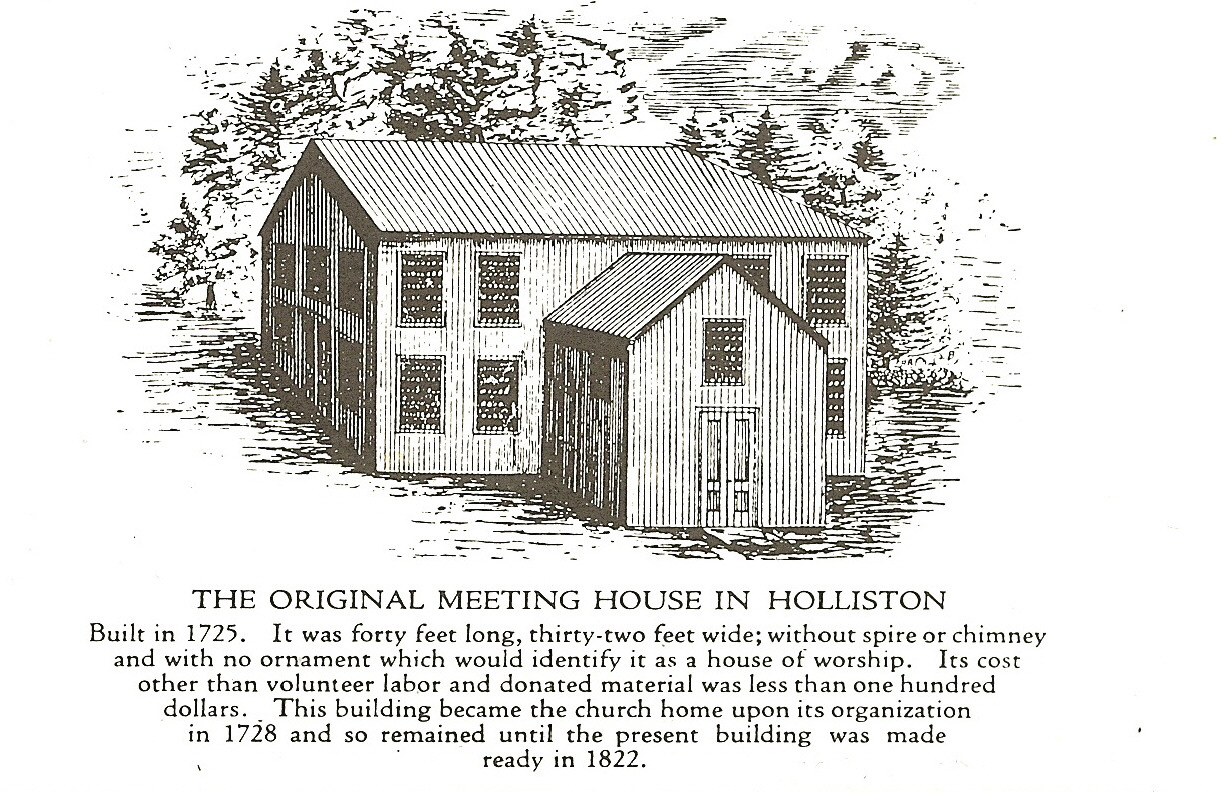
A 19th century depiction of Holliston's original meeting house. Built in 1725, it served as the center of all town affairs until being razed 1822 for the present-day First Congregational Church and the town hall.

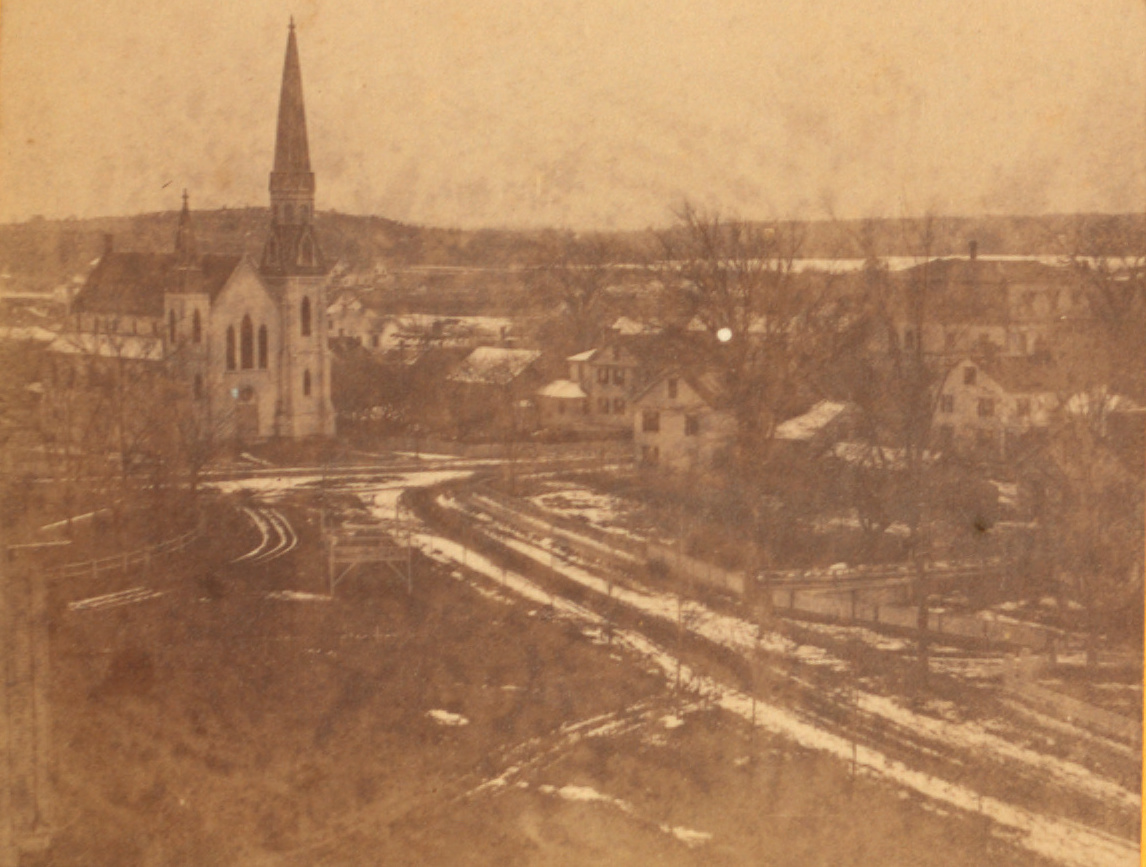
Panorama of Holliston, c. 1875

At the time of the earliest European settlements, where Holliston exists now was part of the territory of the Awassamog family of Natick (the first Nipmuc praying town), who also held authority over land near Waushakum Pond at Framingham and land near Annamasset at Mendon. In 1701, a large tract of land that included the west half of Holliston, eastern Milford and parts of Hopkinton and Ashland was given to the local Nipmucs in a land exchange with Sherborn. Their ownership of the tract was brief, as settlers purchased tracts of land there until all traces of Nipmuc presence disappeared. The Nipmuc village of Mucksquit (translation – "place of much grass"), located on the shore of Wennakeening (translation – "smile of the great spirit") was near the site of the Morse family farm, today known as Lake Winthrop. The Morses, Sheffields, Marshalls and Bullards and many others followed Pout Lane (an old Native American foot-path, now partly modern day Rte 16 and Highland St., respectively) out to the new territory and settled along the path, thus forming a cluster of farms that would eventually become Holliston. John Eliot and Daniel Gookin (Christian missionaries) also followed the path in search of converts to Christianity and encouraged the Nipmucs to gather into villages, which made their task of finding them easier. Though not as famous as the Bay Path or the Old Connecticut Path, Pout Lane played a major role in the settlement of Holliston and other points southwest of Boston. Holliston, then part of Sherborn, was first settled by Europeans in 1659 by Massachusetts Bay Puritans. The town of Holliston was incorporated on December 3, 1724, by virtue of approval by the General Court petition requesting that "the western part of Sherborn be a Town." The name was taken in honor of Thomas Hollis of London, a benefactor of Harvard College. The first town meeting was held at the house of Timothy Leland on December 23, 1724, "at which five selectmen and all other required officers were chosen." The town has grown from a community of a few hundred residents setting aside ten pounds per year for public education to a community of over 13,000 with an annual budget of over $40 million including more than $23 million for a nationally recognized school system.

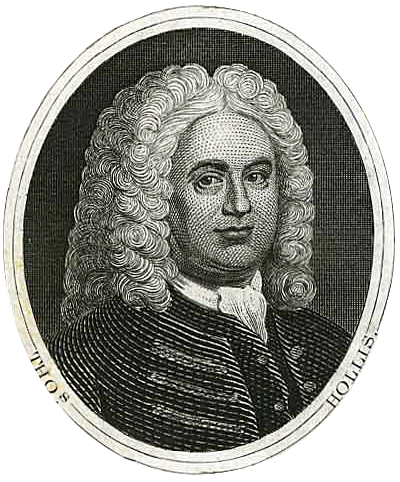
Town namesake and Harvard benefactor Thomas Hollis, as he appeared on the Holliston Savings Bank's $5 notes in the mid-19th century.

In "Holliston" by Images of America and the Holliston Historical Society, it is written: An article in a local newspaper in 1894 heralded the charms of Holliston as the quintessential New England village, which, the story said, sprang into existence solely due to the talent of its people. Perhaps this is so, for there was no great moment in history to mark the founding of this town. Holliston has become a reflection of the accomplishments of the inhabitants of this place for more than three hundred years, and although the town had to admit to no magnitude of greatness to rival Boston, Lexington, or Concord, Holliston did define itself as a home to heroes of the commonplace. The feature story of 1894 said:

"Many cities have sprung into existence because of their advantageous situations. The prosperity of Holliston is solely due to the genius of its people. A visit to such places stirs the blood, quickens the pulse and produces an enthusiastic desire to have a share in the developing good times. Massachusetts may be Whittier's land, and the region from Marblehead to Amesbury may be full of legendary and spectral armies, and witchdom, and Buddha knows what, but the imaginative and the poetical must submit to the rights of the commonplace. The commonplace is honeycombed with the uncommon heroisms of the patient, everyday existence that make up the life of such plucky towns as Holliston. These are the things the average man is most interested in. Average life is but a portfolio of views of struggles with the commonplaces of everyday existence" (Holliston 1997).

The town was once the largest producer of shoes in the United States. Although many of the shoe factories have been lost by fires and other problems, the largest company, the Goodwill Shoe Company, still has remaining empty factories on Water Street, many of which are now used as artists' studios. Competition from overseas factories is largely to blame for the loss of the industry.

Holliston's Mudville neighborhood claims to be the location of the 1888 Ernest Lawrence Thayer poem, "Casey at the Bat", and maintains an ongoing rivalry with Stockton, California, which makes the same claim regarding the poem's setting.

=== The Legend of Balancing Rock ===
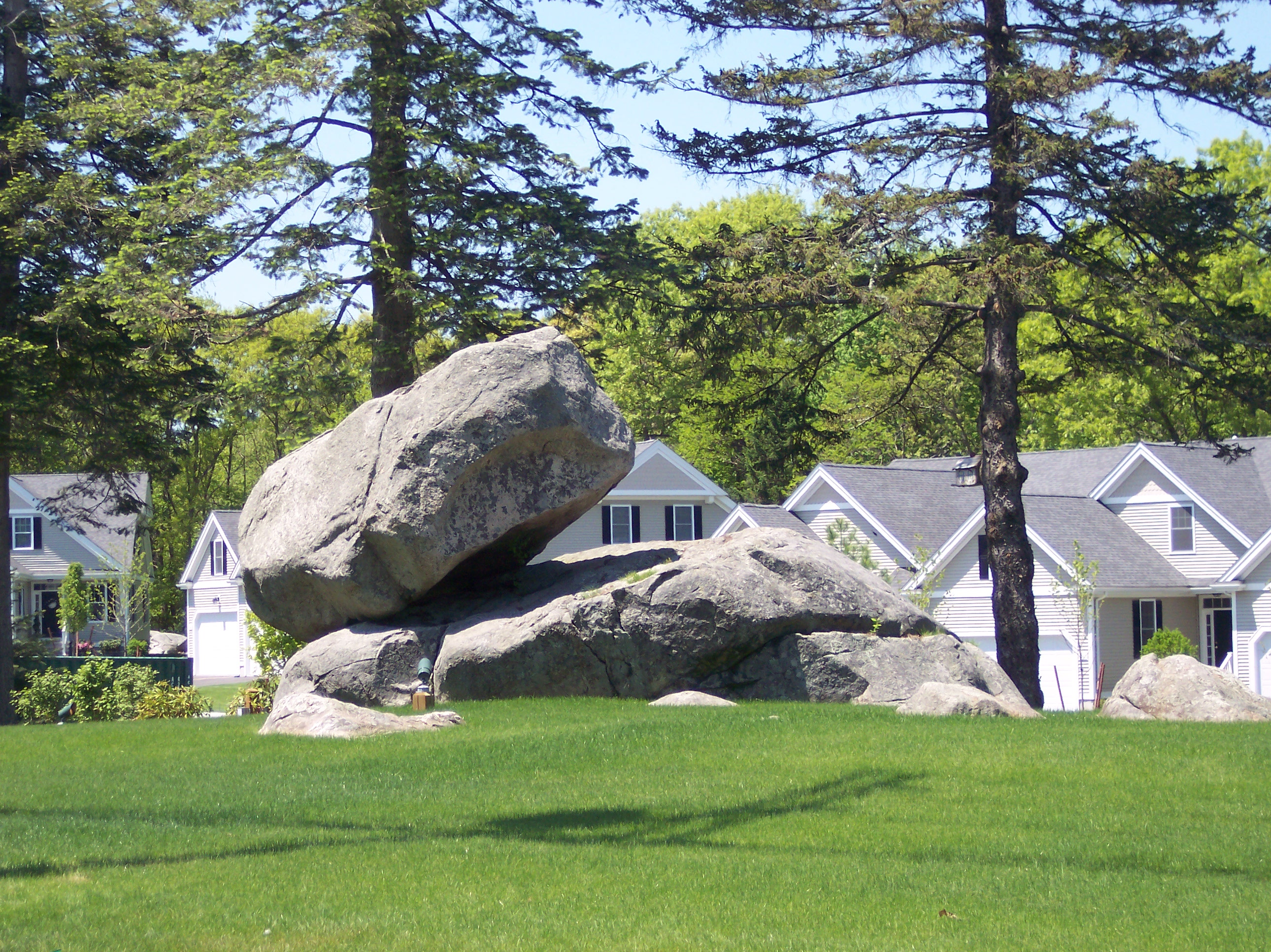
Holliston Balancing Rock

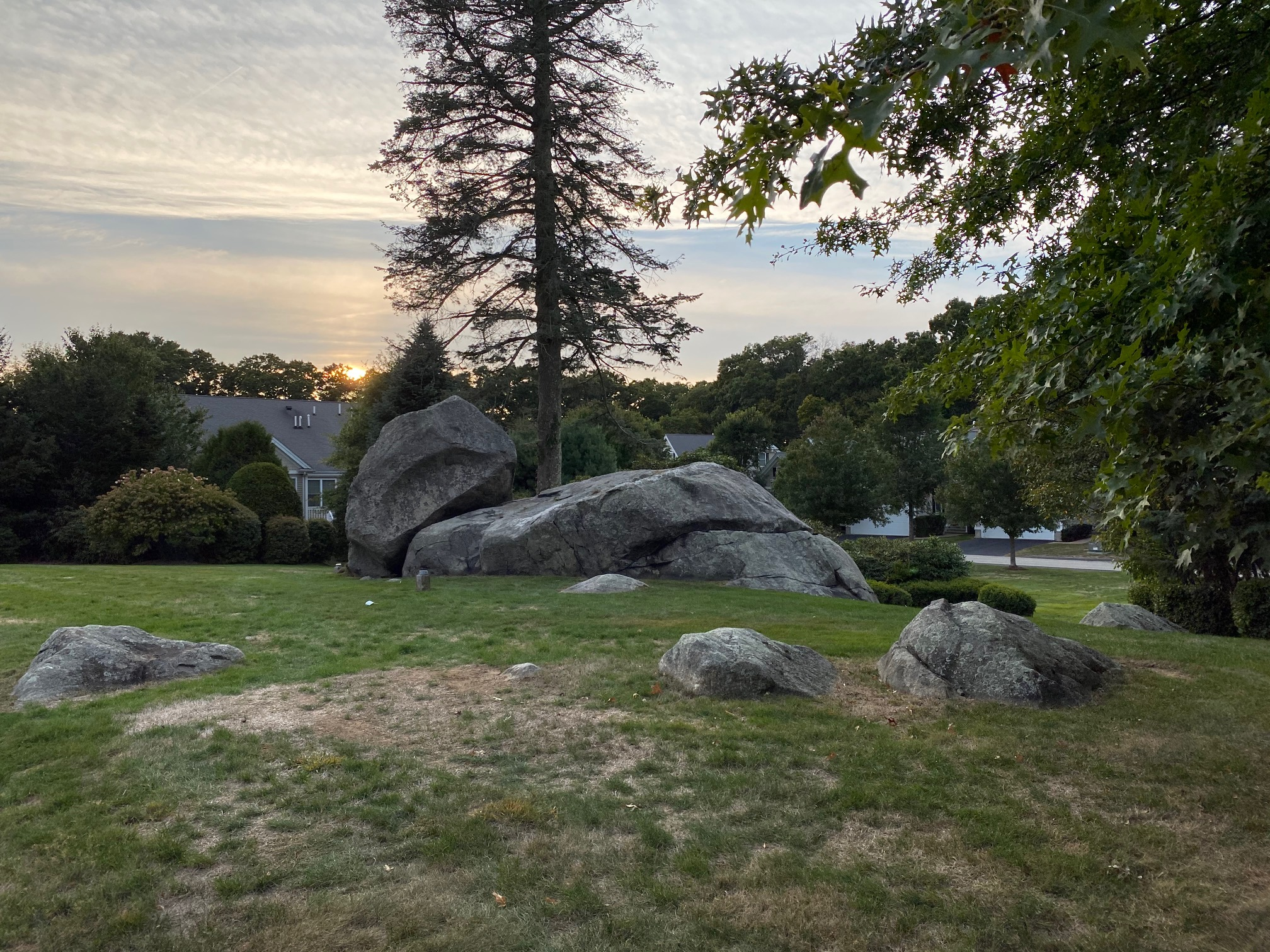
Balancing Rock, after it fell.

On the north side of Route 16 heading into Milford sits a large rock, some 20 ft (6.1 m) in length, 10 ft (3.0 m) in width, 6 ft (1.8 m) thick, and weighing easily over 5 tons (4.5 metric tons). The rock appears to be balanced precariously on an outcrop of granite ledge. On November 6, 1789, General George Washington led his entourage from Boston to New York via this route. He recalled in his diary the road in Holliston that would eventually be honored with his name, "an indifferent road, diversified by good and bad land, cultivated and in woods, some high barren, others low, wet and piney." Legend has it that, as they came across this "Balancing Rock," they took the opportunity to have some fun and tried their best to tip over the rock. It is said that the General himself, quite amused at the spectacle, added his muscle in an attempt to push the rock off its natural pedestal. Their efforts—and those of many others over the years—were to no avail. On September 22, 2020, Balancing Rock appears to have finally fallen. The rock is on the property of the Balancing Rock development, a community for "active" adults over the age of 55.

== Geography ==
According to the United States Census Bureau, the town has a total area of 19.0 square miles (49 km^{2}), of which 18.7 square miles (48 km^{2}) is land and 0.3 square miles (0.78 km^{2}) is water. Water covers 1.73% of the town's total area. The Charles River passes near the southern region of town.

It is located 21.6 mi (34.8 km) west of Boston and is within short driving distance of Interstate 495 and the Massachusetts Turnpike (part of Interstate 90). Massachusetts Route 16 and Massachusetts Route 126 pass through the town.

=== Historic districts ===

With a history spanning nearly three centuries, Holliston has many smaller divisions within its borders with names tied to a host of historic and cultural origins. Although the town is only served by one post-office today, several of its historic villages originated from previous post offices as well as train stops on the Boston and Albany Railroad's Milford line. Today the town retains two official historic districts, both of which contain smaller landmark areas of historic significance. There are several additional residential developments and other areas of Holliston which retain their own colloquial names, however at this time the following are the only areas officially recognized as historic by the town and the U.S. Geologic Survey.

- Braggville
- East Holliston
- Gooch Corners
- Metcalf
- Thomas Hollis Historic District
  - Mudville
- Brentwood
- Lakeside

=== Adjacent towns ===
Holliston is located in eastern Massachusetts, bordered by:

- Sherborn on the east
- Millis on the southeast
- Medway on the south
- Milford on the southwest
- Hopkinton on the northwest
- Ashland on the north

== Demographics ==
Historical population
Year	Pop.	±%
1765	705	—
1776	909	+28.9%
1790	875	−3.7%
1800	783	−10.5%
1810	989	+26.3%
1820	1,024	+3.5%
1830	1,304	+27.3%
1840	1,782	+36.7%
1850	2,428	+36.3%
1860	3,339	+37.5%
1870	3,073	−8.0%
1880	3,098	+0.8%
1890	2,619	−15.5%
1900	2,598	−0.8%
1910	2,711	+4.3%
1920	2,707	−0.1%
1930	2,804	+3.6%
1940	3,000	+7.0%
1950	3,753	+25.1%
1960	6,222	+65.8%
1970	12,069	+94.0%
1980	12,622	+4.6%
1990	12,926	+2.4%
2000	13,801	+6.8%
2010	13,547	−1.8%
2020	14,996	+10.7%
2022*	14,856	−0.9%
* = population estimate. Source: United States census records and Population Estimates Program data.

As of the census of 2000, there were 13,801 people, 4,795 households, and 3,842 families residing in the town. The population density was 737.8 inhabitants per square mile (284.9/km^{2}). There were 4,868 housing units at an average density of 260.2 per square mile (100.5/km^{2}). The racial makeup of the town was 96.7% White, 0.9% African American, 0.9% Native American, 1.2% Asian, 0.3% from other races, and 0.8% from two or more races. Hispanic or Latino of any race were 1.4% of the population. Ancestries of Holliston residents are reported to be Irish (29.4%), Italian (18.3%), English (17.8%), German (9.7%), French (5.6%), and Polish (5.6%).

There were 4,795 households, out of which 44.2% had children under the age of 18 living with them, 70.2% were married couples living together, 7.5% had a female householder with no husband present, and 19.9% were non-families. Of all households, 16.4% were made up of individuals, and 6.0% had someone living alone who was 65 years of age or older. The average household size was 2.87 and the average family size was 3.25.

In the town, the population was spread out, with 30.0% under the age of 18, 4.8% from 18 to 24, 29.4% from 25 to 44, 26.9% from 45 to 64, and 8.9% who were 65 years of age or older. The median age was 38.2 years. For every 100 females, there were 96.3 males. For every 100 females age 18 and over, there were 91.8 males.

In 2000, the median income for a household in the town was $78,092, and the median income for a family was $84,878. Males had a median income of $48,473 versus $36,405 for females. The per capita income for the town was $32,116. As of the census of 2000, about 1.5% of families and 2.4% of the population were below the poverty line, including 2.9% of those under age 18 and 9.5% of those age 65 or over.

In 2009, 79% of Holliston residents age 25 and over held bachelor's degrees or higher and 35.8% held graduate or professional degrees.

== Government ==
Holliston retains its original open town meeting form of government, in which registered voters act as the town's legislature. The town's day-to-day affairs are overseen by an elected Board of Selectmen with a Town Administrator.

County government: Middlesex County
Clerk of Courts:	Michael A. Sullivan
District Attorney:	Marian T. Ryan
Register of Deeds:	Maria C. Curtatone
Register of Probate:	Tara E. DeCristofaro
County Sheriff:	Peter J. Koutoujian
State government
State Representative(s):	James Arena-DeRosa (D)
State Senator(s):	Karen E. Spilka (D)
Governor's Councilor(s):	Robert L. Jubinville (D)
Federal government
U.S. Representative(s):	James McGovern (D-2nd District)
U.S. Senators:	Elizabeth Warren (D), Ed Markey (D)

== Education ==
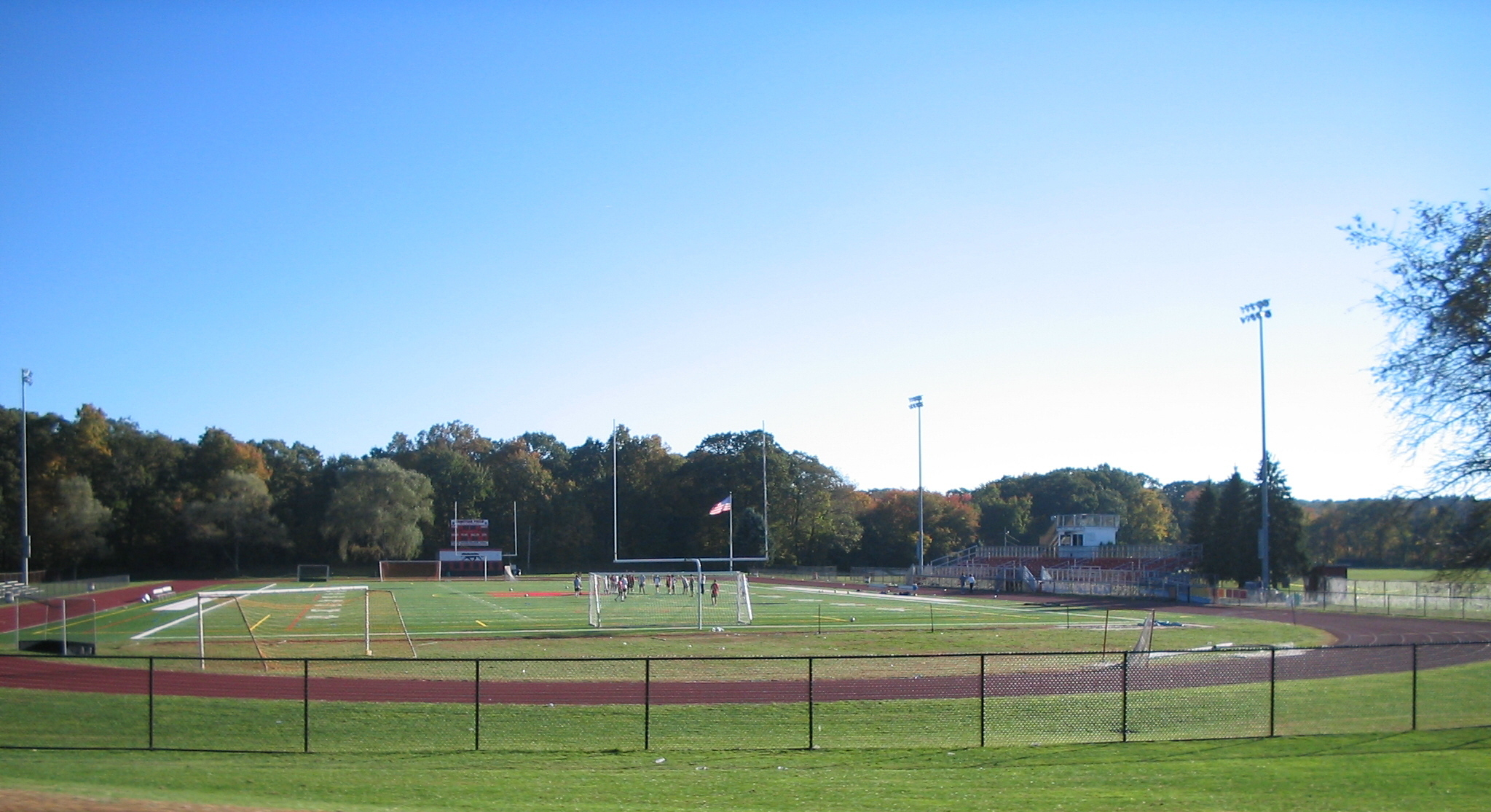
Holliston High School athletic field

The Town of Holliston has a public school system which serves students from kindergarten through twelfth grade. Schools in the district include two elementary schools, a middle school and a high school. Public schools include: Sam Placentino Elementary School, Fred W. Miller Elementary School, Robert H. Adams Middle School, and Holliston High School.

Holliston High School was ranked among the top 150 best public high schools in Greater Boston.

The Holliston public school system also maintains a Montessori and French Immersion program that students can enroll in upon entering kindergarten.

== Environment ==
Within Holliston there are five registered Superfund sites. Three of these sites are still monitored by CERCLIS (Comprehensive Environmental Response, Compensation, and Liability Information System).

Name of site	Location	Status
Adams Street Property	519 Adams Street	Archived
Wood Engineering	29 Everett Road	Archived
Axton Cross Corp	1 Cross Street	Non-NPL (National Priorities List)
Bird Property (Prentice Street Property)	708 Prentice Street	Non-NPL
Photofabrication Engineering Inc.	229 Lowland Street	Non-NPL

An archived status indicates that the site has been cleaned, requires no further investigation, and poses little to no threat. A Non-NPL status indicates the sites are not considered to be the most hazardous by the EPA and are therefore not included in the NPL, but the clean-up of the site has not been completed. Non-NPL sites are still monitored by CERCLIS and are considered open or active sites. An NPL status indicates that the EPA considers the site to pose serious health and environmental risks. NPL sites are considered to be the most hazardous sites in the nation.

=== Axton Cross Corp ===
Established in 1967, "the site was an Industrial Chemical Distributor for the textile, paper, rubber, metals and plastics industries." In the early 1990s the company filed for bankruptcy and the facility closed. The site is 8.6 acres of developed and undeveloped land which consist of two buildings. The buildings are being considered for demolition.

According to the Mass DEP Axton Cross is considered to be a Disposal Site. The chemicals recorded by the Mass DEP were oil and other unknown hazardous materials. According to locals, "Axton-Cross polluted the property it owned and the land surrounding it and the wildlife with toxic chemicals." According to the EPA's last inspection (August 8, 1995), the water was not impaired, but the Ozone is considered to be a Non-Attainment Area. No further data was recorded.

=== Bird Property (Prentice Street Property) ===
In 1966 a gravel mining permit for the property was granted to a Charles Bird. Mining of the land continued into the late 1970s. Through the late 1960s to early 1980s the mined areas were filled with building debris and commercial solid waste. The property was also used for tire stockpiling. The site is approximately 53 acres. The land is being considered for the construction of residential housing.

Since then the Mass DEP and EPA have ordered remedial activities which included the removal of: potential contaminants, solid waste, construction debris, tires, and over 70 tons of impacted soils. The groundwater plume from the site contains low levels of a chemical called TCE. Due to the low and naturally declining levels (due to the removal of the source) the Mass DEP to conclude that no further water clean-up is required. Other chemicals recorded by the Mass DEP were VOCs. According to the EPA's inspection the Ozone is considered to be a Non-Attainment Area. No further data was recorded.

=== Photofabrication Engineering Inc. ===
Founded in 1968, Photofabrication Engineering, Inc. (PEI) manufactures precision metal parts for computers and semiconductors. The company moved from Holliston to Milford, MA in 1984. The newer facility has helped PEI become an environmentally cleaner manufacturer.

Chemicals recorded by the Mass DEP were chlorinated solvents, metals, and wastewater discharge. The Mass DEP considers the site to be in phase IV of V. In this phase a cleanup plan is implemented. According to the EPA's inspection, the water was not impaired, but the Ozone is considered to be a Non-Attainment Area. No further data was recorded.

== Points of interest ==
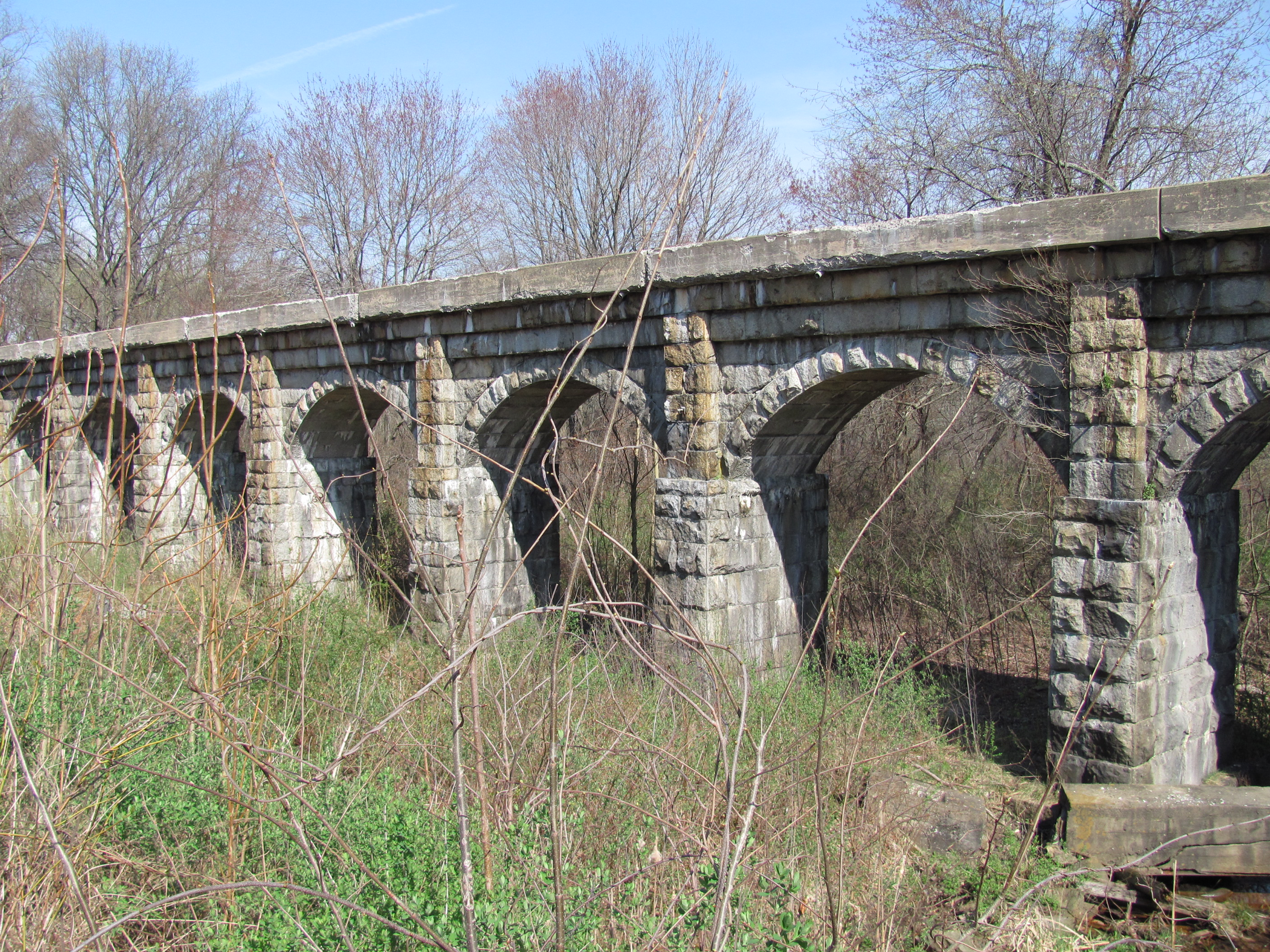
Arch Bridge off Woodland Street

- Bogastow Brook Viaduct, also known as the Arch Bridge, off Woodland Street, named as one of the 1,000 places to visit in Massachusetts
- Bullard Farm, the preserved homestead of the Bullard family, some of the first settlers of the town. Established in 1652, it served as the family's farm until 1916.
- Fatima Shrine, a restful haven in a peaceful rustic setting, Fatima Shrine is an oasis for prayer, reflection, and meditation. The rosary walk at Fatima Shrine is believed to be the world's largest rosary.
- Fiske's General Store, founded in 1863, is the oldest retail business in town. Known for its catchphrase, "'most everything".
- First Congregational Church of Holliston, built on the site of Holliston's original meeting house, is the holding institution of the King James Bible donated by Thomas Hollis in 1724.
- Holliston Police Station is host to one of the American sycamore trees which flew as seeds to the moon on Apollo 14.
- Lake Winthrop is nearly 1 mile (1.6 km) in diameter and covers approximately 140 acres (57 ha). It was originally called "Dean Winthrop's Pond." and used as a boundary marker for his land. Dean was the son of John Winthrop. The town history states that the Nipmuck tribe, a clan of the Algonquian Indians, lived on the lake's southwestern shore in the village of Musquit near present-day Lake Grove Cemetery. The lake was then called Wennakeening, meaning "smile of the great spirit" or "pleasant smile". Today, Lake Winthrop offers fishing, kayaking, and swimming. In season 5 episode 4 of the sitcom "Cheers" Woody, Norm and Cliff go on a fishing outing to Lake Winthrop.
- Mount Hollis Lodge A.F. & A.M., founded in Holliston on February 14, 1865. This Masonic Lodge resides in a historic building that was once the Methodist Church in Holliston.
- Upper Charles River Trail, a scenic, recreational path for bicycling, walking, cross-country skiing, roller-blading, and other non-motorized uses. When completed, the 20-mile (32 km) trail will connect Holliston to Ashland, Hopkinton, Milford, and Sherborn.

=== Golf courses ===
- Pinecrest Golf Club, 18-hole golf course

=== Parks and playing fields ===
- Goodwill Park, playground for children, tennis courts, baseball and soccer fields
- Patoma Park, Stoddard Park's sister park offers woodland trails for hiking and recreational activities
- Pleasure Point, located on Lake Winthrop with a beach, picnic area, playground, and boat launch
- Stoddard Park, located on Lake Winthrop with a beach, picnic area, and recreational area (two youth baseball/softball diamonds)
- Weston Pond, multi-sport practice and soccer playing fields.
- Damigella Field, large baseball diamond and softball fields, part of the elementary and middle school complex.
- Kamitian Field, multi-sport artificial turf surface, part of the high school complex.
- Marshall Street Soccer Fields (Private, managed by Holliston Youth Soccer)

== Notable people ==
- Arthur Judson Brown, clergyman, missionary, author
- Lyndon Byers, retired NHL right-wing, formerly a radio personality for The Hill-man Morning Show
- Mike Condon, goalie for the Ottawa Senators, played for the Montreal Canadiens and briefly for the Pittsburgh Penguins
- McKay Coppins, journalist, political personality
- Adam Green, director, writer and or actor for movies Hatchet and Frozen among other horror films
- Mike Grier, forward for Edmonton Oilers, Washington Capitals, Buffalo Sabres and San Jose Sharks
- Michael Mantenuto, actor (Jack O'Callahan in Miracle)
- Greg Mauldin, center for Austrian Hockey League's KHL Medveščak Zagreb, previously played for the NHL's Columbus Blue Jackets, New York Islanders, and Colorado Avalanche
- Jo Dee Messina, popular country music singer
- Andrew Natsios, director, United States Agency for International Development
- Shirley Nelson, award-winning author
- Albert P. Rockwood, early Latter Day Saint leader
- John Sencio, national television personality – HGTV, NBC, MTV
- Ken Stone, UFC bantamweight fighter
- Mark Sweeney, first baseman, pinch hitter for San Diego Padres, Milwaukee Brewers, Colorado Rockies and Los Angeles Dodgers
- Kevin Systrom, co-founder of Instagram
- Byron Tau, Pulitzer Prize-winning journalist
- Jeff Taylor, founder of Monster.com, University of Massachusetts graduate
- Amy Townsend-Small, director of the Environmental Studies Program at the University of Cincinnati
- Kara Wolters, professional basketball player and Olympic medal winner
- Ron LaPointe, NFL player
