= Erich Lindemann =

American physician (1900–1974)

Lindemann E. Doctorate in psychology in 1922

Erich Lindemann (2 May 1900 in Witten, Germany — 16 November 1974 in Boston, MA) was a German-American writer and psychiatrist, specializing in bereavement. He worked at Massachusetts General Hospital in Boston as the Chief of Psychiatry and is noted for his extensive study on the effects of traumatic events on survivors and families after the Cocoanut Grove night club fire in 1942. His contributions to the field of mental health led to the naming of a joint Harvard University–Commonwealth of Massachusetts-run mental health complex in Boston in his honor, the Erich Lindemann Mental Health Center.

== Education ==
Lindemann was a graduate of the University hospital Gießen und Marburg and the Academy of Medicine in Düsseldorf, earning his doctorate in psychology in 1922 and his doctorate in medicine in 1927. In the same year he earned a fellowship to Harvard Medical School, and in 1929 made his move to the United States permanent.

== Work ==
Author of "Symptomatology and Management of Acute Grief", a paper on posttraumatic stress disorder. It was published in September 1944.

Studied the survivors of the Cocoanut Grove fire (1942), which was the deadliest nightclub fire in United States history.

Developed the field of Community Mental Health and Social Psychiatry. Erich and his wife, Elizabeth, created the first community mental health center in the United States: the Human Relations Service of Wellesley.
