= Boston Government Service Center =

Government complex in Boston, Massachusetts

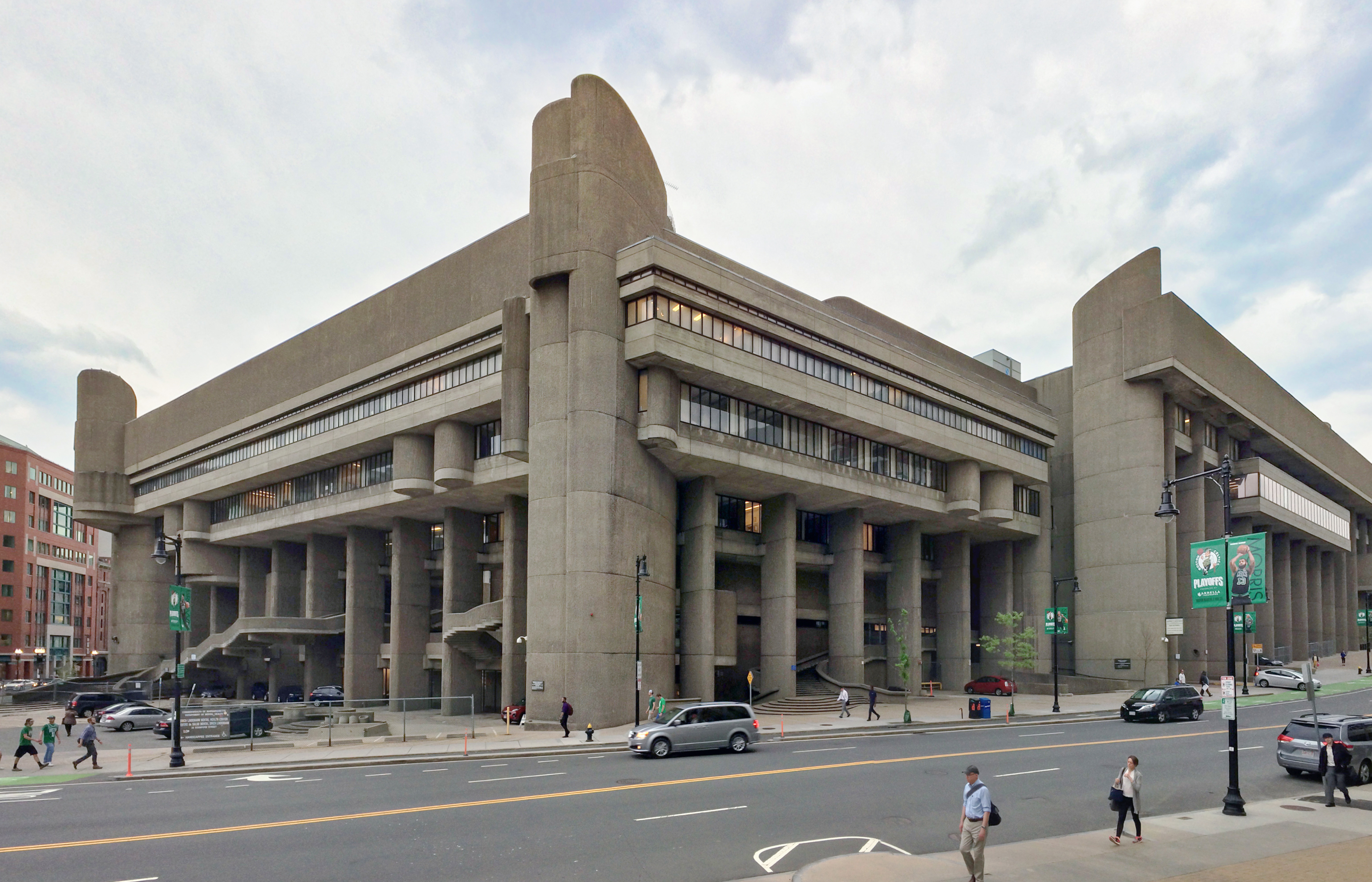
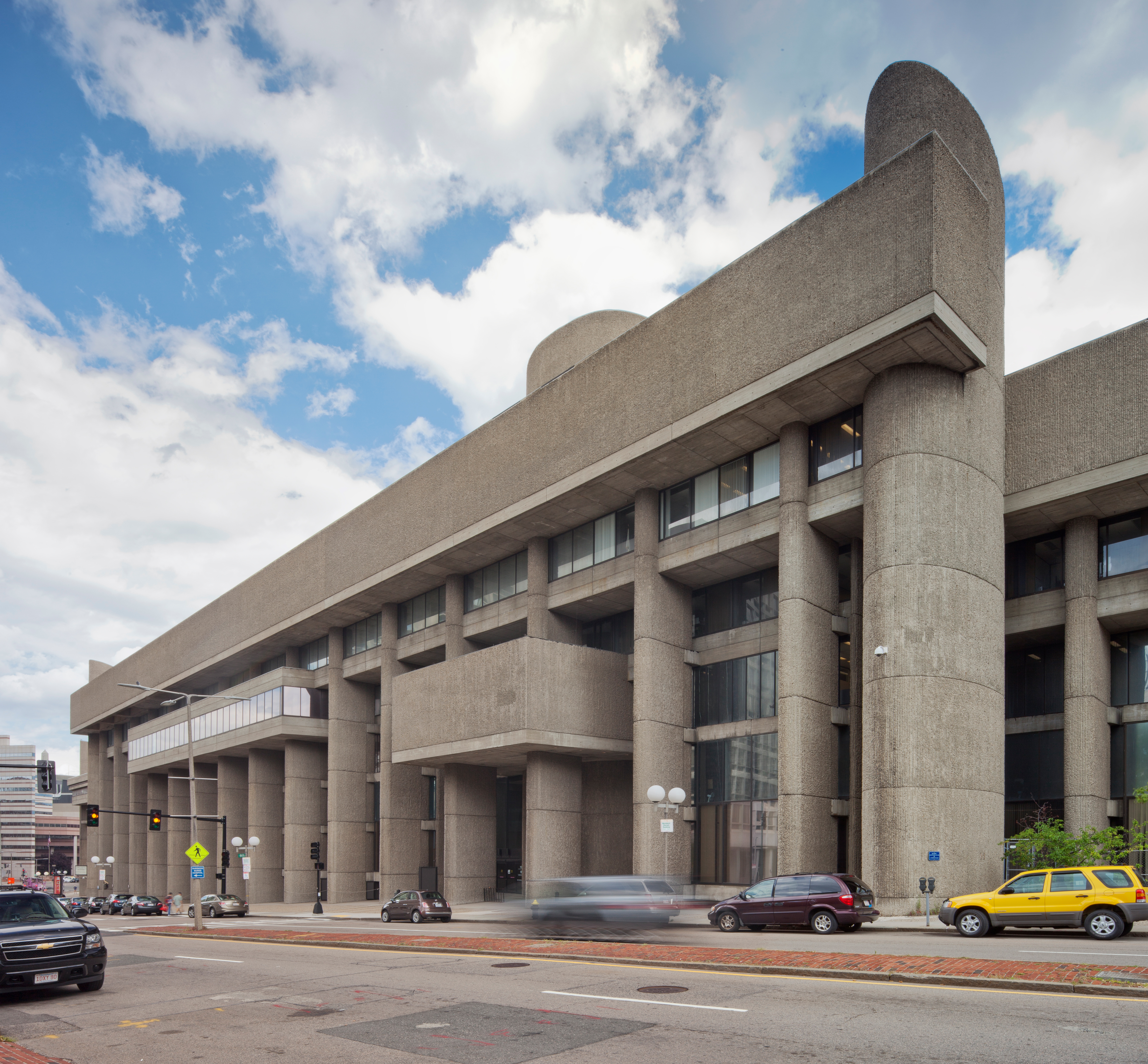
- The Erich Lindemann Building (top) and Charles F. Hurley Building (bottom)
- Interactive map of the site, with the Hurley and Lindemann building locations overlaid

General information
- Architectural style: Brutalist
- Location: 19 and 25 Staniford Street, Boston, Massachusetts
- Coordinates: 42.362768°N 71.063437°W
- Groundbreaking: August 1, 1963
- Completed: September 22, 1971
- Owner: Commonwealth of Massachusetts

Technical details
- Material: Concrete
- Floor count: 6
- Floor area: 363,781 sq ft (33,796.4 m^{2})
- Grounds: 8.5 acres (3.4 ha)

Design and construction
- Architect: Paul Rudolph
- Architecture firm: M.A. Dyer, Pedersen & Tilney, Desmond & Lord, Shepley Bulfinch Richardson and Abbott
- Structural engineer: Souza & True; Wm. J. LeMessurier & Associates Inc.
- Main contractor: Vappi Construction Company

Other information
- Parking: Employee garage, metered street parking
- Public transit: Blue Line Bowdoin (North Station, Haymarket nearby)

The Boston Government Service Center (BGSC) is a state government complex in the West End of Boston, Massachusetts. The center was designed in the Brutalist style, led by architect Paul Rudolph. It is one of the major components of the Government Center complex in Downtown Boston. The complex is made up of two connected Brutalist buildings: the Charles F. Hurley Building and the Erich Lindemann Building, as well as a courtyard. The Edward W. Brooke Courthouse, built 1998, is sometimes considered part of the complex.

The complex is eligible for listing on the Massachusetts Register of Historic Places and the National Register of Historic Places, and as a Boston Landmark. Its association with Rudolph and its distinctive architectural style make it eligible for National Historic Landmark designation, but as of 2026 the buildings do not hold any landmark designations.

== Names ==
The complex is officially known as the Joseph A. Langone, Jr. Memorial Center; it was named for the Massachusetts state senator in 1962. Older references have used the names "Government Service Center" (this name is easily confused with Government Center as a whole), the "State Services Center", or the "State Health, Education and Welfare Services Center". Newer references erroneously use the Lindemann or Hurley names to refer to the entire complex.

== Site ==
The Boston Government Service Center occupies an 8.5-acre (3.4 ha) site, a superblock at the base of Beacon Hill in Boston. The block sits at the eastern border of the West End neighborhood, adjacent to the Financial District. On the site are two large buildings, structurally separate yet connected, that snake around a plaza, aligned with the street except with three corners squared off, creating three small streetside plazas around the building. One of these, Merrimac Plaza, holds a surface parking lot. The southern plaza was partially created to provide a view of the Old West Church to viewers east of the building.

The Brutalist complex comprises two connected parts, the Charles F. Hurley Building (at 19 Staniford St.) and the Erich Lindemann Building (at 25 Staniford St.) The Hurley section houses the Division of Unemployment Assistance, MassHire, and other labor- and workforce-related offices of state government. The Lindemann building houses the Central Office of the Massachusetts Department of Mental Health. Also in the complex is the Edward W. Brooke Courthouse, completed in 1998. The buildings are all owned by the Commonwealth of Massachusetts.

=== Plaza ===
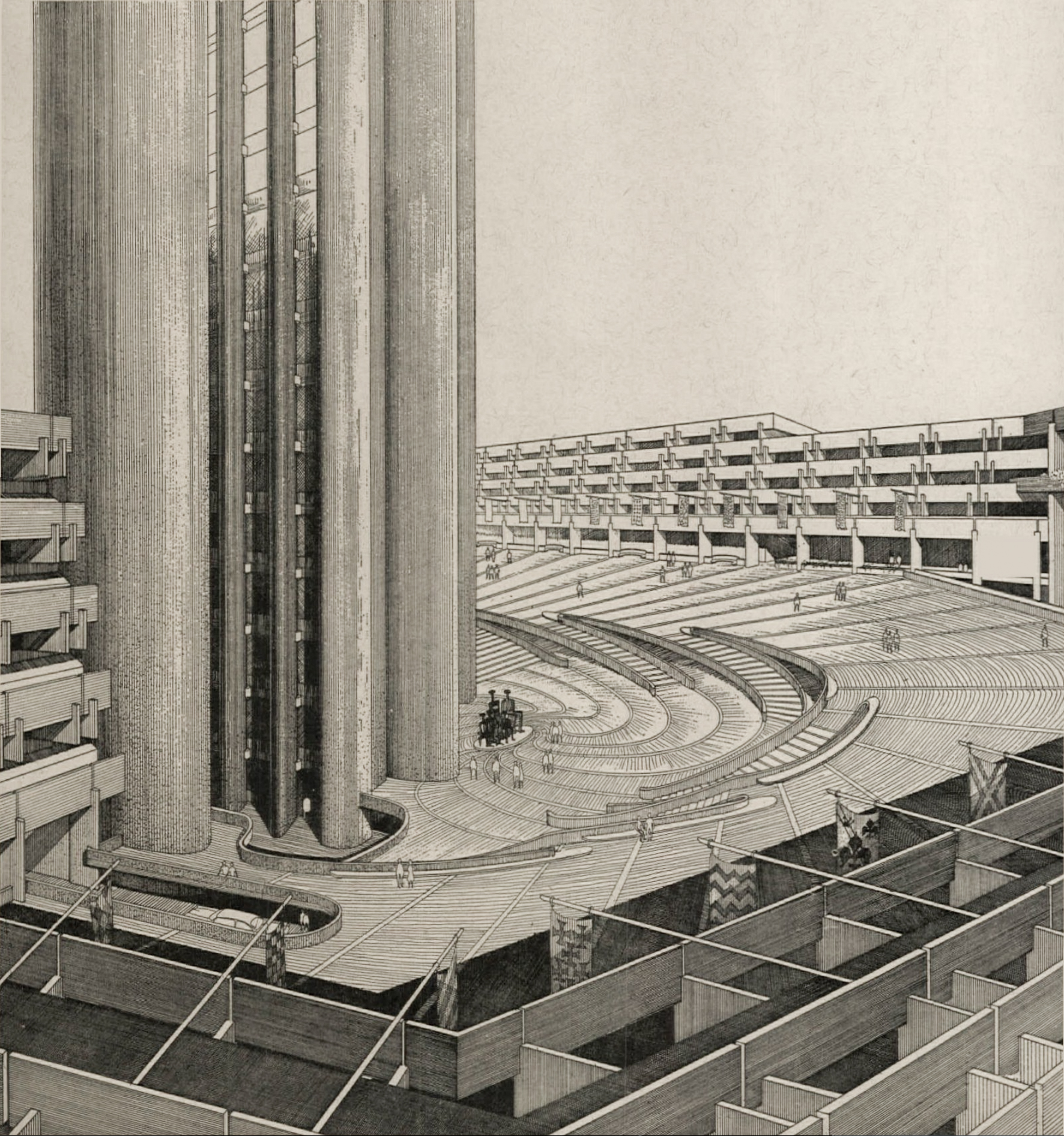
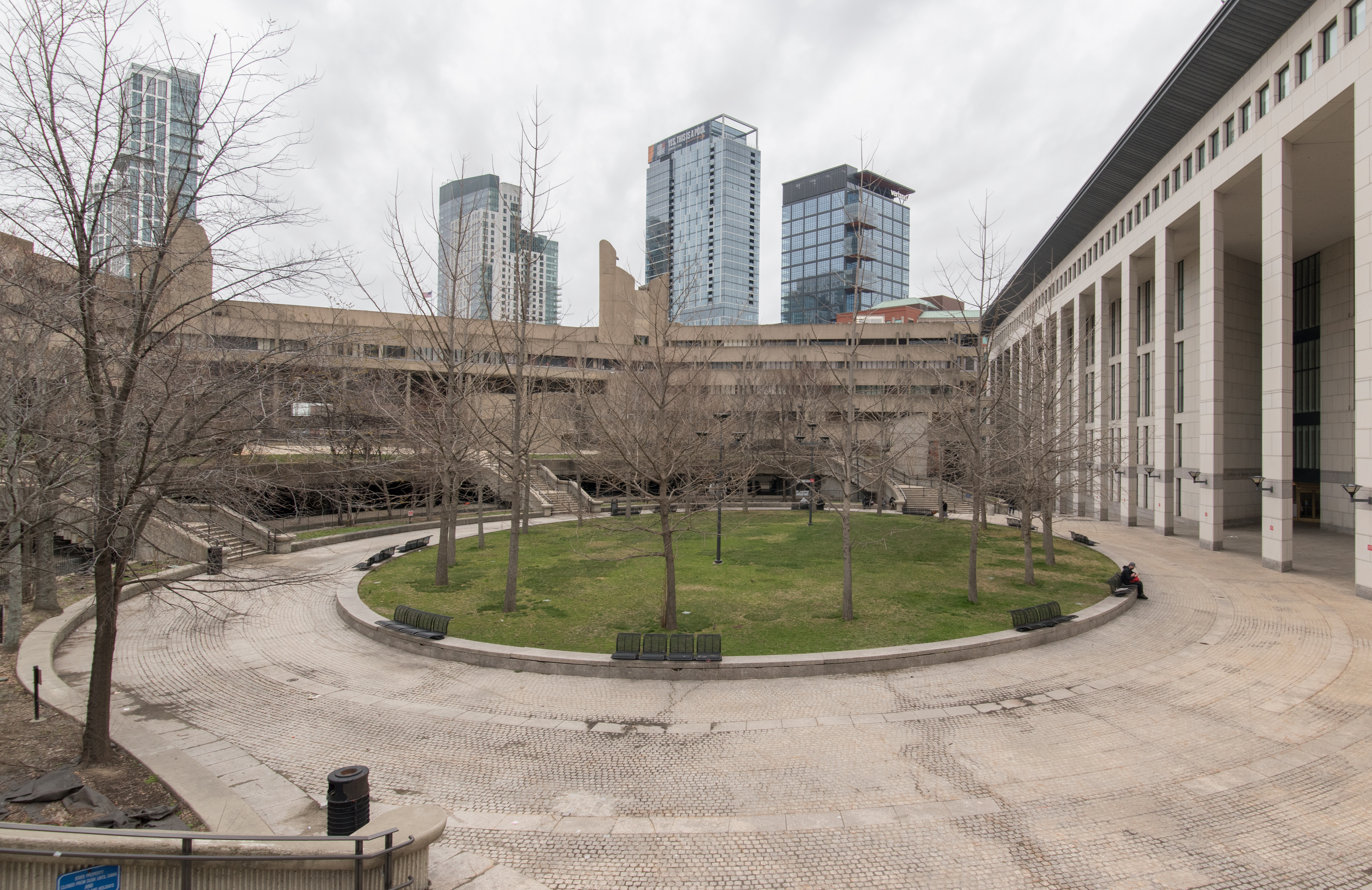
Original and current plaza designs

The building surrounds a large pedestrian plaza, which sits atop a two-level parking garage, largely hidden from public view. The plaza has an irregular and complex design, due to the irregular street pattern. The plaza was originally designed with swirling terraced levels, which were not constructed.

Original plans called for a three-level plaza, sloping 2.5 feet, which would converge on curved stairs. The concrete plaza would be striated, in three different textures from rough to smooth.The plaza, together with the planned tower, was to resemble in shape, size, and feeling, the piazzas del Campo and San Marco in Italy. The plaza was to be decorated in a similar festive way, with benches, sculptures, and plantings, together with the flags of the 50 US states around the perimeter. The buildings surrounding the plaza were to all be stepped-back, allowing in more light and becoming suggestive of an amphitheater with rows of seats. The plaza itself would be a concave shape, complementing the convex shape of nearby Beacon Hill. Its design as an enclosed, well-defined area was made in reaction to Boston City Hall Plaza and other designs by Modernist architects.

== Architecture ==
=== Design ===
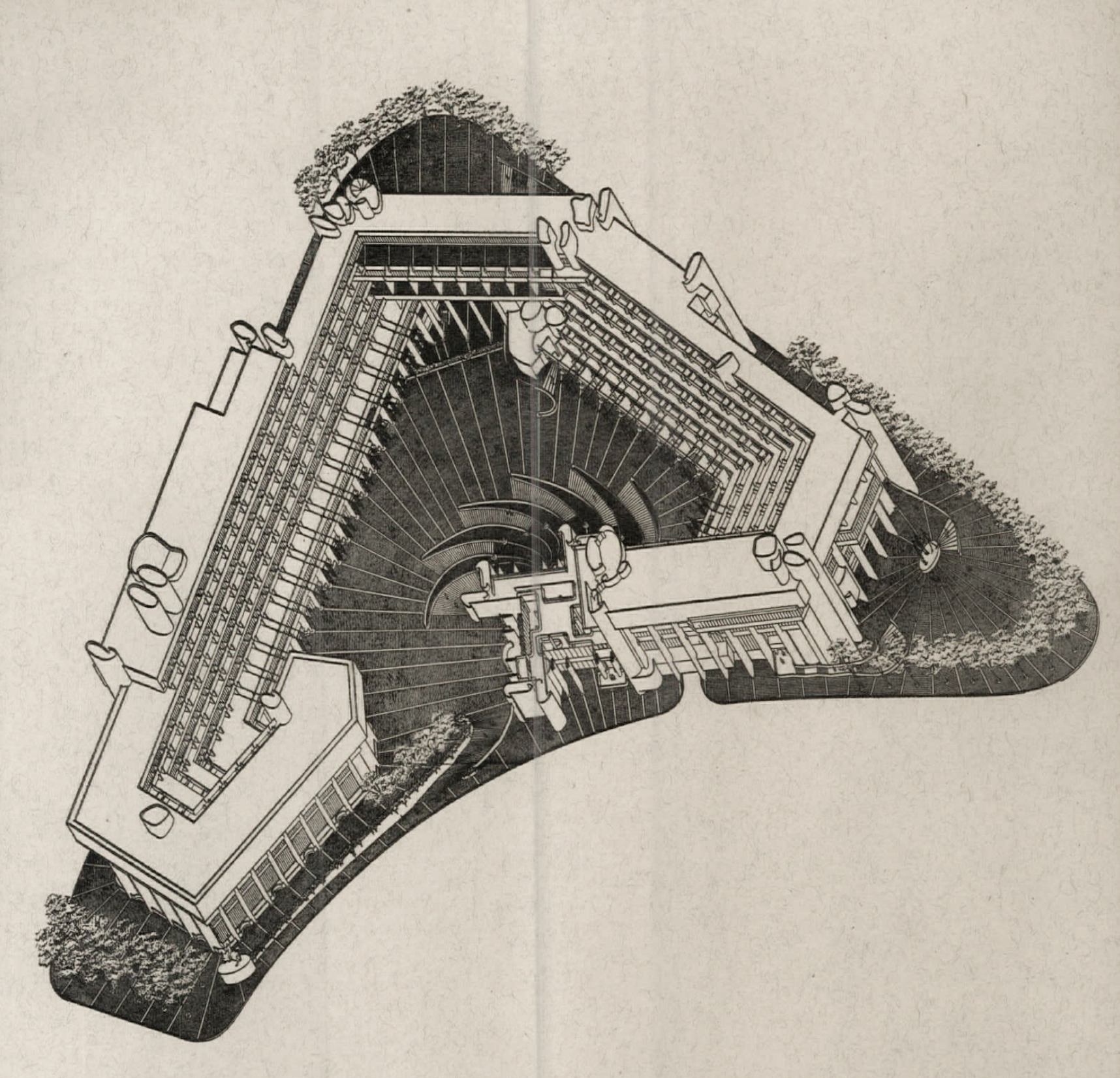
Original site plan, including horizontal cross section of the Health, Welfare and Education tower

Paul Rudolph was the coordinating architect on the project, and also designed the plaza, garage, and landscaping. Rudolph was a practicing architect at the time, as well as chair of the Yale School of Architecture. Desmond & Lord designed the Lindemann Building with Rudolph, and Shepley Bulfinch Richardson and Abbott designed the Hurley Building. Although Rudolph is primarily listed as the coordinator for the project, the design's strength and consistency across the site, as well as its aesthetic, are all suggestive of Rudolph being the most prominent architect for the entire project.

The structure was designed in contrast to the City Hall a few blocks away, and was inspired by the idea of an amphitheater that would allow citizens to experience civic dramas unfolding. Rudolph viewed the grandiose and monumental quality of the structure as appropriate to the aims of the Great Society. Architectural writers have attributed the buildings to the concept of big government, showing that the state has made a large investment in its residents.

Rudolph designed the complex in the style today known as Brutalism, though Rudolph never used the term. He chose this form in opposition to the era's typical glass-walled International style office buildings, which he considered dull and monotonous. The state service center's concrete walls were solid and monumental, and recalled brick masonry.

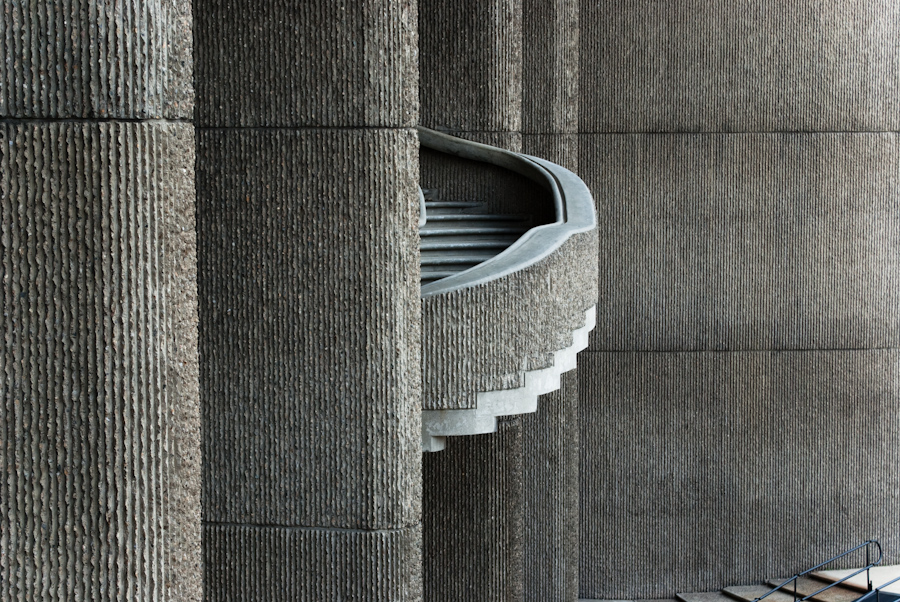
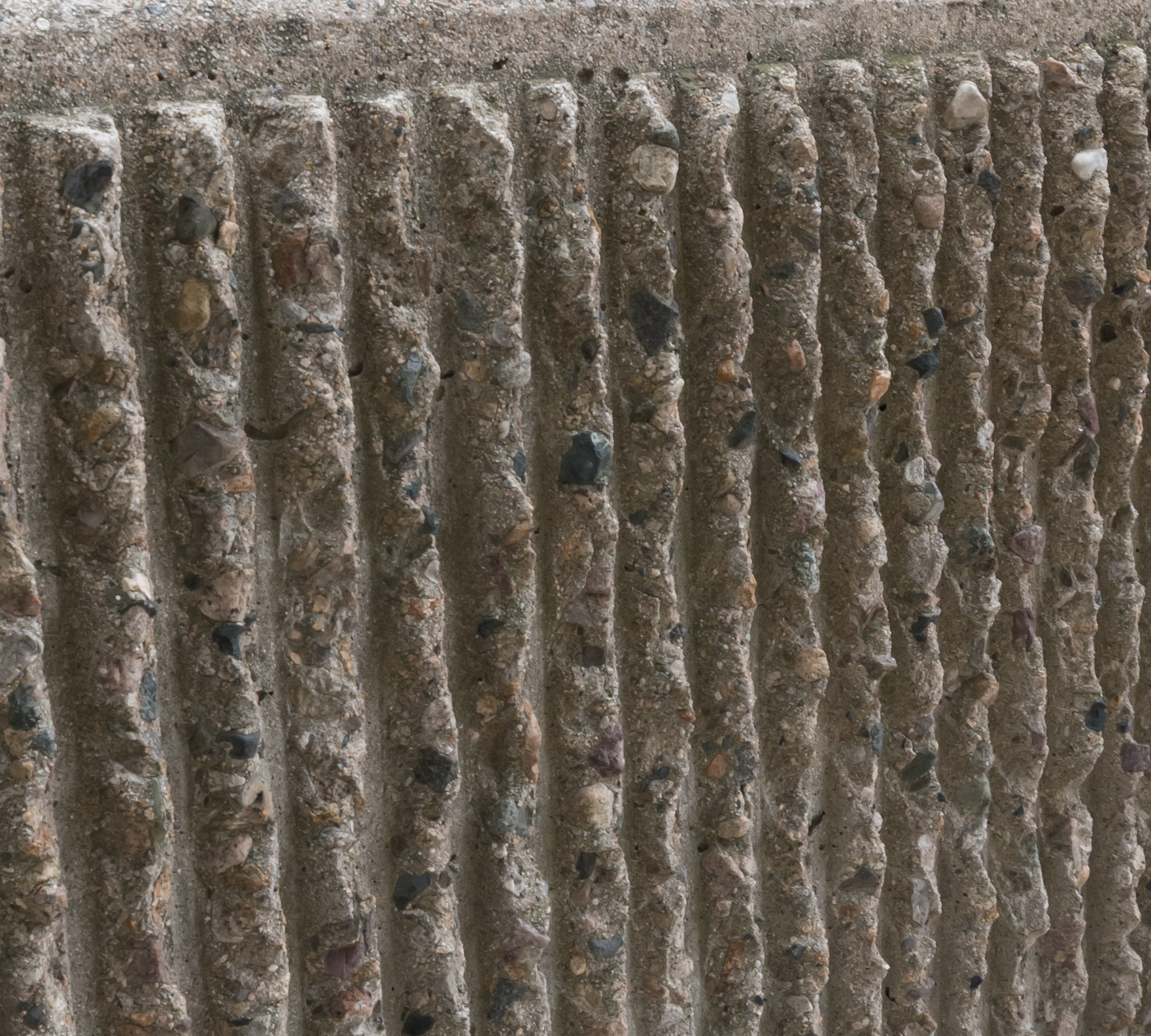
Textured concrete on the building's exterior, made with crushed stone

The interior and exterior of the building utilize ribbed, bush-hammered concrete (also known as "corduroy concrete"), a form Rudolph developed in his earlier Yale Art and Architecture Building. The exposed concrete uses a special aggregate designed to catch light and shadow. The concrete style is one of the building's key defining features. Other representative elements include its several-story-high columns, placed regularly, which contain elevators, staircases, and bathrooms; and the buildings' stepped terraces and concrete sunshades surrounding the central plaza. The exteriors also make use of monumental colonnades and a "cornice" spanning the length of the buildings, one entire story in height. Several of the building's large projecting elements appear biomorphic, including one described as looking like the face of a frog. Interior spaces considered iconic for the building include its chapel and spiral staircase.

The building borrows elements of rectilinearity from the Yale design with dramatic curved shapes similar to those of his Endo Laboratories building in Garden City, New York. Most of the curves are present in the Lindemann section.

The building's proposed Health, Welfare and Education tower was to have 23 stories and house its namesake three state government departments. The tower was to have a public restaurant at the plaza level, encouraging the plaza's public use. It was originally designed by Rudolph and M.A. Dyer, though it was later redesigned, with its floor area doubled to 870,000 sq ft (81,000 m^{2}) and a new height of 33 stories, by Shepley Bullfinch Richardson and Abbot. In 1994, with the site still vacant, the state government designated the site for its new municipal court. The Edward W. Brooke Courthouse was completed there in 1998.

=== Art ===
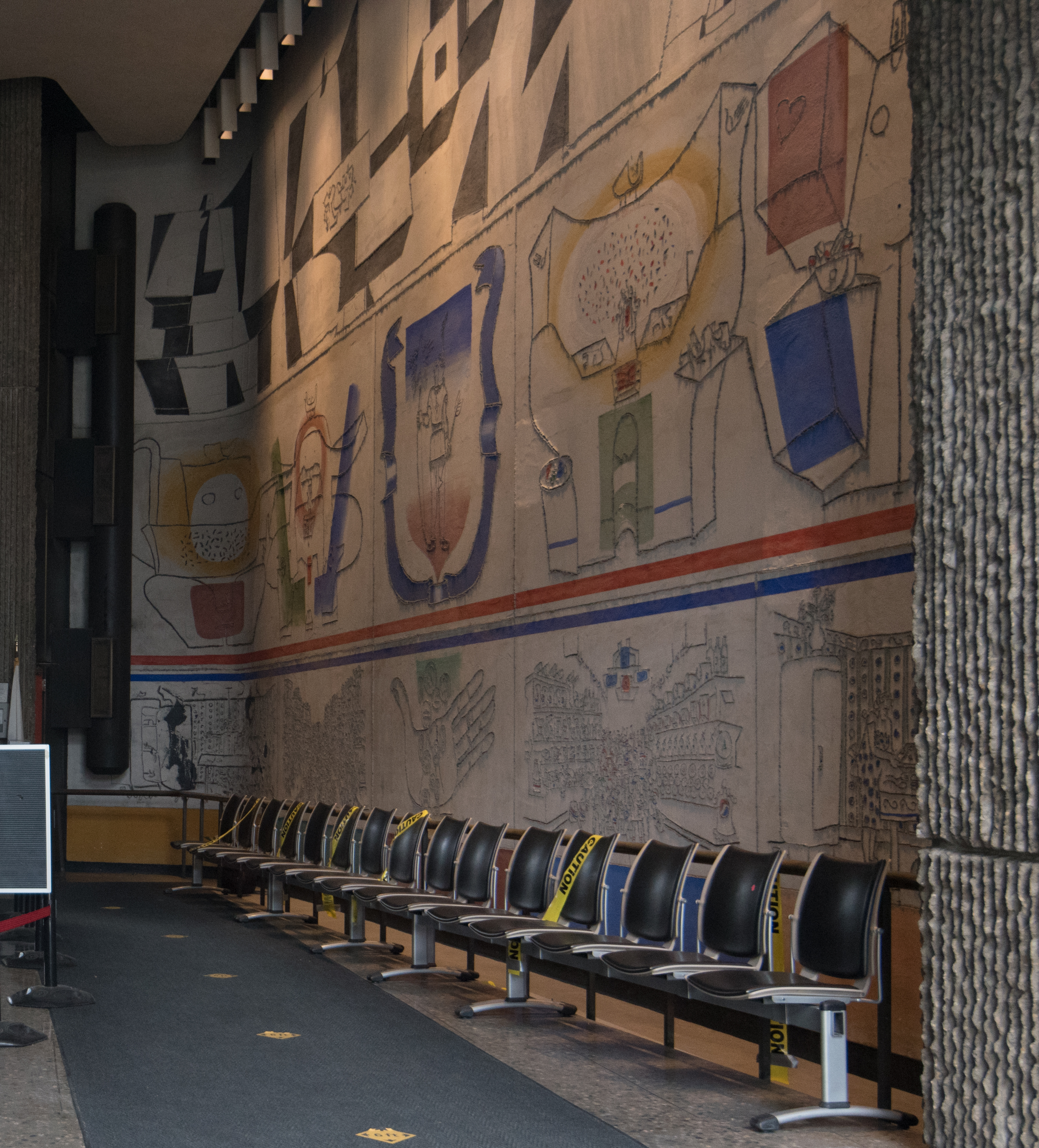
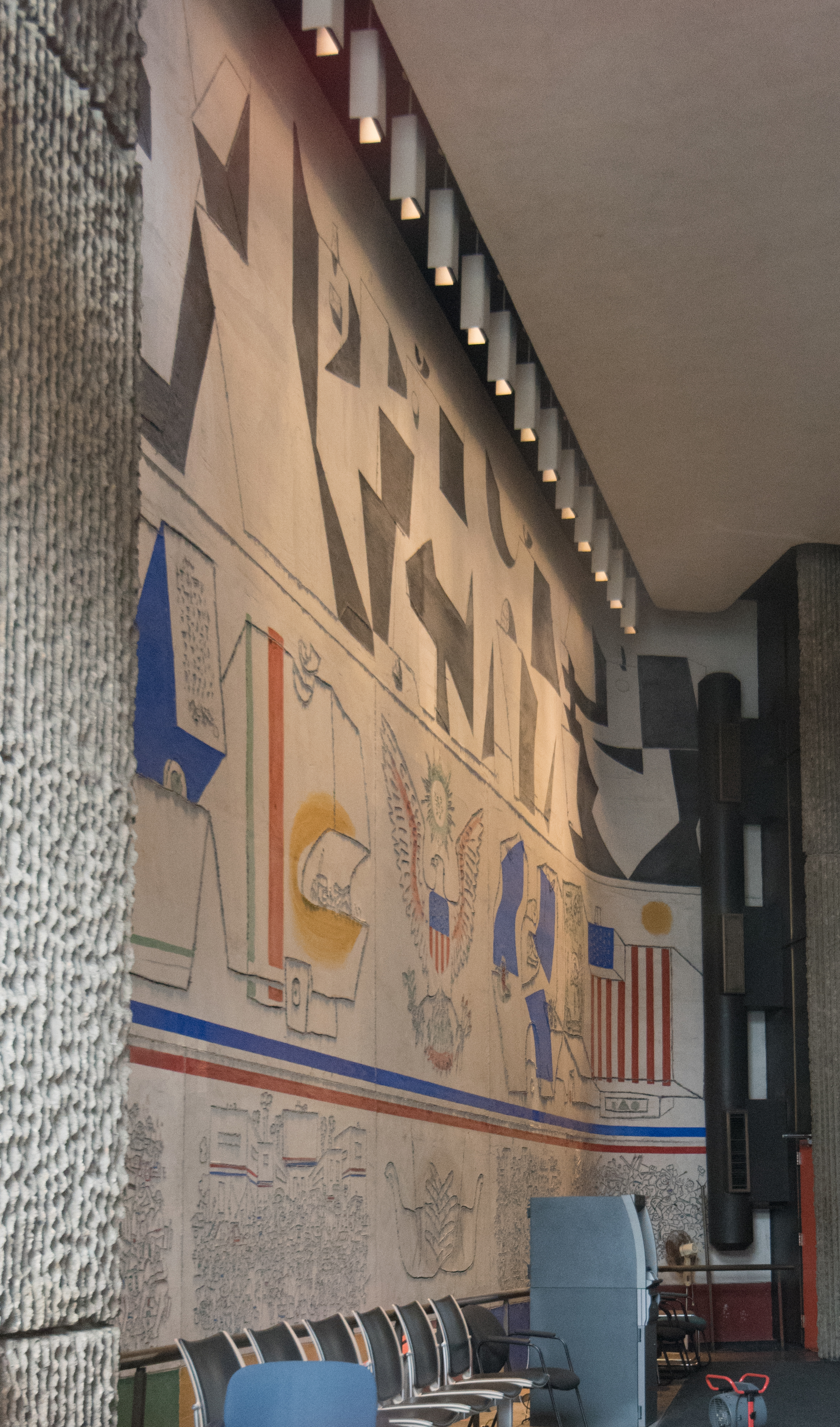
Costantino Nivola murals

The Hurley building's lobby features two large murals by Italian artist Costantino Nivola. They face each other in the lobby; one is themed for unemployment insurance and its benefits to families and society; the other is on employment service, and how vocational training benefits workers and the economy. The works utilize the fresco sgraffito process; Nivola's largest work with this technique, taking up the height and length of multi-story walls. They provide a humanizing and colorful contrast to the surrounding architecture, with their bright primary colors and anthropomorphic figures. The works give subtle critiques of 20th century economic and social structures. The Nivola murals are important as some of his few remaining works; numerous have been demolished or walled over. The works are threatened by planned renovation of the Hurley Building.

Another work, Upward Bound, is suspended from the ceiling of the Hurley Building's east portico, facing New Chardon St. and the central courtyard. The 30-ft.-wide, 17-ft.-tall sculpture, by Charles Fayette Taylor Sr., was created in 1970 and installed for the building's opening. It is made using cylindrical brass poles welded together and supported by steel struts and cables. The work has an upward movement, symbolizing the benefit of the unemployment office housed there – to support the public with economic and work opportunities.

=== Lindemann Building ===
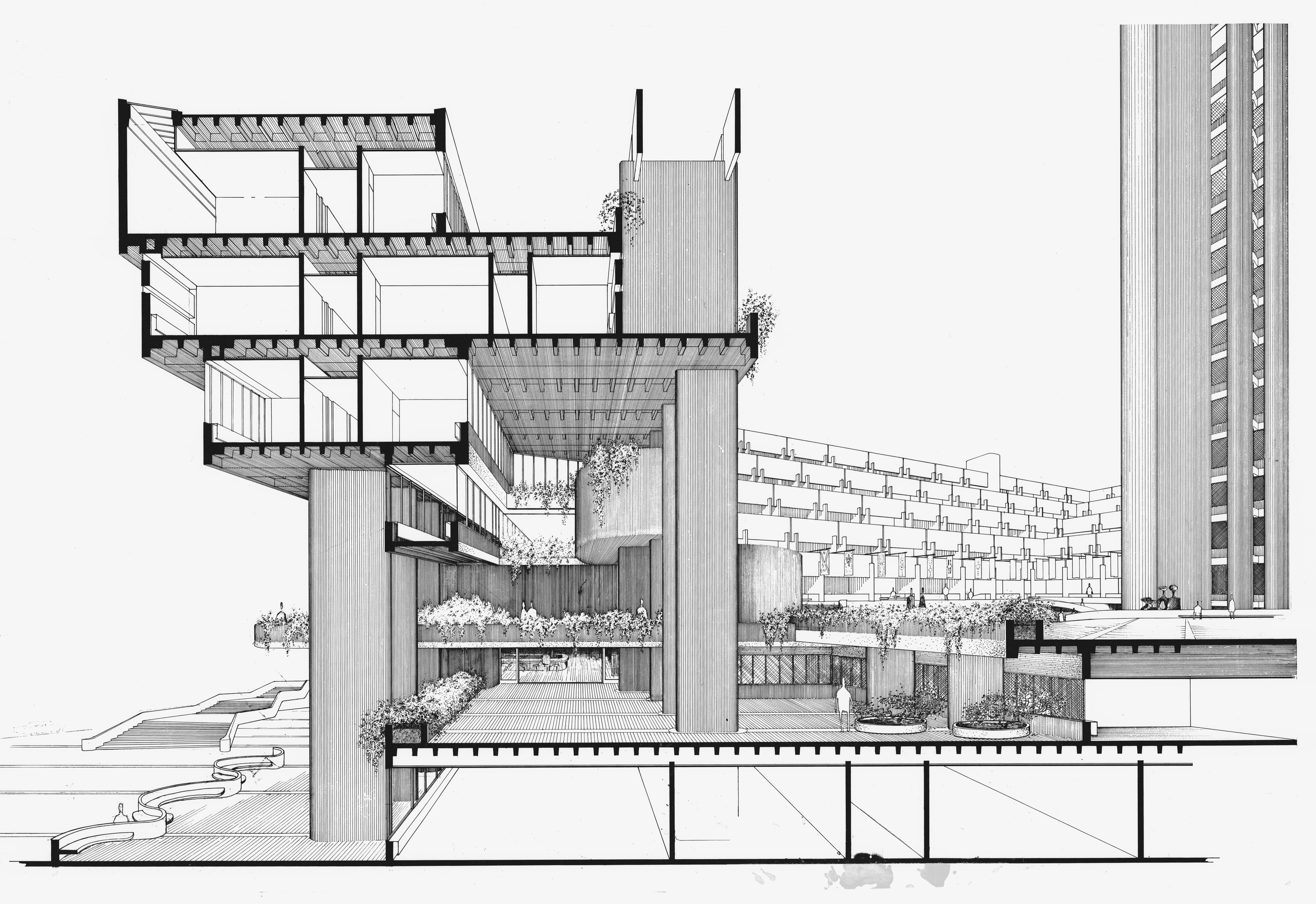
Cross-section plan for the Lindemann Building, c. 1963

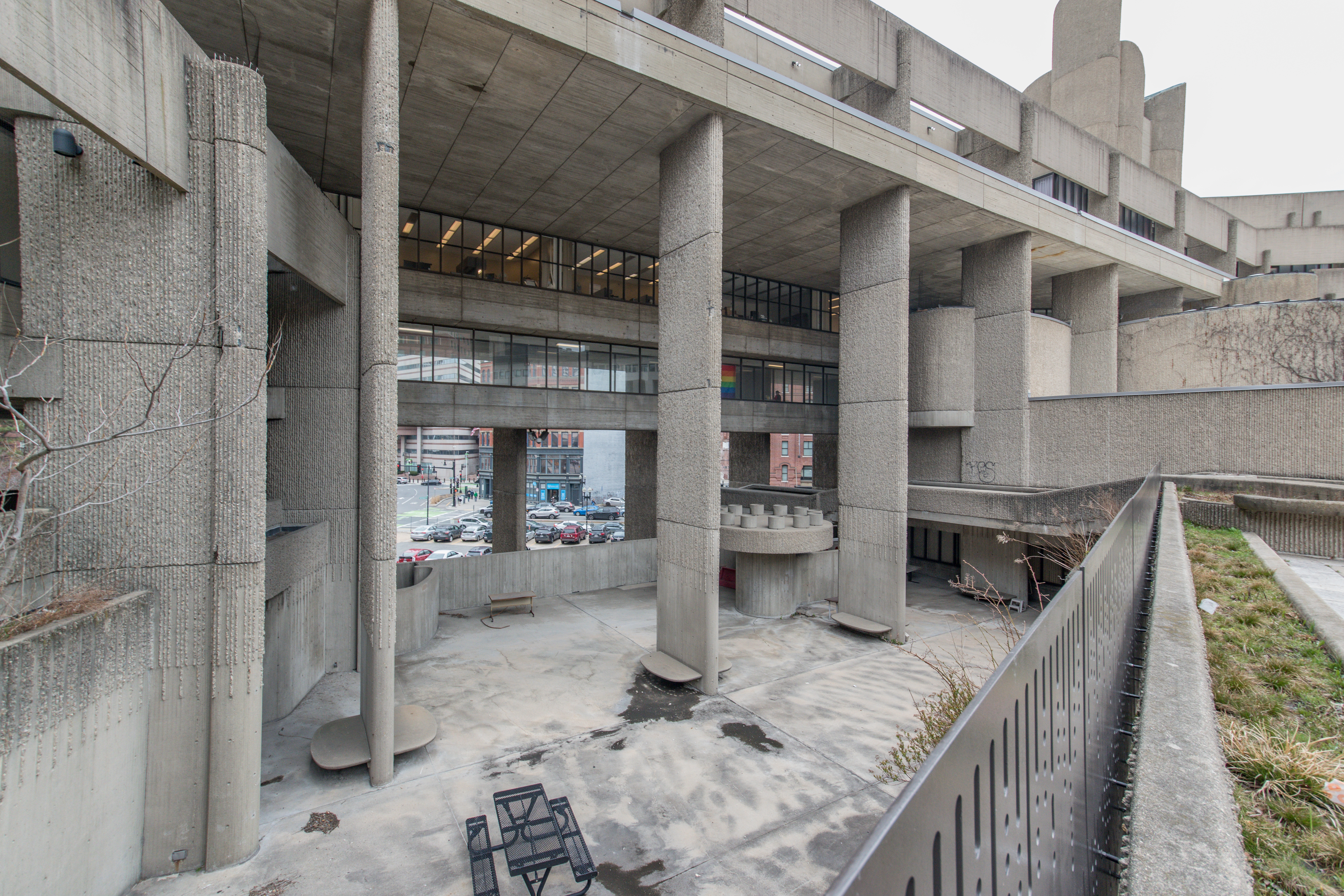
Lindemann Building lower courtyard

The 221,900 sq ft (20,620 m^{2}) Lindemann Building houses the Erich Lindemann Mental Health Center (ELMHC), a psychiatric facility. Registered as a hospital, the facility accepted inpatients until December 2008, when these patients were moved to another facility. During the center's early years, it had a staff of 150 personnel, including 12 psychiatrists, 9 psychologists, 12 social workers, 24 nurses, and numerous support staff members. The mental health center incorporated numerous activity spaces, including a nursery and spaces for family, group, individual, and occupational therapies. Occupational therapy spaces included shops for electrical, plumbing, and woodwork, as well as a cafe, theater, and model apartment, to let patients develop skills for society in training. An area for children included bedrooms, a dining hall, and outdoor play area. A large gymnasium and 625 sq ft (58.1 m^{2}) swimming pool were built on the first floor, and at one time were open to the public and used by up to 41 community groups.

The Lindemann building also features a small chapel set in its center, set on the top two floors. It has a single large skylight, a large concrete altar, a seating area and balcony, and curved walls of cast concrete. The space was originally open for patients, staff, and visitors, when the surrounding space was used for inpatients. The room has kneelers for Christians, a small alcove potentially for confessions, and an alcove for changing clothes and preparing for services. When the inpatient services were moved out of the building in 2009, the chapel was locked, only occasionally used for services and small patient and staff gatherings.

=== Hurley Building ===
The Charles F. Hurley Building has 327,022 sq ft (30,381.3 m^{2}). It was named for Hurley due to his service as Massachusetts governor. Since at least 1973, the building has been likened to the state of Massachusetts in shape, with Cape Cod disproportionately larger. Employees would refer to their offices as located in "Harwich" or the "Hyannis area", or mention repairs need to be made in "Worcester". The architects considered this design resemblance a coincidence, with Rudolph stating that "nothing was further from my mind" in designing the building.

Gallery

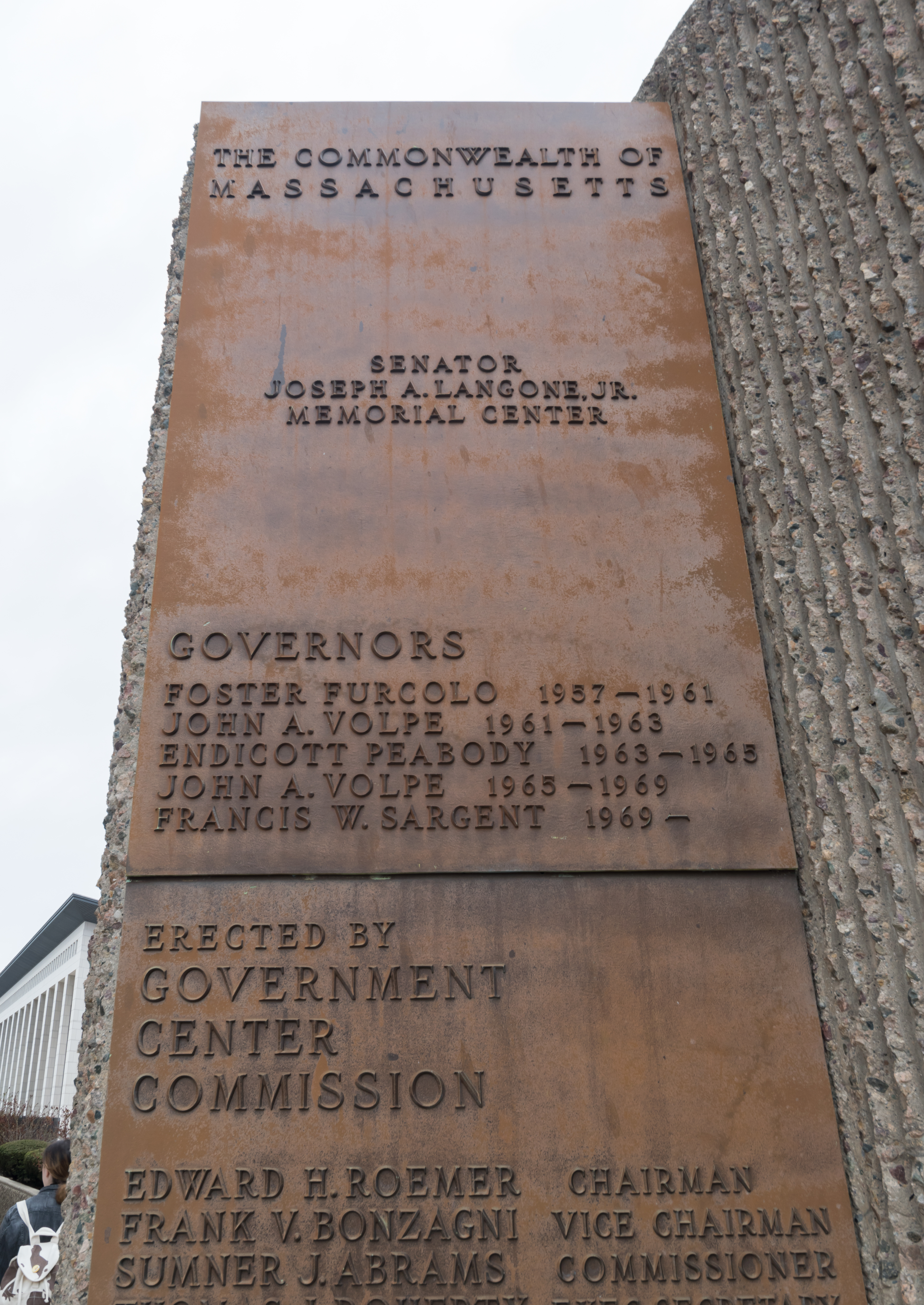
Upper portion of the center's plaque

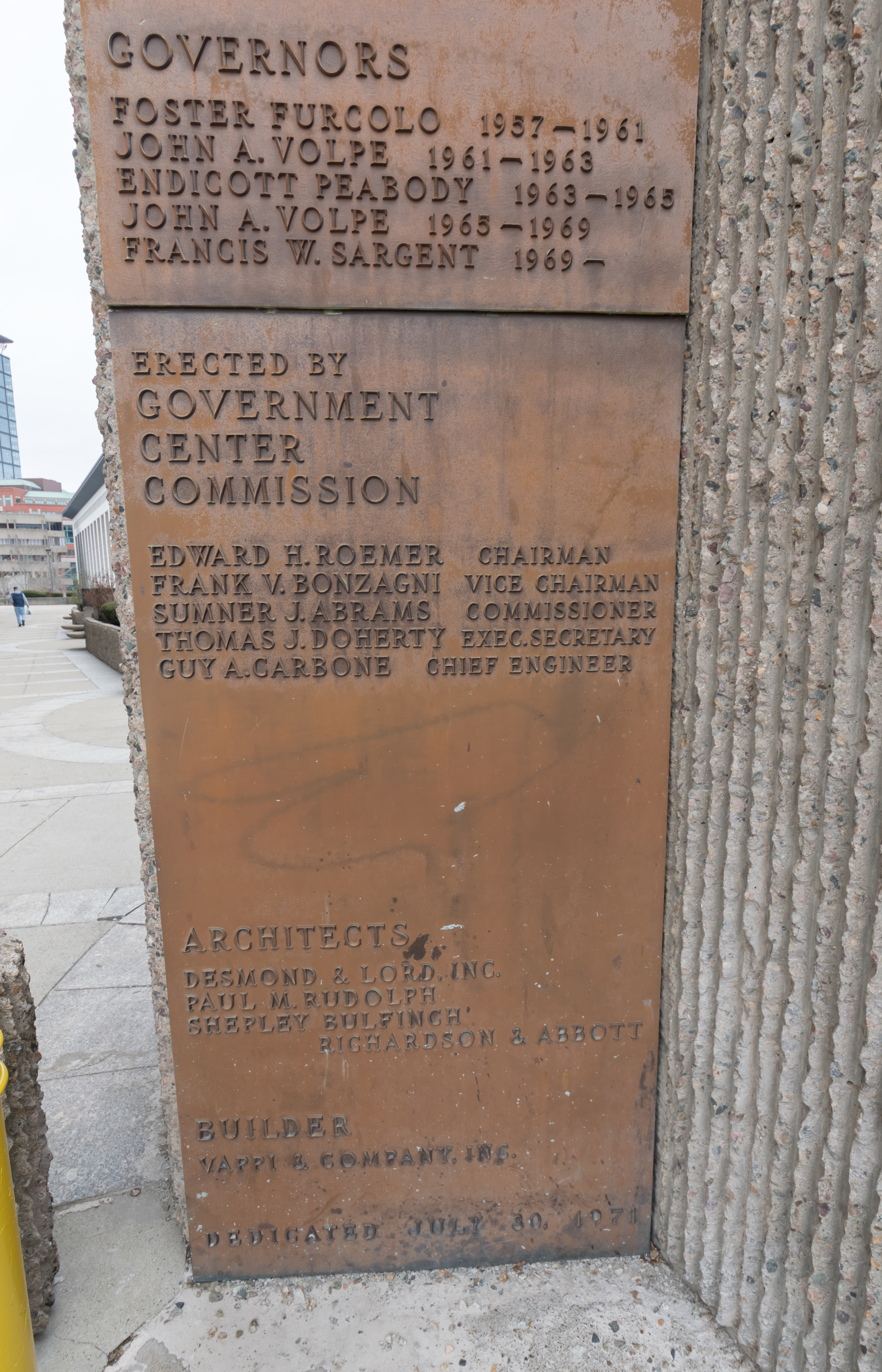
Bottom half of the plaque

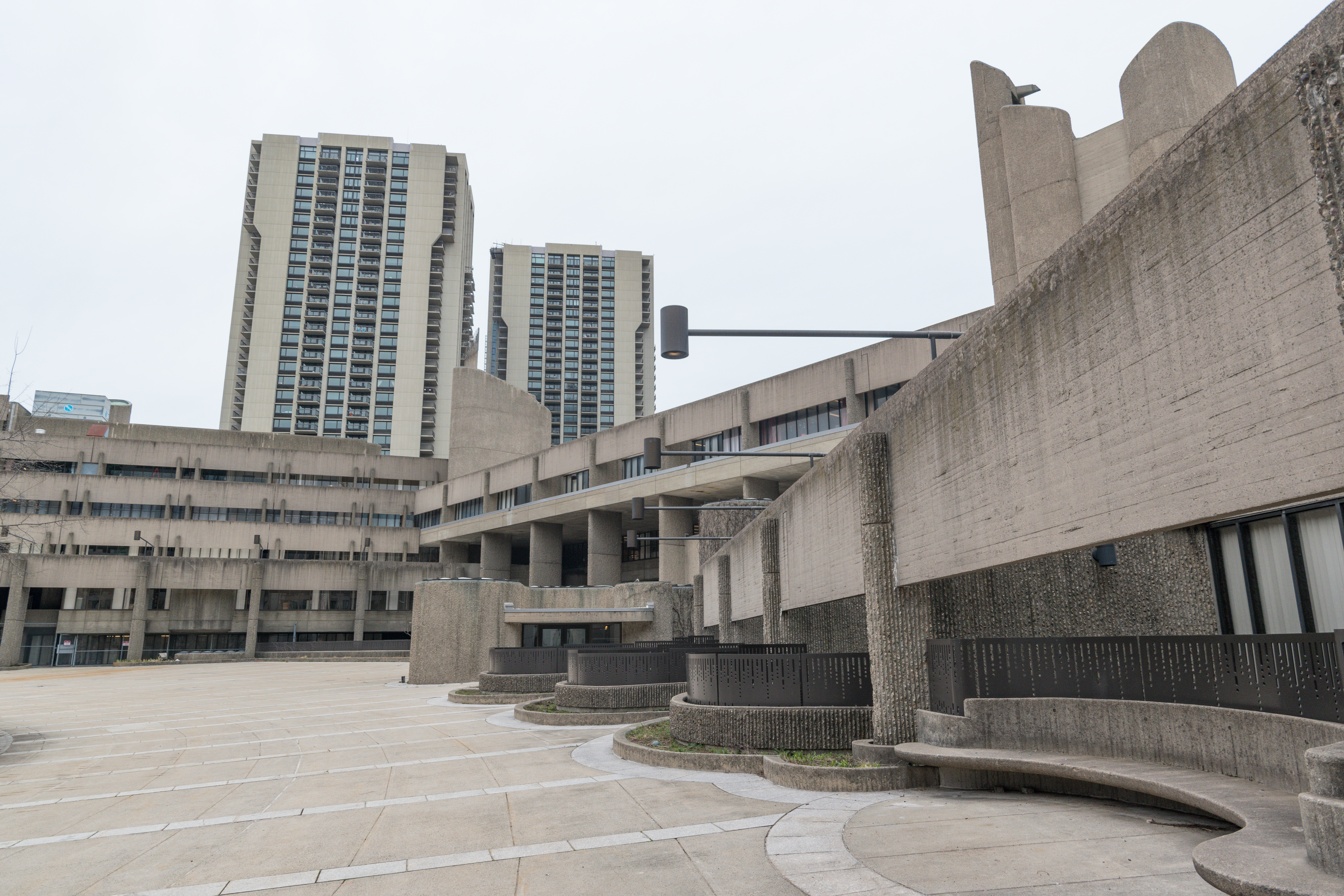
Upper portion of the interior plaza

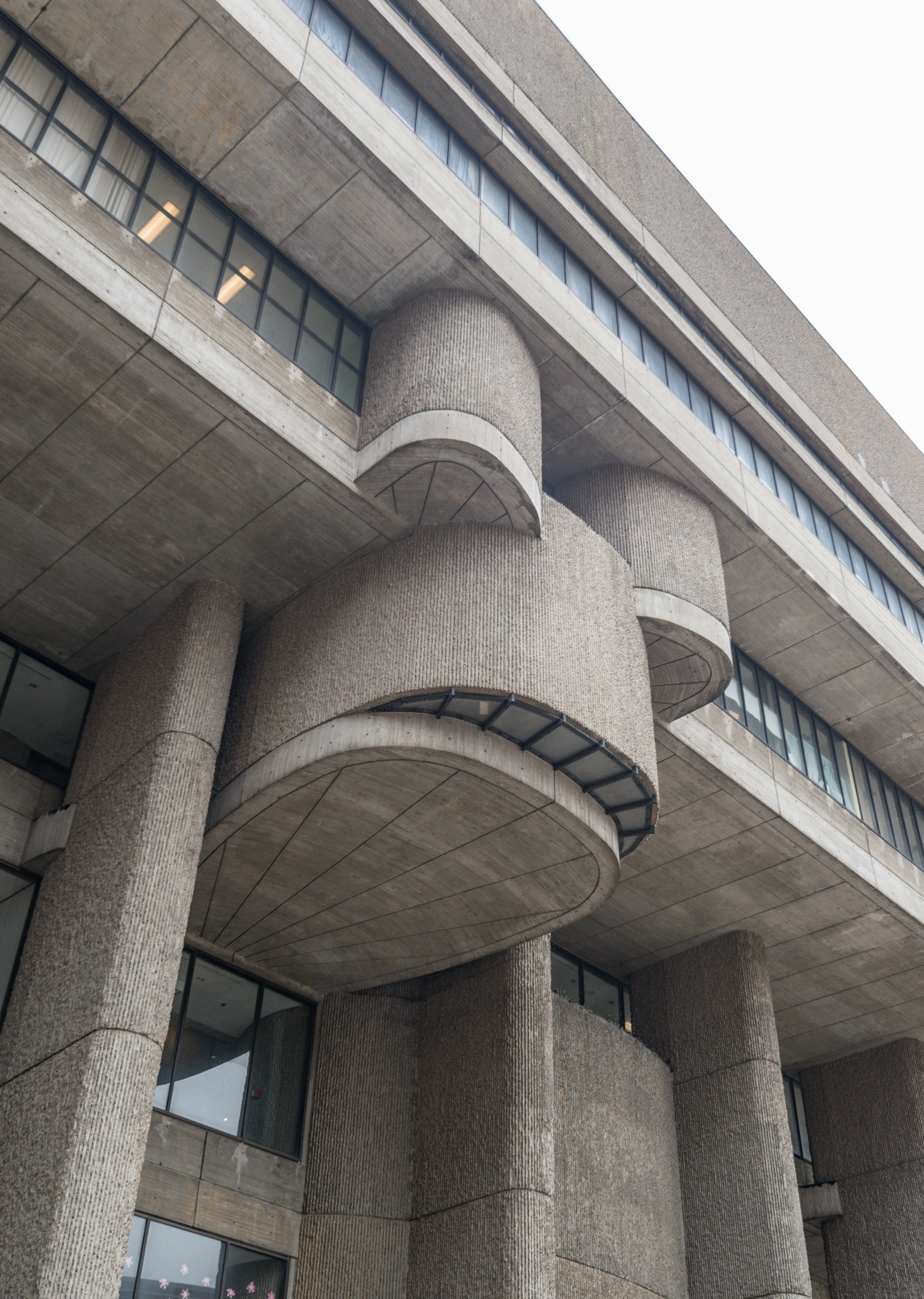
Lindemann Building "frog"

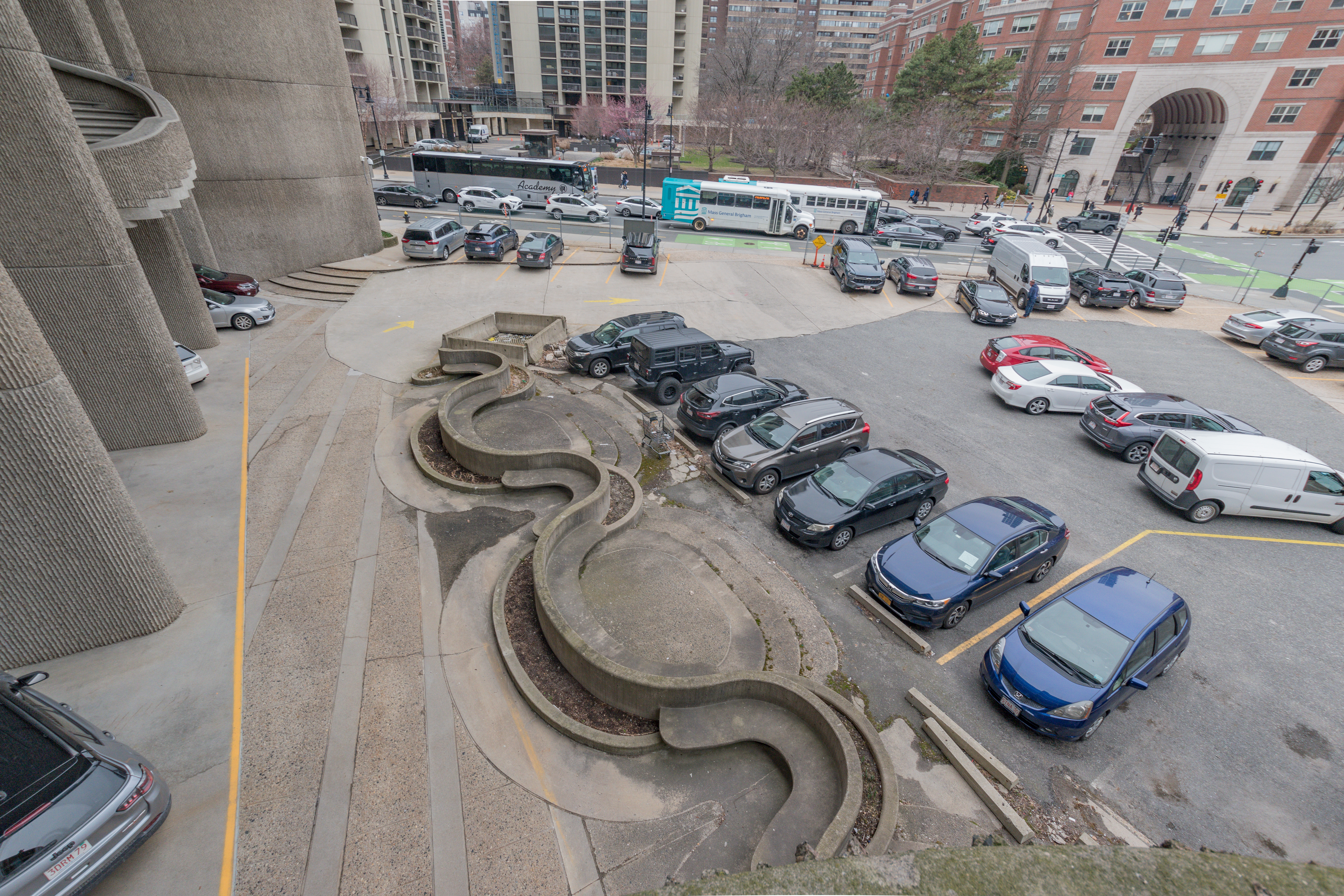
Merrimac Plaza, mostly used for parking

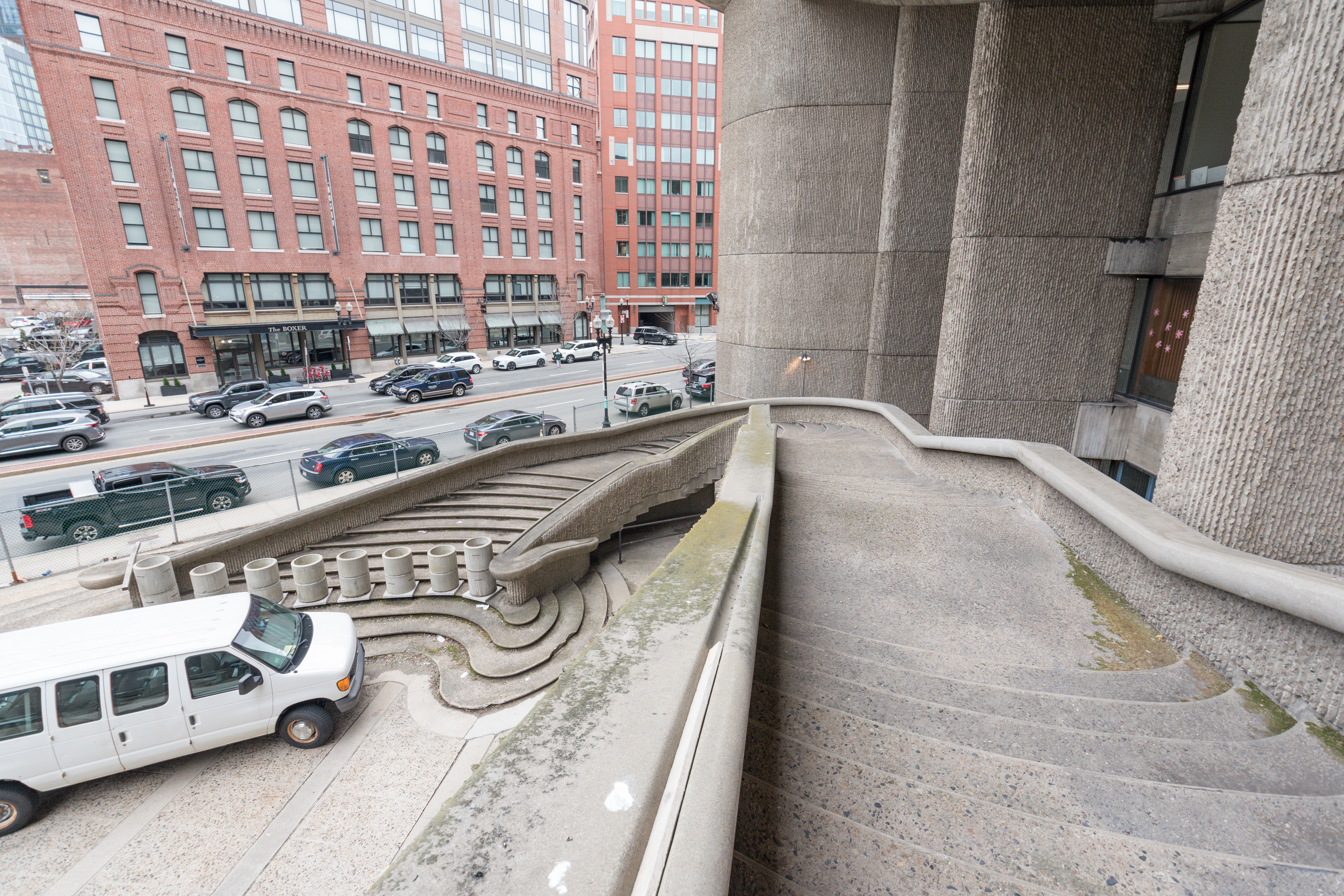
The Lindemann's main exterior stairwell

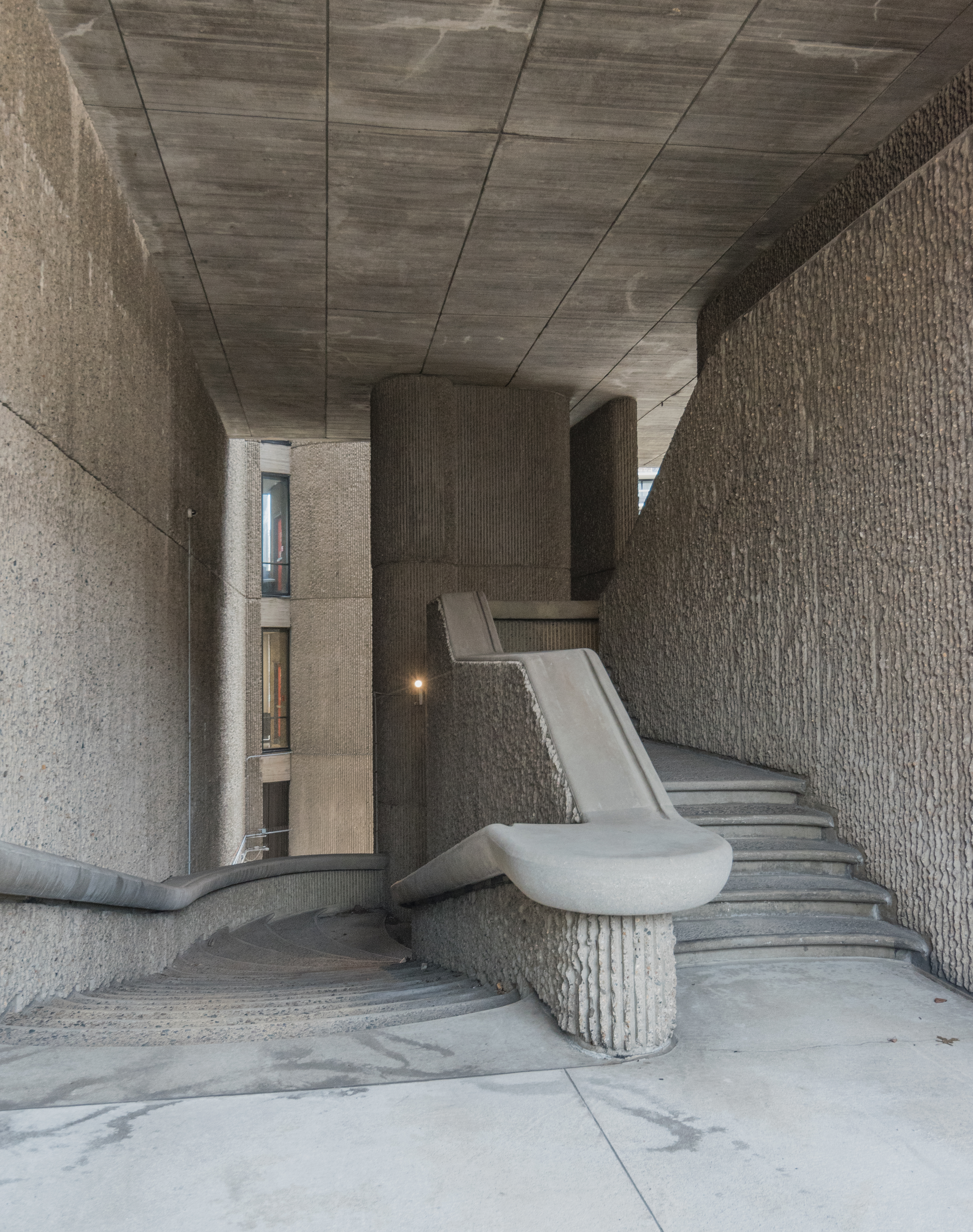
Upper portion of the stairwell

== History ==
=== Site structures and changes ===
Site before urban renewal

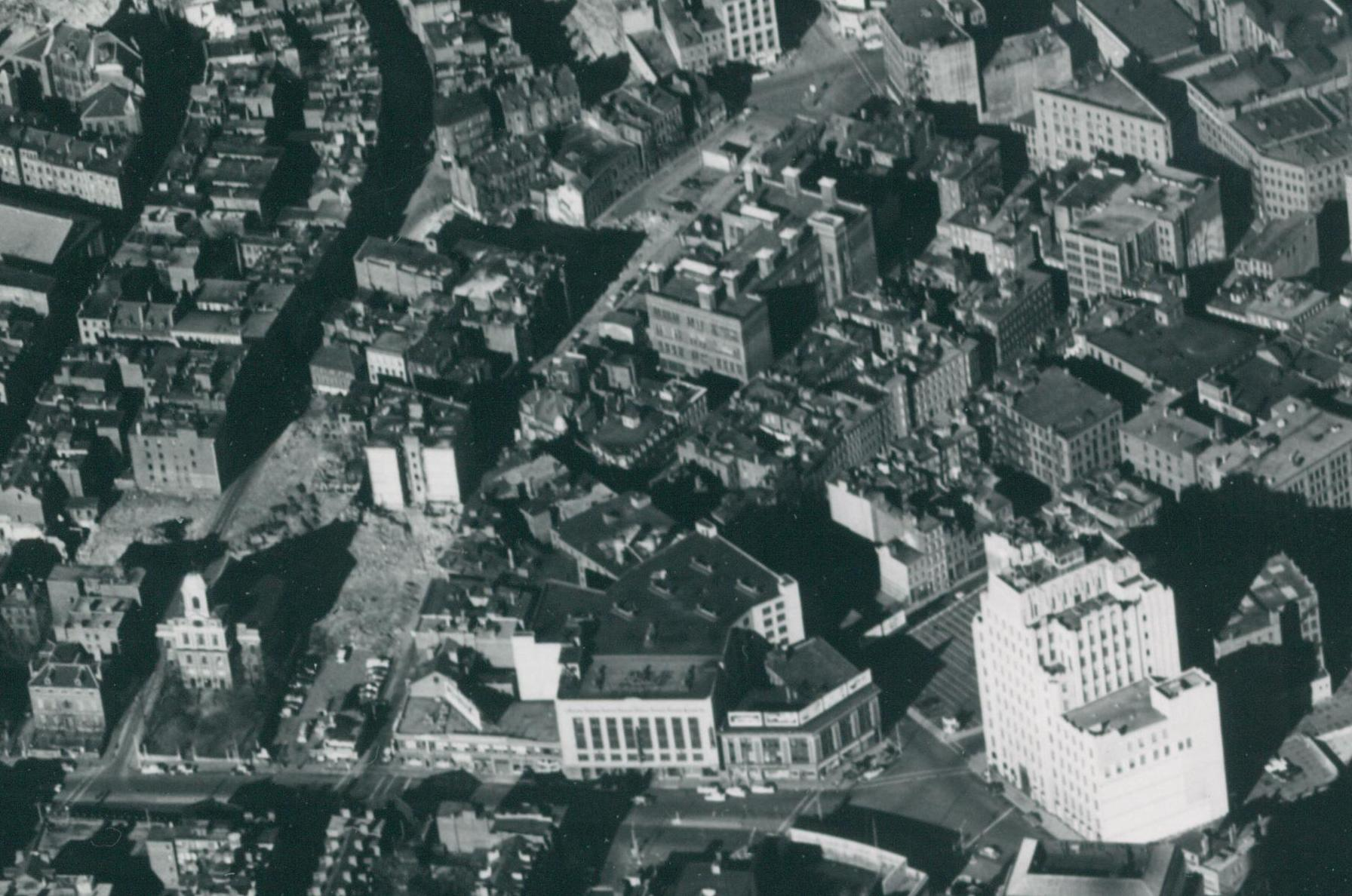
The site in 1961; the neighboring Otis House and Old West Church are at the bottom left. (full image)

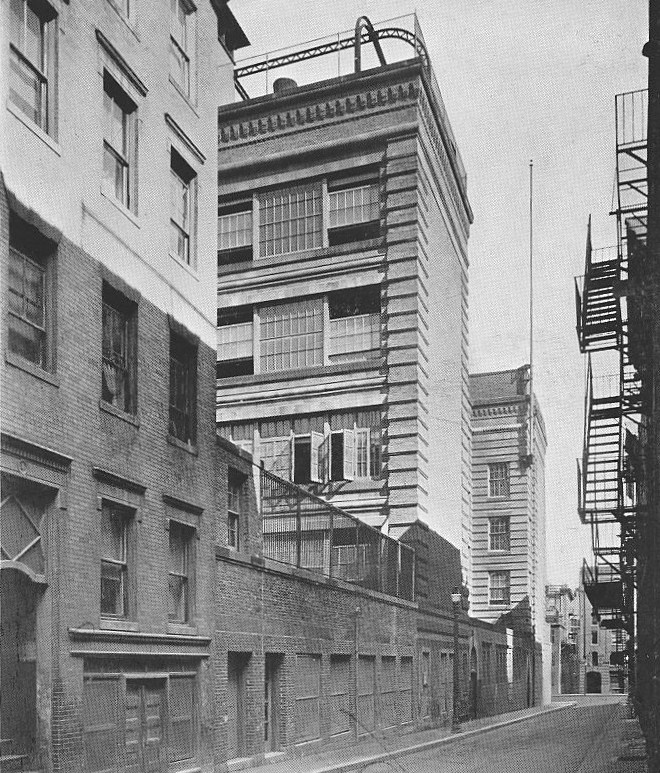
The Washington School, demolished in 1963 for the complex

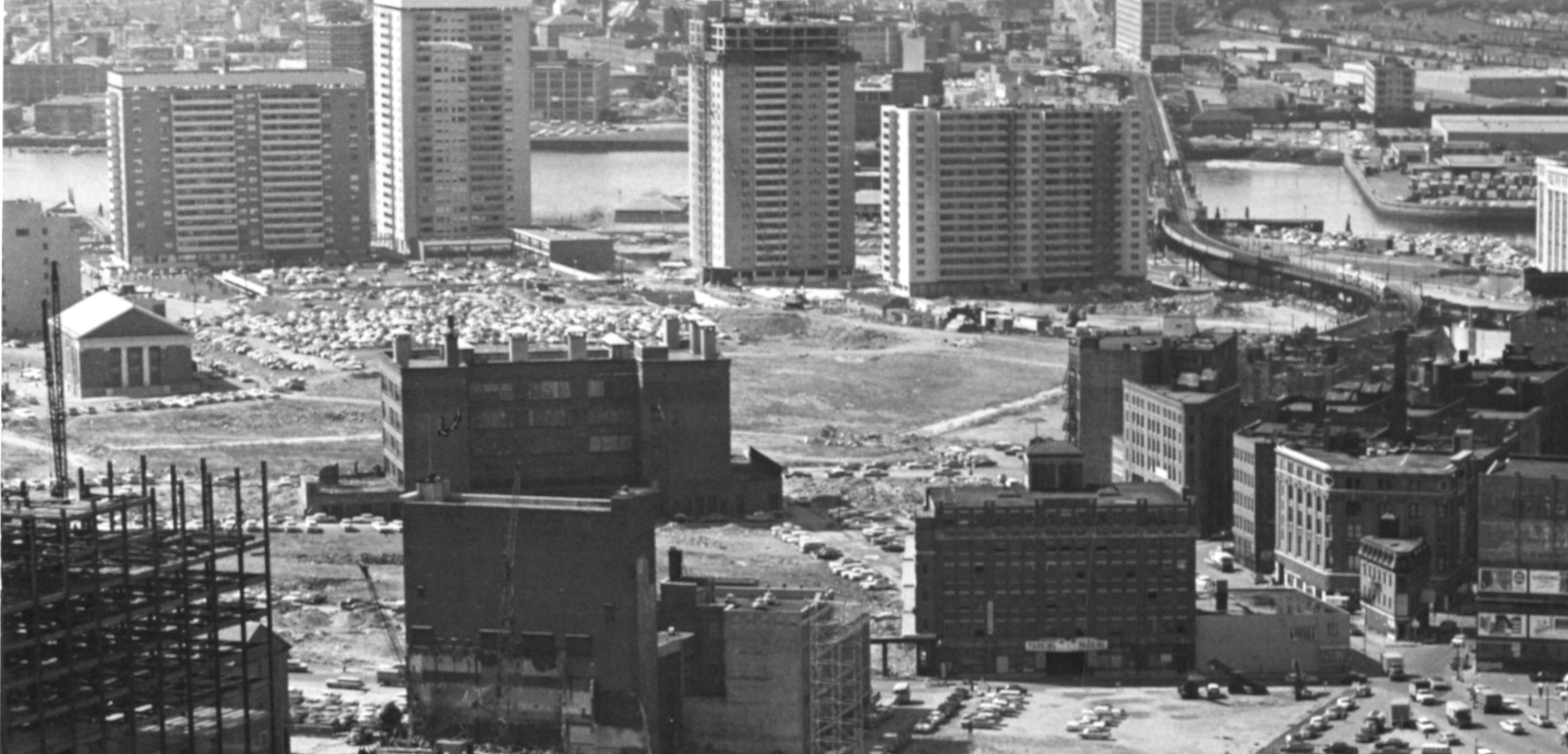
During urban renewal; the Washington School stands in the center of the cleared site

The site of the Boston Government Service Center was by Bowdoin Square, an area that changed from residential to commercial, as the city grew and as land was reclaimed. Commercial shipping companies made use of much of the present-day Government Center land until more land was reclaimed, and then restaurants and hotels were built at the site. The area went into a slow and steady decline in the late 19th century to mid-20th century, due to its proximity to the Boston Navy Yard, and business moving south and to Back Bay. The Government Center area lost its expensive theaters, restaurants, and hotels, changing to house tattoo parlors, variety theaters, and penny arcades. By 1917, the city's planning board proposed a civic center there due to its good location, poor state of buildings, and low property values.

Little action took place from 1930, when the site was chosen for a civic center, through to 1949, when it was classified as an urban renewal area. The Housing Act of 1949 made site clearance possible. The site had 91 percent of structures substandard, and with a majority "vermin-infested", and with exposed wiring, obsolete and insufficient plumbing, and other issues. With widespread public support, the city seized and demolished large portions of the West End in the 1960s, displacing a significant portion of the city's working-class families. A master plan for the 60-acre (24 ha) site, Government Center, was devised by architects I. M. Pei and Henry N. Cobb.

Houses were cleared for the center site. Some of the displaced residents still live in the West End, as of 2022. The Washington School, a public school, also stood on the site, completed in 1904 and renovated to house the Department of School Buildings in 1935. The school was demolished in 1963 during the urban renewal process.

=== Construction and operation ===
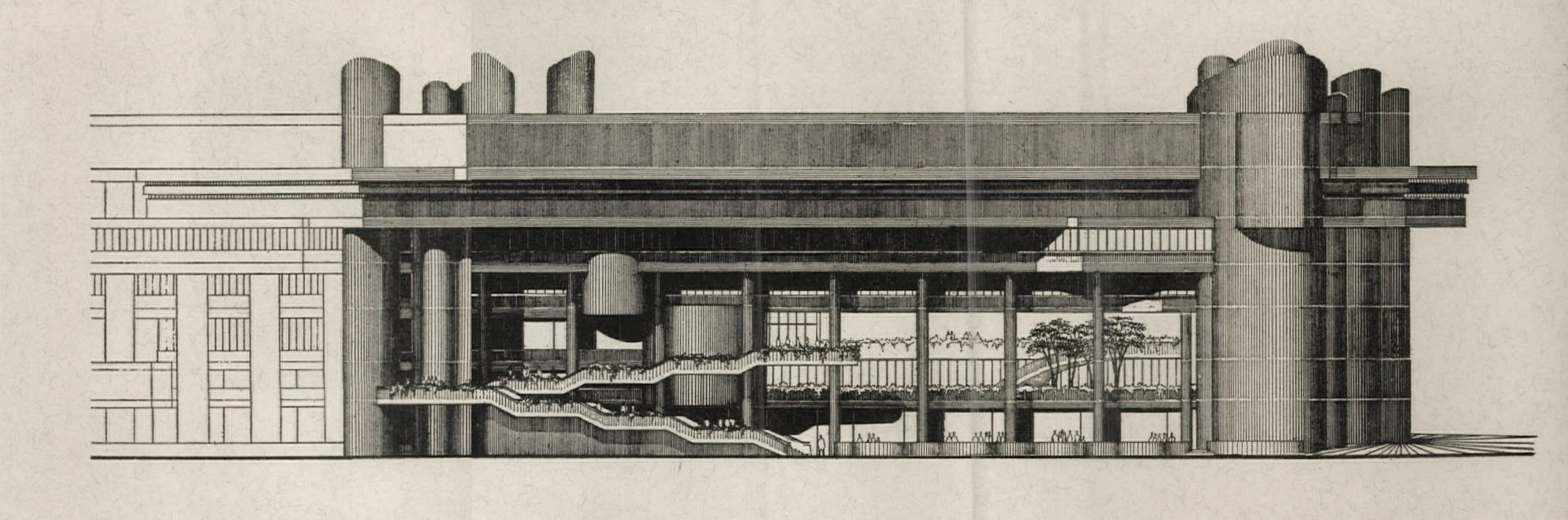
Architect's sketch for the Lindemann, 1964

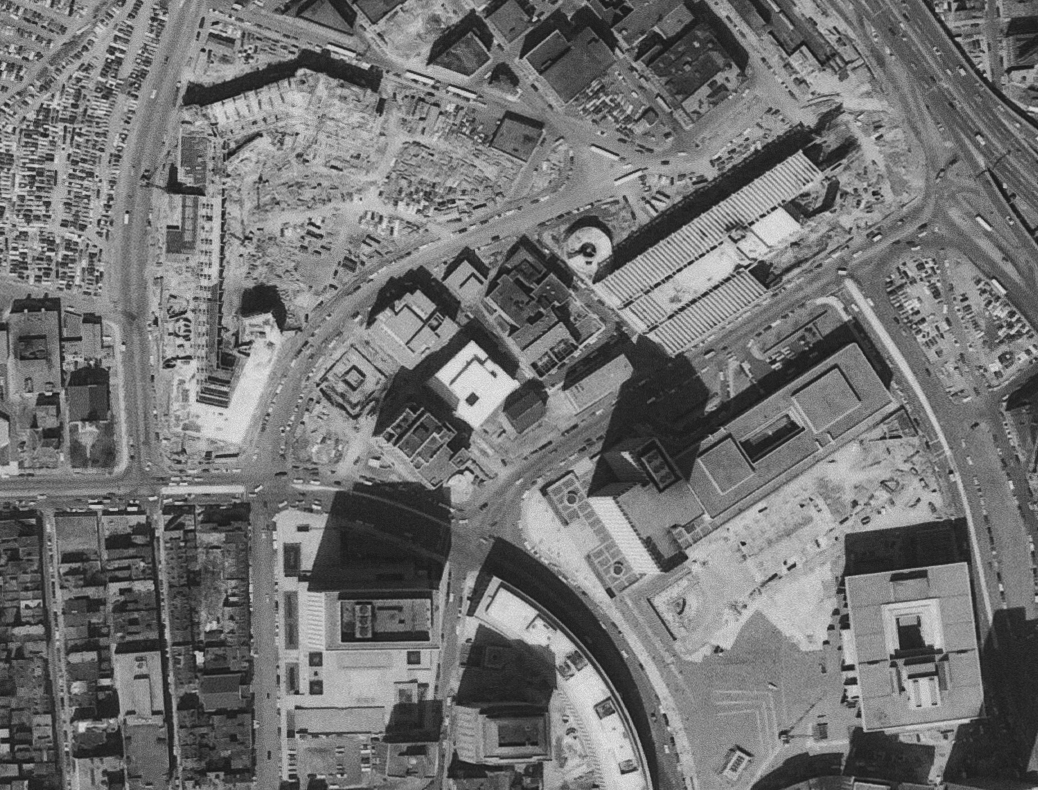
Construction of the center (upper left) in 1969; City Hall is at lower right

The design process began in 1962. Cost estimates in 1964 included $19.7 million for the Hurley building, $7.1 million for the Lindemann building, and $12.2 million for the Health, Welfare and Education tower.

The master plan for the Government Center called for three separate buildings on the site, designed by three separate firms. With an unusual site plan, the firms designed plans for all three buildings with the hope of cooperation among them, though none of the plans satisfied all, or satisfied the Boston Redevelopment Authority (BRA). Shortly after the Boston City Hall design was unveiled, Paul Rudolph designed a plan for the Government Service Center site which was backed by a member of Shepley Bulfinch Richardson and Abbott and passed the BRA's approval process. The firms then agreed to design the buildings within Rudolph's scheme, with Rudolph as the coordinating architect.

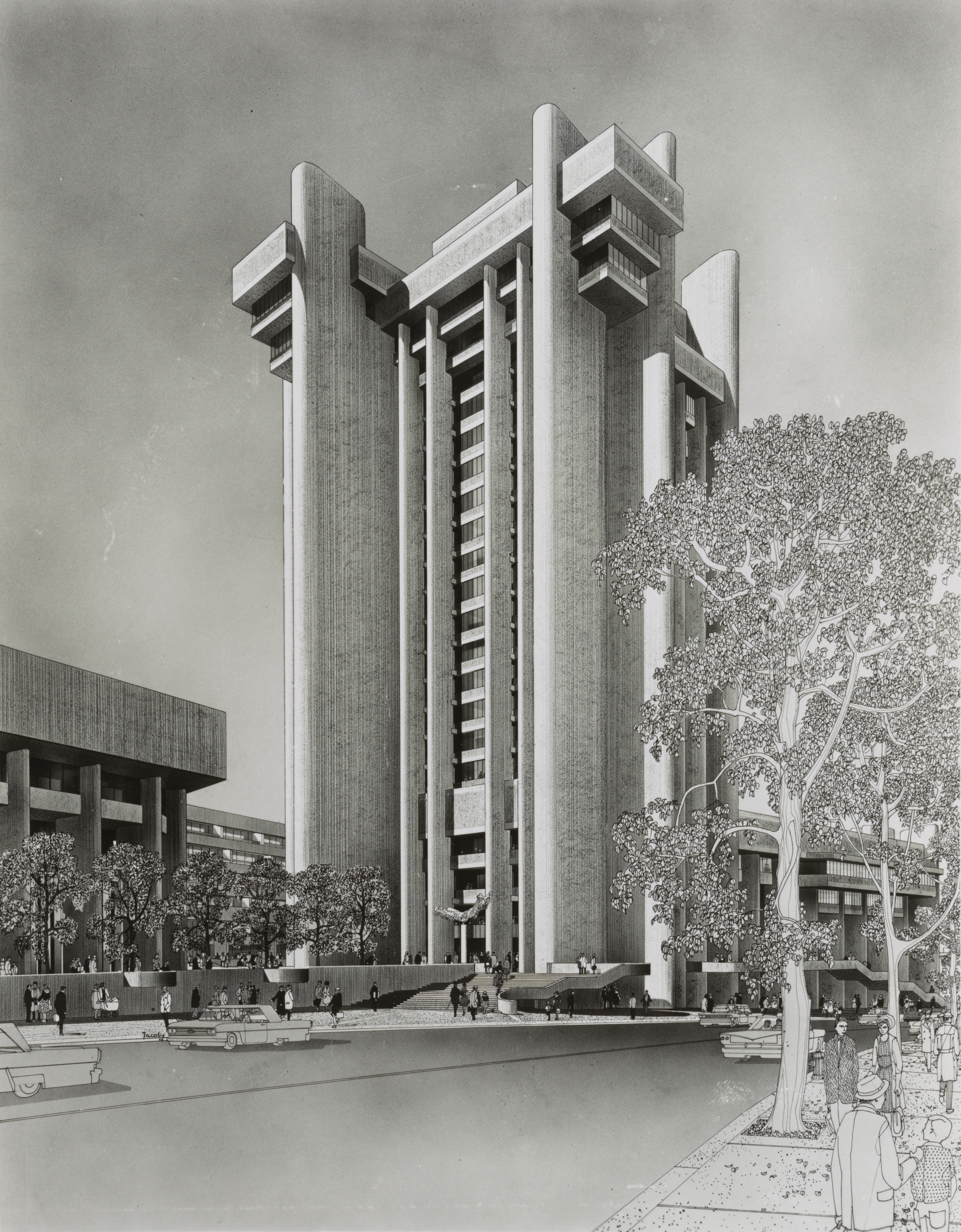
Unbuilt tower

Construction began in 1966 and lasted into 1971. Most of the complex was completed in that year, including most of the serpentine structure, interior courtyard, and plaza. Funding cuts in 1970 led to the cancellation of the tower and swirling terraces at its base. An economic recession, as well as the Vietnam war and political assassinations had affected desires to complete such large-scale government projects. William Grindereng, who worked for Rudolph on the project, said that the Government Center Commission put out bids on the project piece-by-piece, contrary to Rudolph's wishes. The Lindemann and Hurley buildings were approved over the original budget, awarded to Vappi Construction Co. No other companies bid against Vappi for the tower commission, and Vappi's offer was substantially over the budget, so the tower was never built.

In 1999 the remaining space (long fenced-in and overgrown with weeds) was filled with the Edward W. Brooke Courthouse, by Kallmann McKinnell & Wood, in a completely different architectural style. At around the same time the courtyard was landscaped with an elliptical planting, and features such as stairways, an elevator, and a wheelchair access ramp were added. While the additions match the style of the original buildings, they can be distinguished by the different style of ribbed concrete used, which lacks rough exposed aggregate.

Other than the landscaping in the courtyard, the buildings have never undergone significant restoration or renovation and appear weathered and neglected today. The edges of the sweeping, curved exterior stairways are crumbling, exposing the rebar inside. The exterior plaza on the north side, shown in Rudolph's original drawings as full of benches, trees, and people, is now a parking lot with a chain link fence around it.

The buildings offer many benches and sheltered and concealed spots, which are used by the local homeless population to take refuge from the weather and rest or sleep. In 2008, the state attached signs to the exterior discouraging these uses (and damaging the concrete). Officially, the property is closed to the public on evenings and weekends, but this policy is seldom enforced.

In December 2008, the Erich Lindemann Mental Health Center, a psychiatric facility, moved its inpatients to the Solomon Fuller Mental Health Center. The Lindemann building no longer has resident patients, though it serves outpatients with a site director, director of risk management, two supervisors, and 70 employees, as of 2009. The building also holds the Central Office of the Massachusetts Department of Mental Health.

In 2013, many of the exterior staircases, terraces, and niches were fenced off because the side walls were not tall enough to meet modern safety codes. Several injuries had been reported from falls through open light wells, prompting the fence. A set of curved and perforated steel panels was installed along the edges of the plaza in 2019, and the fencing was removed. The stylized panels were designed by architect Stephen Moore.

The buildings have been degrading for decades, with concrete crumbling and exposed rebar at several locations. The HVAC systems are obsolete, and the buildings are not well insulated.

=== Redevelopment plans ===
External videos
- "Hurley Building Redevelopment" on YouTube, describing the building and proposed changes. Produced by the Commonwealth of Massachusetts, 2020.

Around 2019, the Massachusetts Division of Capital Asset Management and Maintenance (DCAMM) began to address the Hurley Building's urban design challenges. These include: elements at a monumental scale to be complemented with elements at human scale, activating and enhancing public spaces (the Merrimac Street plaza, the central courtyard, sidewalks, and the ground floor of the building), reworking areas with concealed entrances and dark passages, and improving or removing the site's loading docks. The renovations improving these aspects are intended to complement the existing site's form, fenestration, and materials. In addition, the Hurley has one of the highest energy use intensities among commercial buildings in Boston, resulting in large energy costs. Proposed improvements include improving air sealing; window, roof, and wall insulation; green roofs; on-site renewable energy generation; new HVAC&R systems; and improving air, water, and lighting quality. Noted deteriorating elements included stained concrete, trash buildups, pigeon roosts, among other signs of neglect.

In 2019, the DCAMM began to seek a developer to remodel the Hurley Building, including the likely addition of retail and restaurant spaces on the ground floor. One of four scenarios presented by DCAMM involved complete demolition of the Hurley Building. Later that year, preservationists and architects indicated their opposition to demolition of the building and any damage to its murals. The Massachusetts Historical Commission stepped in and emphasized the building's historical importance, supported by Docomomo and the Paul Rudolph Heritage Foundation, which created an online petition among other initiatives. By the end of 2020, DCAMM conceded that it would no longer consider a complete demolition of the Hurley Building. Four redevelopment proposals were submitted by the December 2021 deadline, although the entries and entrants were not revealed. A winning proposal was planned to be approved in March 2022 and announced in June of that year. Leggat McCall Properties was selected, proposing extensive renovations to the building, including integrating two towers into and above the building, with a total cost above $1 billion.

In 2024, the state announced that it would not move forward with the Leggat McCall plan, citing weakness in the market for lab space. A press release announced a "new redevelopment vision for the Lindemann and Hurley Buildings"; the administration of Governor Maura Healey indicated that the site could instead be turned into public housing. The redevelopment was to also include mixed-use commercial development and "upgraded facilities for the Department of Mental Health’s residential program." In June 2026, the Healey administration put out an official call for redevelopment proposals.

== Impact ==
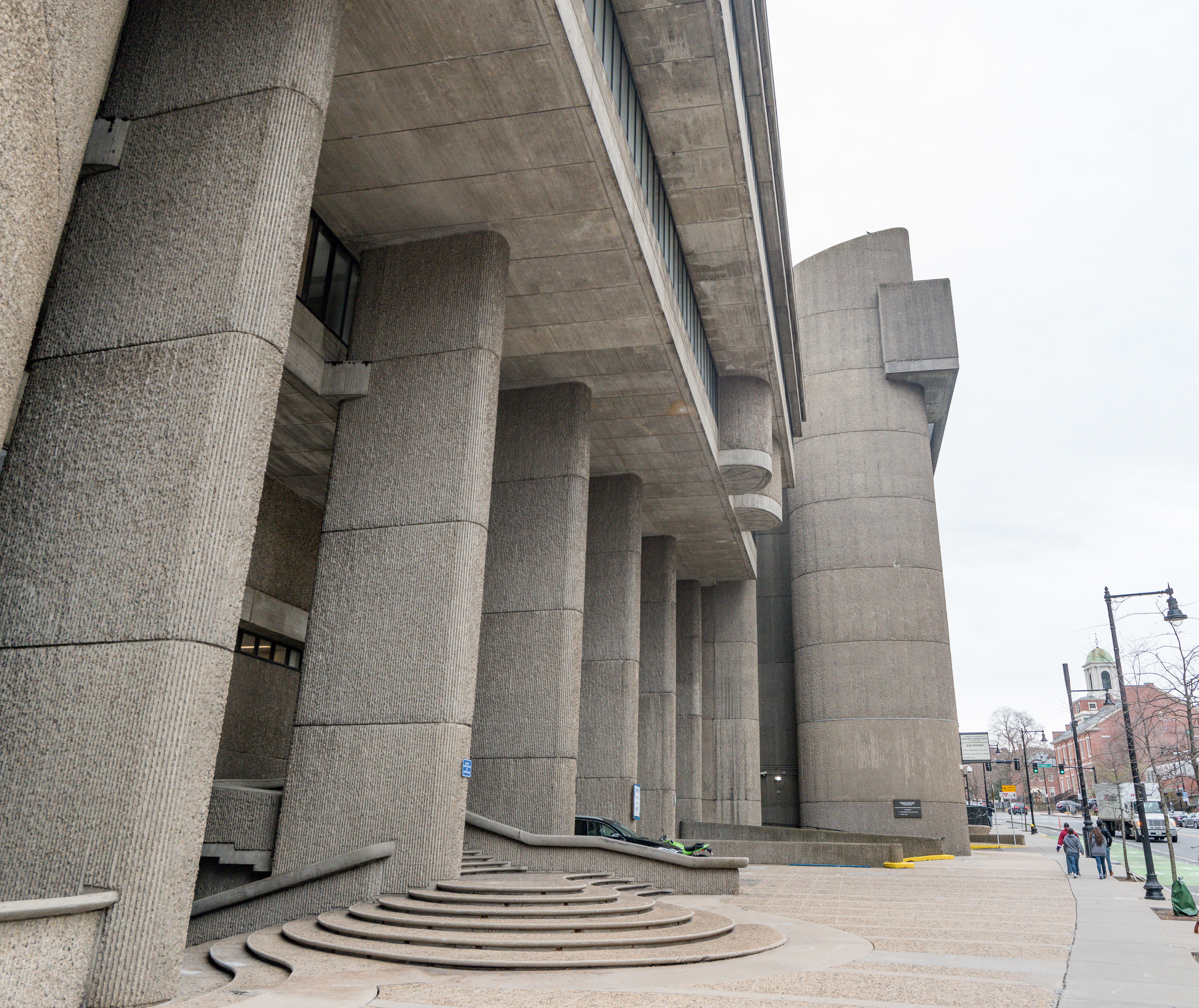
Side stairwell

=== In media ===
The Government Service Center is listed in G. E. Kidder Smith's Source Book of American Architecture: 500 Notable Buildings from the 10th Century to the Present.

The complex is featured in the 2006 film The Departed, where it stands in as a state police headquarters building, and its concrete exterior and main exterior staircase are featured. The Lindemann building also was a filming location for the 2007 feature Gone Baby Gone.

Notable photographs have been taken of the buildings, including a series by Robert Perron published in Werk, a Swiss architecture magazine, in 1972. Perron's photograph of spiral stairs inside one of the buildings was used on the cover of the July 1973 issue of Architectural Record.

=== Critical reception ===
During its construction and at its opening, the building received substantial recognition by at least ten architectural magazines or journals around the world, and appeared in numerous books. The site's model and drawings were presented in a 1979 MoMA exhibit, Transformations in Modern Architecture.

The service center complex is today not favored among Boston residents, as part of the government center that "Bostonians most love to hate", as described by architectural historian Timothy Rohan. Rohan describes the complex as a concrete brutalist castle, strange and forbidding, and representative of the alienating 1960s urban design. It was considered one of the ten "ugliest buildings" in Boston, according to Curbed Boston readers c. 2016.

Historians characterize the buildings in innumerous, and often contradictory ways, including: graceful, imaginative, sensuous, exaggerated, rugged, restless, and heroic. Journalists reviewed the Lindemann center's architecture positively at its 1971 opening, though several noted that the design might not be appropriate to a state building, hospital, or mental health facility. In 1972, Ada Louise Huxtable suggested that the cancellation of the tower on-site was part of toning down the dramatic elements of the project.

Michele Koh, writing for Singapore Architect, expressed that Rudolph's work purposefully reflected the state of inmates at the mental health center, and that in making the mental health building "insane", they would sooth those who feel it reflects their state. Koh cited Vincent Scully, who stated that not every individual may be able to meet the building's psychological demands, and psychiatrist Matthew Dumont, who had feared sending a schizophrenic patient to the Lindemann Center.

A 1974 article in the Boston Globe described the complex as a paradise only for photographers studying light and shadows. It described that the Lindemann appears to appease the monumentous taste of Paul Rudolph, not the modest neighborhood psychiatrist Dr. Lindemann. Staff found the main steps of the center challenging to walk on, as each step is sequentially larger as you walk down the stairs.

=== Landmark designations ===
The Government Service Center is a Category Two complex in Boston, holding major significance for the city, since at least 1970. While the Government Service Center is not currently listed as a national, state, or local landmark, the Boston Landmarks Commission reported in 1990 that the complex is eligible for the National Register of Historic Places, and its exterior and select interiors as a Boston Landmark. A preservation study from 2020 concurrently described that the site is eligible for the national register, as well as the state's historic register.

The 2020 preservation study estimated that the complex will be proposed as a National Historic Landmark for its association with an important architect, and for its extreme departure from prior architectural styles.

== See also ==
- List of Brutalist architecture in the United States
