= Massachusetts Department of Mental Health =

Massachusetts government department

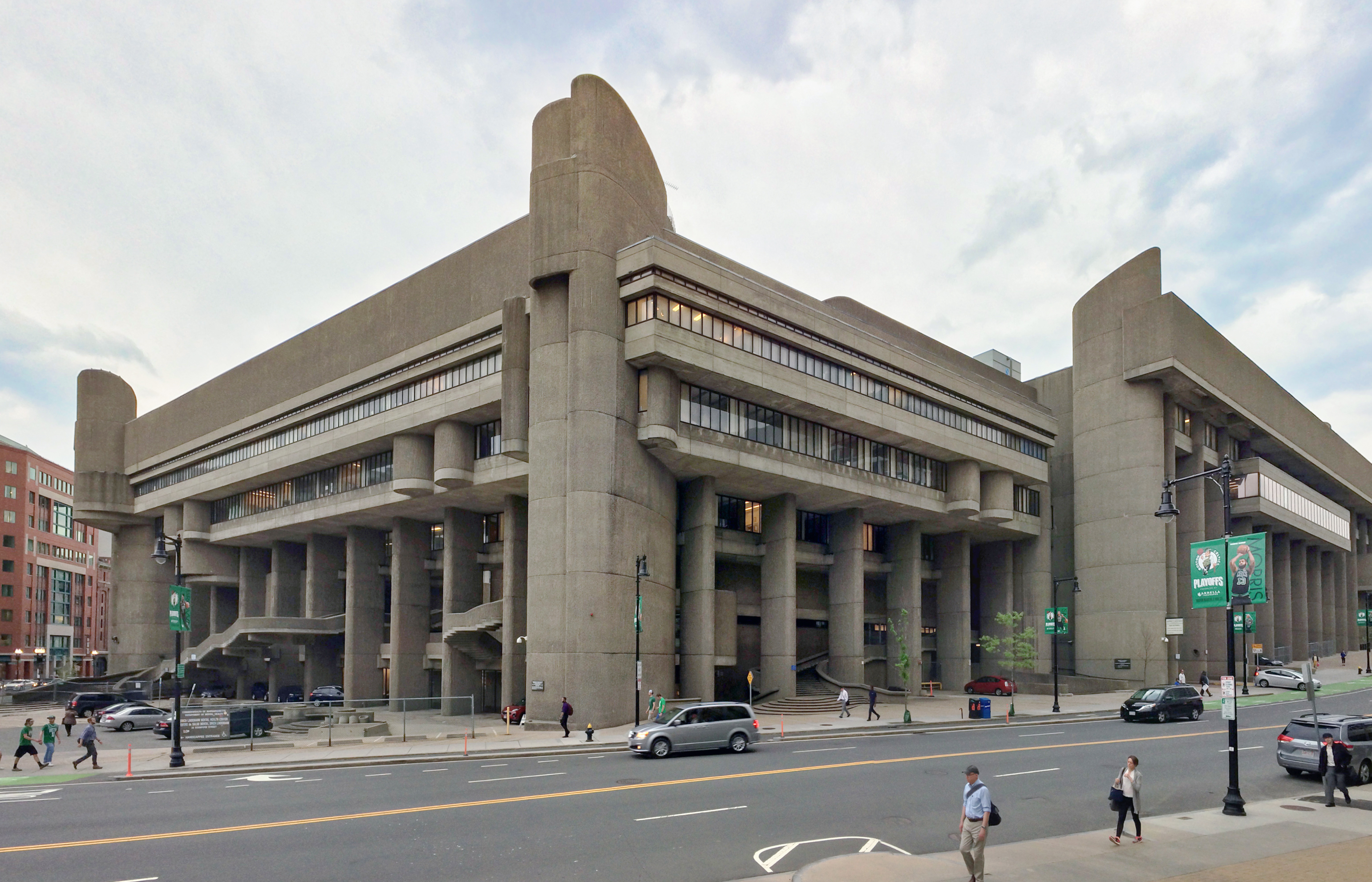
Massachusetts Department of Mental Health, in Government Service Center building

The Massachusetts Department of Mental Health is a state agency of Massachusetts, providing mental health services. Its headquarters are at the Boston Government Service Center in Downtown Boston.
