= M.P.M. Builders, LLC v. Dwyer =

Case of the Massachusetts Supreme Judicial Court

- Court: Massachusetts Supreme Judicial Court
- Full case name: M.P.M. Builders, LLC v. Dwyer
- Decided: June 15, 2004
- Citations: 442 Mass. 87; 809 N.E.2d 1053

Court membership
- Judges sitting: Margaret H. Marshall, John M. Greaney, Roderick L. Ireland, Francis X. Spina, Judith A. Cowin, Martha B. Sosman, Robert J. Cordy

Case opinions
- Decision by: Cowin

Keywords
- easement

M.P.M. Builders, LLC v. Dwyer, 442 Mass. 87, 809 N.E.2d 1053 (2004), was a case decided by the Massachusetts Supreme Judicial Court that first adopted the Restatement Third of Servitudes for the relocation of easements in that state. Attorney(s) appearing for the Case: Robert S. Mangiaratti (Judith S. Yogman with him) for the plaintiff and Edmund J. Brennan, Jr. (Michael J. Polak with him) for the defendant.

== Factual background ==
Dwyer owned a dominant estate that had an easement across a parcel owned by M.P.M. Builders that connected to a public road at several points. M.P.M. wanted to develop the lots, but the easement ran through the planned development. M.P.M. proposed to relocate the easement and create new connections to the public road. Dwyer declined, and M.P.M. sought a declaratory judgment that they were allowed to unilaterally relocate the easement.

== Decision ==
The lower Land Court ruled against M.P.M. The Massachusetts Supreme Judicial Court ruled that the Land Court correctly applied existing law, but that the standard for unilateral relocation of an easement by the owner of a servient estate in the Restatement Third of Servitudes was better suited to modern times. The Restatement allowed for unilateral relocation of the easement if it did not lessen the utility of the easement, increase the burdens on the owner of the easement, or frustrate the purpose of the easement. The court noted that this may often call for a hearing to determine what would constitute a reasonable relocation.
