= King v. Trustees of Boston Univ. =

1995 US legal case

- Court: Massachusetts Supreme Judicial Court
- Full case name: Coretta Scott King, vs. Trustees of Boston University
- Decided: April 12, 1995
- Defendant: Trustees of Boston University
- Plaintiff: Coretta Scott King

Court membership
- Judges sitting: Paul Julian Liacos, Ruth Abrams, Joseph R. Nolan, Neil L. Lynch

Case opinions
- Decision by: Ruth Abrams

King v. Trustees of Boston Univ. 420 Mass. 52 was a contracts case tried in the Massachusetts Supreme Judicial Court in 1995, involving gratuitous transfer and consideration. Coretta Scott King the administratrix of the estate of Martin Luther King Jr. submitted a motion for judgment to the trial court to recover papers that Martin Luther King Jr. submitted to Boston University, claiming that the papers were the property of the estate. The trial court ruled in favor of the defendant, the papers were deposited as a charitable contribution to Boston University. The plaintiff appealed, the trial courts decision was affirmed.

== Facts ==
Martin Luther King Jr., an alumnus of Boston University, was asked in 1963 to deposit some papers in their library's newly expanded special collections. The plaintiff testified that her husband thought "Boston seemed to be the only place, the best place, for safety," but was concerned that placing them there could subject him to criticism. King deposited some papers but sent a letter on July 16, 1964, to the university indicating that the papers would remain his legal property unless otherwise indicated. The letter contained two important statements:

"In accordance with this action I have authorized the removal of most of the above-mentioned papers and other objects to Boston University, including most correspondence through 1961, at once. It is my intention that after the end of each calendar year, similar files of materials for an additional year should be sent to Boston University." "I intend each year to indicate a portion of the materials deposited with Boston University to become the absolute property of Boston University as an outright gift from me, until all shall have been thus given to the University. In the event of my death, all such materials deposited with the University shall become from that date the absolute property of Boston University"

— Martin Luther King Jr.

King asserted that her husband made a statement of intent to act in the future, there was no consideration and jury instructions were improper. The jury found that the papers were submitted to Boston University as a charitable pledge, not a contract.

== Opinion of the Court ==
The opinion was written by Ruth Abrams where the court affirmed the lower court's judgment that the papers were submitted to Boston University as an enforceable charitable pledge, where there was a promise to give property to a charitable institution. The letter was not a contract between the parties because there was no indication of bargained for exchange to bind Dr. King to his promise.
