= Margot Botsford =

American judge

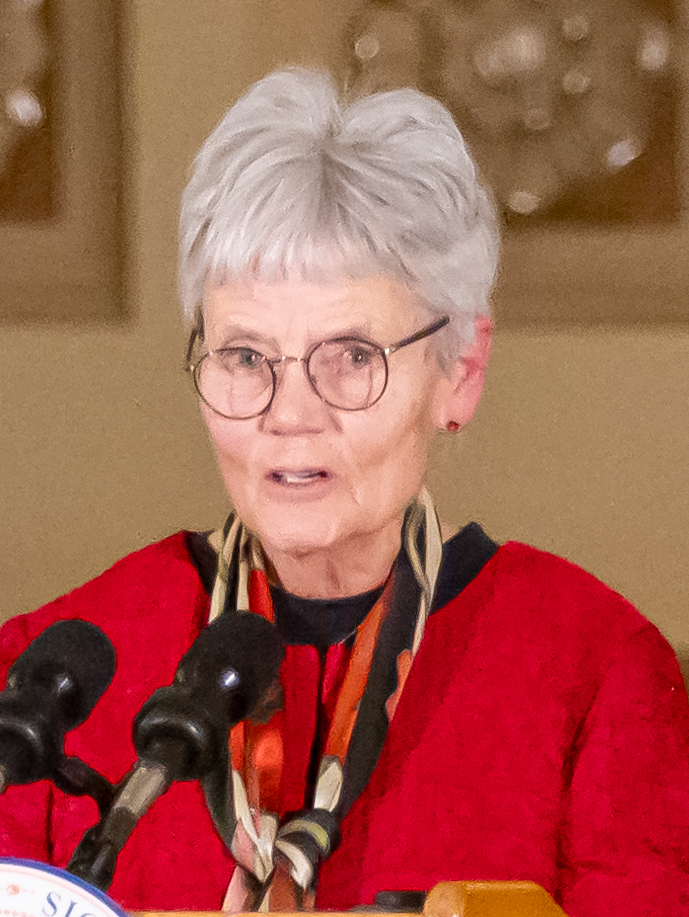
- Botsford in 2024

Associate Justice of the Massachusetts Supreme Judicial Court
- In office September 4, 2007 – March 15, 2017
- Appointed by: Deval Patrick
- Preceded by: Martha B. Sosman
- Succeeded by: Elspeth B. Cypher

Associate Justice of the Massachusetts Superior Court
- In office 1989–2007
- Appointed by: Michael Dukakis

Personal details
- Born: March 16, 1947 (age 79) New York City, New York, U.S.
- Education: Barnard College; Northeastern University School of Law; Harvard Kennedy School

Margot Botsford (/ˈmɑːrɡoʊ ˈbɑːtsfɔːrd/; born March 16, 1947, in New York City) is an American lawyer and jurist from Massachusetts. She was appointed by Governor Deval Patrick in 2007 to serve as an associate justice of the Massachusetts Supreme Judicial Court.

== Biography ==
Botsford graduated magna cum laude with a B.A. from Barnard College in 1969. At Barnard, she was a member of Phi Beta Kappa society. She earned her J.D. degree from Northeastern University School of Law in 1973. She later earned a Master of Public Administration degree from the John F. Kennedy School of Government at Harvard University in 2007.

Upon graduating law school in 1973, Botsford served as a law clerk to Massachusetts Supreme Judicial Court Justice Francis J. Quirico. She subsequently served as an Assistant Attorney General under Attorney General Francis X. Bellotti for four years. She later served as an assistant district attorney in the office of Middlesex County District Attorney Scott Harshbarger for six years.

Botsford practiced law in the private sector as an associate at the firm of Hill & Barlow for one year before going on to serve as a partner at Rosenfeld, Botsford & Krokidas, a Boston law firm, for three years.

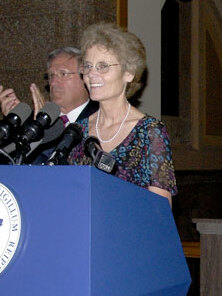
Botsford during her swearing-in ceremony to the Supreme Judicial Court

In 1989, Botsford was appointed as an associate justice of the Superior Court, where she served for eighteen years until her appointment to the Supreme Judicial Court after the death of Justice Martha B. Sosman.

Botsford has also taught at the Northeastern University School of Law, Massachusetts Continuing Legal Education (MCLE) Boston University Law School, the National Judicial College, and the Flaschner Judicial Institute.

Legal offices
Preceded by Martha B. Sosman	Associate Justice of the Massachusetts Supreme Judicial Court; 2007–2017	Succeeded by Elspeth B. Cypher
