= Barbara Lenk =

American judge (1950–2026)

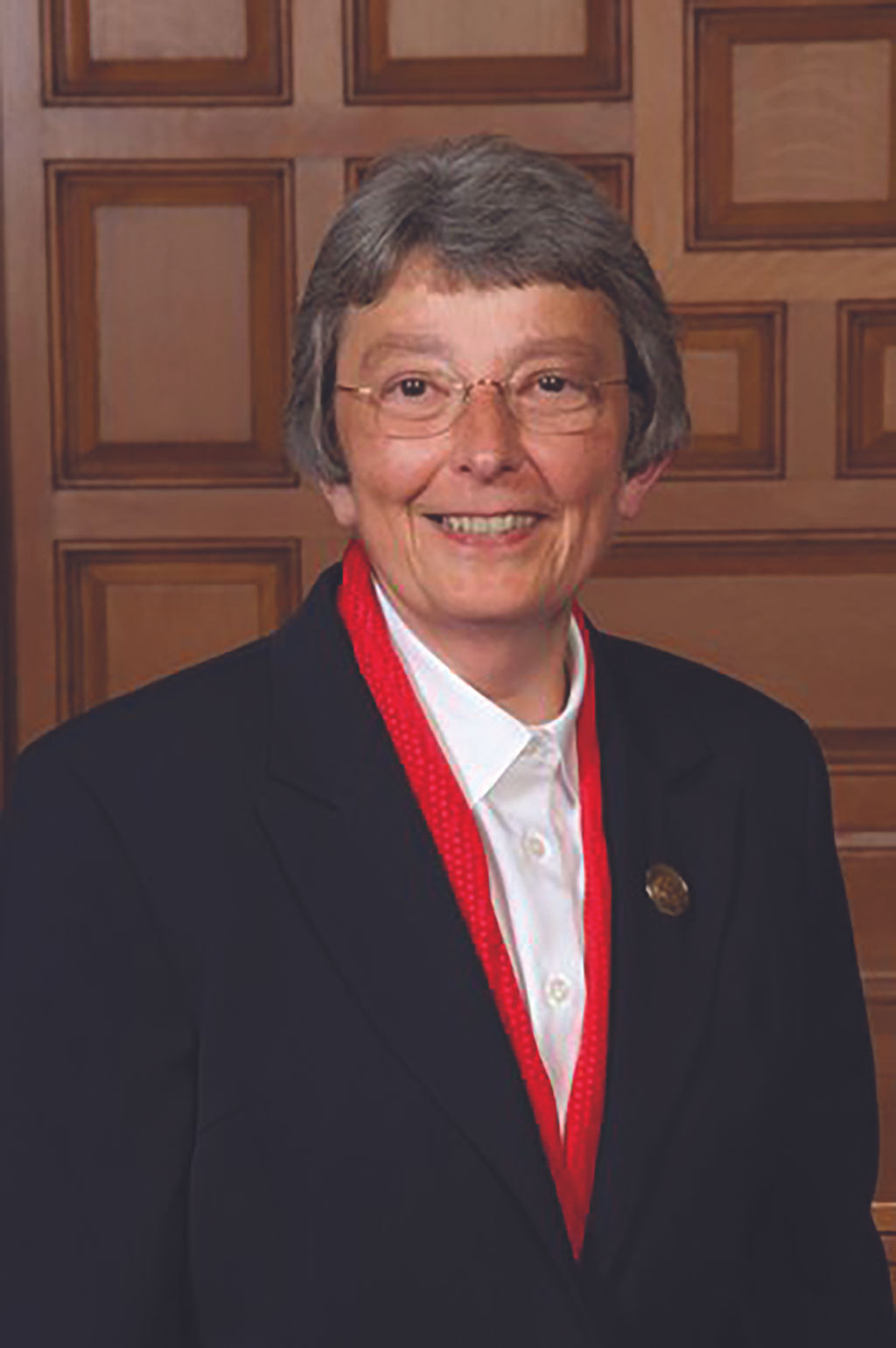

Chief Justice of the Massachusetts Supreme Judicial Court\
- Acting
- In office September 14, 2020 – December 1, 2020
- Preceded by: Ralph Gants
- Succeeded by: Kimberly S. Budd

Associate Justice of the Massachusetts Supreme Judicial Court
- In office June 8, 2011 – December 1, 2020
- Appointed by: Deval Patrick
- Preceded by: Judith Cowin
- Succeeded by: Dalila Argaez Wendlandt

Personal details
- Born: December 2, 1950 New York City, New York, U.S.
- Died: May 19, 2026 (aged 75)
- Spouse: Debra Krupp
- Children: 2
- Education: Fordham University (BA); Yale University (MA, PhD); Harvard University (JD)

Barbara A. Lenk (December 2, 1950 – May 19, 2026) was an American attorney and jurist who served as an associate justice of the Massachusetts Supreme Judicial Court. On April 4, 2011, Massachusetts Governor Deval Patrick nominated her to that position and she was confirmed by the Governor's Council on May 4, 2011. She took the oath of office on June 8, 2011.

== Early life and education ==
Justice Lenk was born in Queens, New York, on December 2, 1950. Her parents were a bookbinder and a housekeeper. Her first language was Polish. She received a Bachelor of Arts magna cum laude from Fordham University in 1972, a Doctor of Philosophy in political philosophy from Yale University in 1978, and a Juris Doctor from Harvard Law School in 1979.

== Career ==
Upon graduation from law school, she joined the Boston law firm of Brown, Rudnick, Freed & Gesmer and was a partner there for six years. Her practice focused on civil litigation, with a specialty in First Amendment issues.

=== Judicial service ===
In 1993, Massachusetts Governor Bill Weld, a Republican, named her to the state's Superior Court. She served there until Weld appointed her to the Appeals Court, where she began her service on June 20, 1995. When nominated to serve on the Supreme Judicial Court, Justice Lenk was the longest serving member of the Appeals Court.

==== Legal Challenge to Pledge of Allegiance ====
In May 2014, the Supreme Judicial Court unanimously rejected a legal challenge to a Massachusetts law requiring the recitation of the Pledge of Allegiance in schools. The court ruled that the inclusion of the words "under God" did not violate the rights of atheists because, in the court's view, reciting the pledge "is a fundamentally patriotic exercise, not a religious one."

In a separate concurring opinion, Lenk explained that she agreed with the outcome of the court's decision because the plaintiffs challenging the state law "did not successfully allege that their children receive negative treatment" as a result of their decision not to recite the words "under God," or that their children had been reduced to "second-class citizen[]" status because of their beliefs. However, Lenk also wrote that "should future plaintiffs demonstrate that the distinction created by the pledge as currently written has engendered bullying or differential treatment, I would leave open the possibility that the equal rights amendment [of the Massachusetts state constitution] might provide a remedy.”

==== Other notable cases ====
In 2017, Justice Lenk found that the federal Stored Communications Act did not prevent the personal representatives of a deceased person from accessing his emails. In July 2017, Lenk reported to the court the case in which it unanimously held that the commonwealth's law enforcement could not hold a prisoner solely on the authority of a U.S. Immigration and Customs Enforcement detainer.

=== Retirement ===
Lenk announced her retirement from the court, initially effective August 17, 2020, but she later delayed her retirement to December 1, 2020, one day before she turned 70. During Lenk's last week sitting for oral arguments, fellow Justice Frank Gaziano praised her for her "intellectual honesty" and for being "faithful to the law," saying that "Justice Lenk's contributions are impactful and will be long remembered."

== Personal life and death ==
Lenk served on the board of directors of the Volunteer Lawyers Project of the Boston Bar Association, as chair of the Board of Editors of the Boston Bar Journal, and as a member of the Judicial Administration Council of the Massachusetts Bar Association. She was a Trustee of Western New England University, where she chaired the academic affairs committee, and a member of the Boston Inn of Court. Lenk served on the board of directors for Kerem Shalom in Concord, Massachusetts.

She was a lesbian. Lenk married her wife, attorney Debra Krupp, following the legalization of same-sex marriage in Massachusetts in 2004. They had two adopted children. She was the first openly gay member of the Massachusetts Supreme Judicial Court.

Lenk died on May 19, 2026, at the age of 75.

== See also ==
- List of LGBT jurists in the United States
- List of LGBT state supreme court justices in the United States

Legal offices
Preceded by Judith Cowin	Associate Justice of the Massachusetts Supreme Judicial Court; 2011–2020	Succeeded by Dalila Argaez Wendlandt
Preceded by Ralph Gants	Chief Justice of the Massachusetts Supreme Judicial Court; Acting; 2020	Succeeded by Kimberly S. Budd
