= Arthur Whittemore =

American judge (1896–1969)

Arthur Easterbrook Whittemore (June 3, 1896 – October 1, 1969) was a justice of the Massachusetts Supreme Judicial Court from 1955 to 1969. He was appointed by Governor Christian Herter.

Whittemore was born on June 3, 1896, in Reading, Massachusetts to father Frederick Ellsworth Whittemore and mother Edith Lillian Easterbrook. Frederick was principal of Reading High School. In 1904, Fredrick was given the position of Superintendent of South Hadley-Granby Schools, and the Whittemores moved to South Hadley, Massachusetts. Whittemore attended and graduated from South Hadley High School in 1913. Whittemore attended Harvard University and in 1917, graduated with a Bachelor of Science Degree in Chemistry.

For two years after his graduation from Harvard, Whittemore served in the Army of the United States as a lieutenant in Company B, 168th Regiment, 42nd Infantry Division, where he spent most of his time in France and Germany. Whittemore noted that if not for the war, it was likely he would have become a chemist.

Upon returning from war, Whittemore decided to enroll in Harvard Law School in 1919. He graduated in 1922 and joined the law firm Nutter McClennen & Fish, a firm founded by Louis D. Brandeis and Samuel D. Warren II. He was made a partner in 1930.

Whittemore was married in 1924 to Suvia Lanice Paton. He had three children: Suvia, Elizabeth and Arthur Whittemore. Whittemore and his family lived in Hingham, Massachusetts.

In 1942, Whittemore served as a Special Assistant Attorney General to deal with the reorganization of the New York, New Haven and Hartford Railroad and the Old Colony Railroad. Additionally he was a member of several presidentially appointed boards dealing with fact-finding in railroad labor disputes.

In October 1955, Whittemore was appointed to the Massachusetts Supreme Judicial Court by Governor Christian A. Herter, serving thereafter until his death.

Whittemore died on October 1, 1969, at his home in Hingham.

Political offices
Preceded by Henry T. Lummus	Justice of the Massachusetts Supreme Judicial Court; 1955–1969	Succeeded by Francis J. Quirico
