= Elspeth B. Cypher =

American judge (born 1959)

Elspeth Cypher
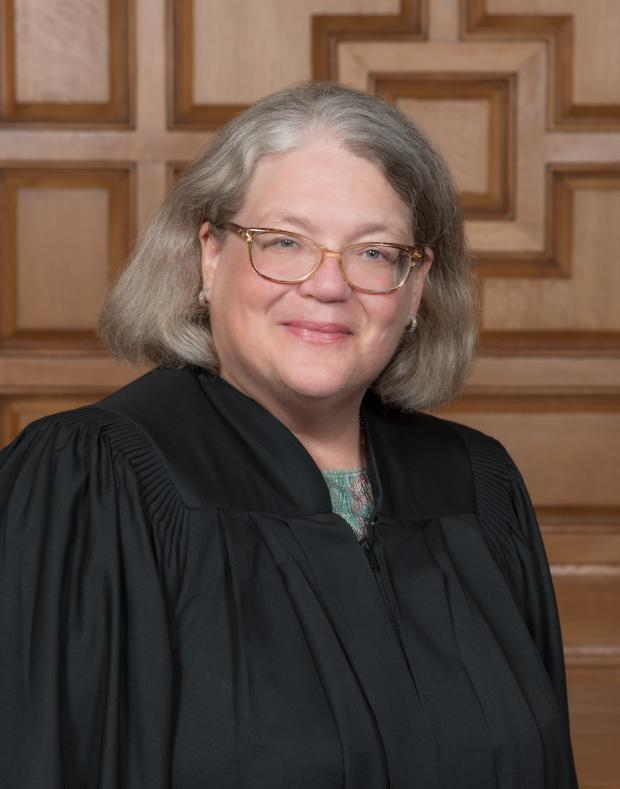

Associate Justice of the Massachusetts Supreme Judicial Court
- In office March 31, 2017 – January 12, 2024
- Appointed by: Charlie Baker
- Preceded by: Margot Botsford
- Succeeded by: Bessie Dewar

Associate Justice of the Massachusetts Appeals Court
- In office December 27, 2000 – March 31, 2017
- Appointed by: Paul Cellucci
- Succeeded by: Dalila Argaez Wendlandt

Personal details
- Born: February 26, 1959 (age 67) Pittsburgh, Pennsylvania, U.S.
- Party: Democratic
- Spouse: Sharon Levesque
- Children: 1
- Education: Emerson College (BA); Suffolk University (JD)

Elspeth B. Cypher (born February 26, 1959) is a former justice of the Supreme Judicial Court of Massachusetts who served from 2017 to 2024. She is also a former justice of the Massachusetts Appeals Court, where she served from 2000 to 2017.

== Biography ==
Cypher was born in Pittsburgh, Pennsylvania, on February 26, 1959. She earned her Bachelor of Arts from Emerson College in 1980 and her Juris Doctor from Suffolk University Law School in 1986. She began her legal career as an associate with the law firm Grayer, Brown and Dilday. She left the firm in 1988 to become an assistant district attorney in Bristol County. In 1993, she became the chief of the appellate division of this office and served in this capacity until her appointment to the appeals court.

Cypher and her wife, Sharon Levesque, live in Assonet, Massachusetts, and have one son.

== Judicial career ==
=== Massachusetts Appeals Court ===
Cypher was an associate justice on the Massachusetts Appeals Court. She was appointed by Governor Paul Cellucci and took the bench on December 27, 2000. She served in that capacity until her elevation to the Massachusetts Supreme Judicial Court on March 31, 2017.

=== Massachusetts Supreme Judicial Court ===
She was appointed to the Supreme Judicial Court in February 2017 by Governor Charlie Baker to succeed retiring Justice Margot Botsford. She was confirmed by the Governor's Council on March 8, 2017. She was sworn into office on March 31, 2017. She was ceremonially sworn in on May 18, 2017. She retired from active service on January 12, 2024.

== Academic career ==
Cypher was an adjunct professor at Southern New England School of Law (now the University of Massachusetts School of Law - Dartmouth), where she taught courses on legal writing; criminal procedure; criminal law; and women, law, and the legal system.

== See also ==
- List of LGBT state supreme court justices in the United States
- List of LGBT jurists in the United States

Legal offices
Preceded by Margot Botsford	Associate Justice of the Massachusetts Supreme Judicial Court; 2017–2024	Succeeded by Bessie Dewar
