= Peter W. Agnes Jr. =

American judge

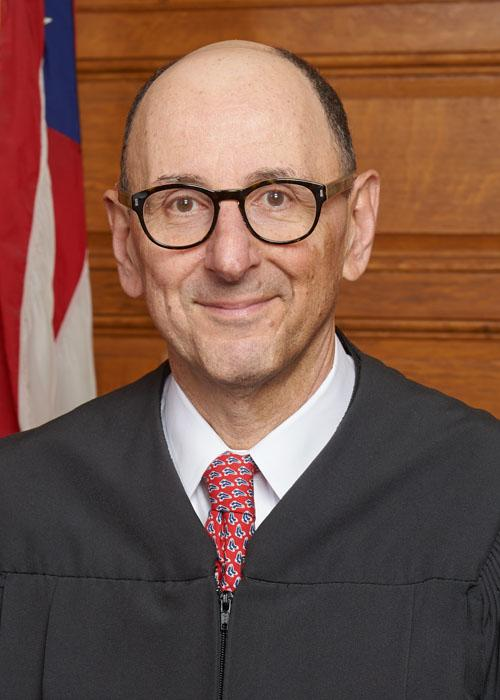
Portrait

Judge Peter W. Agnes Jr. (born April 12, 1950) is a former justice of the Massachusetts Appeals Court as an Associate Justice, having been appointed by Governor Deval Patrick in 2011 and serving until reaching the mandatory retirement age of 70 in 2020. In addition to being an active member of the legal community in providing "…service on numerous Supreme Judicial Court and Bar Association committees, commissions[,]…task forces, [et al.]…," Justice Agnes has also been passionate about education, having taught at the Massachusetts School of Law for the past fifteen years, and continuing to do so currently. Agnes presently resides in Wayland, MA with his wife Eileen Agnes (a family law attorney). They have four children and three grandchildren, boasting a passionate relationship with their extensive family outside of their legal careers.

== Early life and education ==
Born and raised in Somerville, MA, he spent his undergraduate career at Boston University, from which he graduated in 1972 cum laude, and subsequently attended Suffolk University Law School, graduating (again, cum laude) in 1975 with his Juris Doctor. Immediately upon entering the legal world, Justice Agnes was hired as a law clerk under New Hampshire Supreme Court Justice Edward Lampron. From 1976 through 1982, he served an Assistant District Attorney in two districts: Middlesex County (MA), — becoming Chief of the Appellate Division there — and Norfolk County (MA). The remainer of his pre-judicial career consisted of serving as "…both the Assistant Secretary for Public Safety and Acting Director of the Massachusetts Criminal Justice Training Council," for the next three years, and then "Chief of Operations for Governor Michael Dukakis until 1991."

Justice Agnes presided over the final competition of the 2010 Massachusetts Bar Association's Mock Trial Program, held at Faneuil Hall in Boston, among two of his legal peers. It is likely that his ongoing public affiliation with various legal committees, associations, and task groups has had more of an influence than anything with which he may have been engaged during his time at Suffolk Law.

== Judicial career ==
Justice Agnes's judicial career has been both meaningful and exemplary. Appointed to the Charlestown District Court in 1991 by Governor Michael Dukakis, — likely as the result of the time he spent working under Dukakis as his Chief of Operations — Agnes remained there for nine years. There have been no notable, publicized rulings of Agnes' during his time at the district court. During this nine-year period, Justice Agnes built his respectable, yet very local reputation among his peers — a reputation which soon led to a promotion.

The majority of Agnes' legal career has been spent on the Worcester Superior Court in Massachusetts, to which he was appointed in 2000 by then-Governor Paul Cellucci. It was on this seat that Justice Agnes molded his reputation, as Worcester Superior Court Judge John McCann notes, "…as a judge who does not shy away from 'the tough calls' and is fair and thoughtful in all his rulings". One such case involves a 59-year-old man twice convicted of child rape. Loran D. Scott, admitting, during a jury-waived trial in front of Judge Agnes, that he was "likely to re-offend if released from custody" due to "a long-standing substance abuse problem," and recurring "sexual 'thoughts and fantasies.'" Admitting, among other things, psychological evaluations — which ultimately diagnosed Scott with schizophrenia and a personality disorder — Justice Agnes found that Scott is a "sexually dangerous person as defined by the law" and committed him to the Massachusetts Treatment Center for Sex Offenders. Straight interpretation and appropriate rulings in cases such as these were what elevated Agnes' ability as a jurist in the eyes of his peers and in the eyes of those among the public who paid attention.

At his Governor's Council Appeals Court hearing, according to the Lawyers Weekly, “…the only sticking point that could defeat Agnes may be buried in a case filed in Worcester Superior Court in 2006. Where a couple attending the hearing … [stated] the judge ignored a Rule 59(e) motion to amend the judgment in their case, thus preventing a final decision and their subsequent right to appeal.” Councilor Mary-Ellen Manning told the couple that the council would investigate. Nothing significant was found.

It is worth noting that during his time on the Worcester Superior Court, Judge Agnes ultimately became a specialized Regional Administrative Justice, remaining as such for the remainder of his time there, and, further, that throughout that eleven-year period, Agnes was considered to be appointed to the Massachusetts Supreme Judicial Court — a position which he has yet to attain — on three separate occasions.

In 2011 Agnes left the Worcester Superior Court, having been appointed to the state Appeals Court by Governor Deval Patrick. In what seemed to have been "the most intensive questioning of a judicial nominee in the past 10 years," according to Governor's Council member Marilyn Devaney, Judge Agnes was confirmed to the state Appeals Court, on which he currently serves. Admitting that becoming an appellate judge was "'something that I've had an interest in for a long time,'" Agnes described himself as having "'mixed feelings'" and that he had built a passionate connection with Worcester over the past eleven years, which, despite the promotion, he hoped to preserve.

== Awards and honors ==
Justice Agnes was the recipient of the Order of St. Michael the Archangel Award for the year 2011 from the Massachusetts Association of Italian-American Police Officers, being recognized "with distinction as the President of the Massachusetts Judges Association, the President of the Justinian Law Society of Massachusetts, the Chairman of the Board of the Dante Alighieri Society, and [as being] one of the founders of October as Italian-American Heritage Month." Agnes's late father, Peter W. Agnes Sr., was a retired police officer — Lieutenant Colonel — of the Massachusetts State Police, and to whom Judge Agnes ascribes the basis for the development of his own values and his active service to the public.
