= Judith Cowin =

American judge (born 1942)

Judith Cathy Arnold Cowin (born April 29, 1942) is a retired justice of the Massachusetts Supreme Judicial Court.

== Biography ==
She was born in Boston.

Cowin received her undergraduate degree from Wellesley College and her J.D. degree from Harvard Law School. She began her legal career in 1971 as assistant legal counsel to the Massachusetts Department of Mental Health. The following year, she became legal counsel for the Office of the Chief Justice of the District Court Department. From 1979 to 1991, she worked as an Assistant District Attorney in Norfolk County, and in 1980 she was a clinical field supervisor at Harvard Law School. She was appointed to the Superior Court in 1991. Governor Paul Cellucci appointed her to the Supreme Judicial Court in 1999. Cardinal Bernard Law criticized her nomination.

She announced that she would retire from the court in April 2011. Barbara Lenk was nominated to succeed her and won confirmation on May 4, 2011.

Cowin was married to retired Appeals Court Justice William I. Cowin. They have three grown children.

== Notable opinions ==
- M.P.M. Builders, LLC v. Dwyer, 442 Mass. 87, 809 N.E.2d 1053 (2004)

== Notes ==
Legal offices
Preceded by Charles Fried	Associate Justice of the Massachusetts Supreme Judicial Court; 1999-2011	Succeeded by Barbara Lenk
