= Benjamin Kaplan =

American copyright and procedure scholar and jurist (1911–2010)

Benjamin Kaplan (April 11, 1911 – August 18, 2010) was an American copyright and procedure scholar and jurist. He was also notable as "one of the principal architects" of the Nuremberg trials. And as Reporter to the U.S. Judicial Conference Advisory Committee on Civil Rules, he played a pivotal role in the 1966 revisions to Federal Rule of Civil Procedure 23, which transformed class action practice in the U.S.

== Early life and education ==
Kaplan grew up in the South Bronx, graduating from DeWitt Clinton High School at the age of 14. He then attended City College, graduating in 1929 at the age of 18, and Columbia Law School in 1933, and engaged in private practice until 1942 when he joined the Army.

== Career ==
In 1945, while a lieutenant colonel in the army, Kaplan joined the prosecution team developing the case against the Nazi war criminals. Kaplan supervised the research and developed legal strategies for the case. In 1947 he joined the faculty at Harvard Law School.

Kaplan co-wrote the first casebook on copyright, with Yale Law School Professor Ralph Brown in 1960. As the Royall Professor of Law at Harvard Law School, he delivered a series of lectures at Columbia Law in 1966. The James S. Carpentier Lectures were then published in 1967 as An Unhurried View of Copyright.

Kaplan was also an influential proceduralist. He co-edited the first process casebook to address the 1938 Federal Rules of Civil Procedure in 1952 with Richard Field.

Among Kaplan's students at Harvard were future U.S. Supreme Court Justices Ruth Bader Ginsburg and Stephen Breyer, the latter of whose views on copyright appear to have been influenced by those of Judge Kaplan. Among his former law clerks are the influential scholar Cass Sunstein and First Amendment attorney Marjorie Heins.

Kaplan also served on the Massachusetts Supreme Judicial Court from 1972 to 1981 and later on the Massachusetts Appeals Court.

== Family ==
In 1942 Kaplan married to Felicia Lamport (1916 – 23 December 1999), a political satirist and writer of light verse. The couple had two children.

== Death ==
Kaplan died of pneumonia in his Cambridge, Massachusetts home on August 18, 2010 at 99 years old. Tributes compiled in the Harvard Law Review were authored by Justices Breyer and Ginsberg, Massachusetts Appeals Court Associate Justice Raya Dreben, Marjorie Heins, Arthur R. Miller, Martha Minow and Lloyd L. Weinreb.

== Bibliography ==
- An Unhurried View of Copyright (1967; Reprinted 2008 by The Lawbook Exchange, Ltd. in hardcover and paperback.

Legal offices
Preceded by R. Ammi Cutter	Associate Justice of the Massachusetts Supreme Judicial Court; 1972-1981	Succeeded by Neil L. Lynch
