= R. Ammi Cutter =

American judge (1902–1993)

Richard Ammi Cutter (May 11, 1902 – November 28, 1993) was a justice of the Massachusetts Supreme Judicial Court from 1956 to 1972. He was appointed by Governor Christian Herter.

Cutter was born in Salem, Massachusetts and attended Noble and Greenough School. He graduated from Harvard College and Harvard Law School, where he was editor of the Harvard Law Review. Cutter entered private practice after graduating from law school in 1925, until he became the assistant attorney general for Massachusetts in 1927. During World War II, he reached the rank of major in the United States Army. He would stay in private practice after the war until being appointed to the state Supreme Court in 1956.

He was a member of the Harvard Board of Overseers from 1966 to 1972.

Political offices
Preceded by Stanley Elroy Qua	Justice of the Massachusetts Supreme Judicial Court; 1956–1972	Succeeded by Benjamin Kaplan
