= Judge Abrams =

Judge Abrams may refer to:

- Paul Lewis Abrams (born 1958), magistrate judge for the United States Central District of California
- Ronnie Abrams (born 1968), judge of the United States District Court for the Southern District of New York

== See also ==
- Leslie Abrams Gardner (née Leslie Joyce Abrams; born 1974), judge of the United States District Court for the Middle District of Georgia
- Ruth Abrams (1930–2019), associate justice of the Massachusetts Supreme Judicial Court
