= David A. Lowy =

American judge (born 1960)

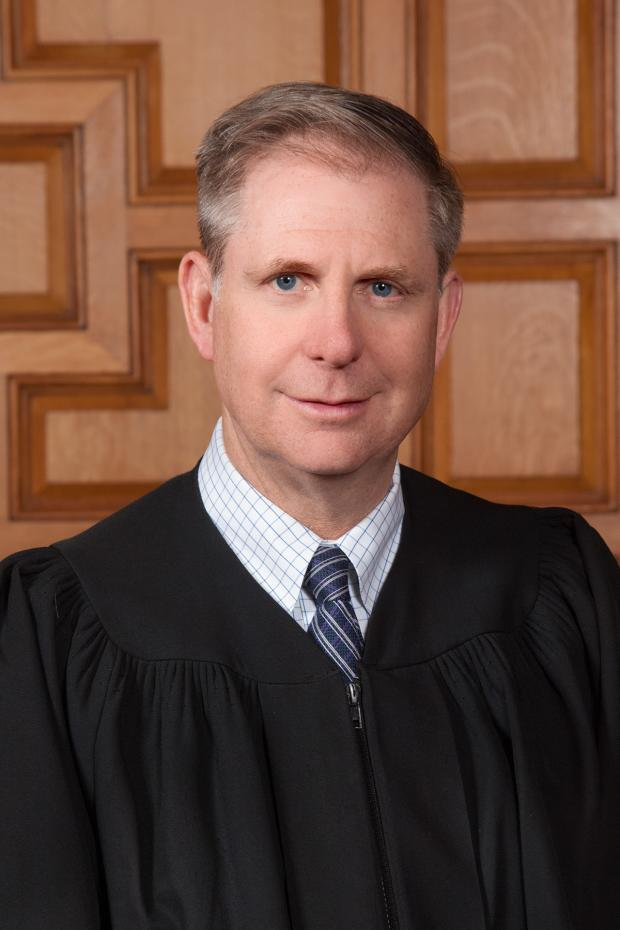

Associate Justice of the Massachusetts Supreme Judicial Court
- In office August 24, 2016 – February 3, 2024
- Appointed by: Charlie Baker
- Preceded by: Robert J. Cordy
- Succeeded by: Gabrielle Wolohojian

Associate Justice of the Massachusetts Superior Court
- In office 2001 – August 24, 2016
- Appointed by: Paul Cellucci
- Succeeded by: Salim Tabit

Personal details
- Born: 1959 or 1960 (age 65–66)
- Education: University of Massachusetts Amherst (BA); Boston University (JD)

David A. Lowy (born 1960) is an American attorney, academic and jurist who served as an associate justice of the Supreme Judicial Court of Massachusetts from 2016 to 2024. In February 2024 Lowy was named general counsel for the University of Massachusetts.

== Early life and education ==
Lowy is a native of Peabody, Massachusetts and graduated from Peabody Veterans Memorial High School in 1978. Lowy received his Bachelor of Arts from the University of Massachusetts Amherst in 1983 and his Juris Doctor from Boston University School of Law in 1987.

== Career ==
After law school, Lowy became an associate in the litigation department of Goodwin, Procter & Hoar from 1987 to 1988 and again 1989 to 1990. In 1988, he served as a law clerk to Judge Edward F. Harrington of the United States District Court for the District of Massachusetts. He then served as an assistant district attorney in Essex County. In 1991, he became deputy legal counsel to Governor Bill Weld. In 1993, helped draft the governor’s first anti-crime legislative package. In 1995, Lowy left the Weld administration to work for the Suffolk County district attorney’s gang unit.

=== Judicial career ===
On July 26, 1997, outgoing governor Bill Weld appointed Lowy to the Ipswich District Court. On August 20, 1997, the Massachusetts Governor's Council voted unanimously to confirm Lowy. In 2001, he was nominated to the Massachusetts Superior Court by Governor Paul Cellucci. In 2015, he presided over the trial of Philip Chism, a 15-year old Danvers High School student who was convicted of raping and killing his teacher, Colleen Ritzer.

He was nominated to the Massachusetts Supreme Judicial Court by Governor Charlie Baker on June 14, 2016, and confirmed by the Governor's Council on July 27, 2016. He succeeded Justice Robert J. Cordy upon his retirement on August 12, 2016.

In July 2018, Lowy wrote for the unanimous court when it found that a probationer suffering from opioid use disorder could be imprisoned for a probation violation after she tested positive for fentanyl.

Lowy retired from the court on February 3, 2024.

=== Teaching ===
Lowy has had several teaching positions which include adjunct professorships at New England Law Boston since 1991, Suffolk University Law School from 1995 to 2005, and Boston University School of Law since 2006, where he teaches courses in evidence.

== Personal life ==
Lowy is married to Virginia Buckingham, who was chief of staff to Governors Weld and Cellucci and executive director of Massport. They reside in Marblehead, Massachusetts.

== See also ==
- List of Jewish American jurists

Legal offices
Preceded by Robert J. Cordy	Associate Justice of the Massachusetts Supreme Judicial Court; 2016–2024	Succeeded by Gabrielle Wolohojian
