= South Hadley High School =

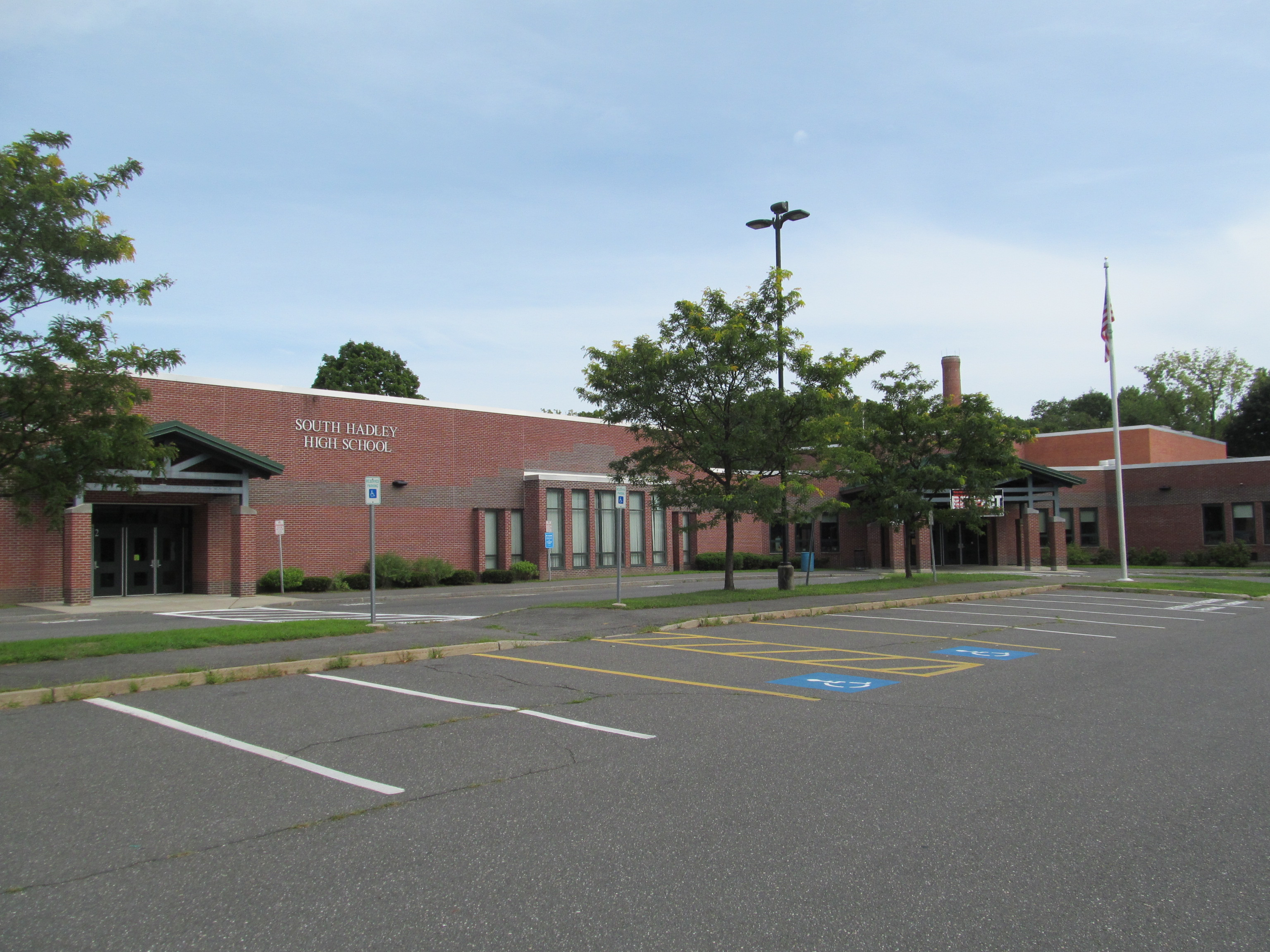
- South Hadley High School in 2012

Location
- 153 Newton Street; South Hadley, Massachusetts 01075; United States; 42°13′40″N 72°35′11″W

Information
- Type: Public; high school; Open enrollment
- Founded: 1870
- Superintendent: Jennifer Voyik
- Principal: Elizabeth Wood
- Staff: 58.18 (FTE)
- Grades: 9–12
- Enrollment: 500 (2022-23)
- Student to teacher ratio: 8.59
- Colors: Orange & black
- Team name: Tigers
- Newspaper: Spotlight
- Yearbook: Gateway
- TV Program: Tiger Times
- Website: www.southhadleyschools.org/our-schools/south-hadley-high-school/about-us

South Hadley High School is a secondary school in South Hadley, Massachusetts, United States, for students in grades 9–12. The school has a student population of just over 500. The school's name is frequently referred to as "SHHS".

== Phoebe Prince bullying incident ==
Having moved in 2009 to South Hadley from Ireland, Phoebe Prince was taunted and bullied for several weeks by at least two groups of students at South Hadley High School, following disputes with two girls in late December 2009. On January 14, 2010, three students engaged in persistent taunting and harassment of Prince. Prince subsequently died by suicide by hanging herself in the family apartment. After her death, many crude comments about her were posted on her Facebook memorial page, most of which were removed.

Other parents subsequently stated that bullying of their children had been completely ignored by the school administration. Massachusetts state lawmakers sped up efforts to pass anti-bullying legislation as a result.

On March 29, 2010, two male and four female teenagers from South Hadley High School were indicted as adults on felony charges stemming from the incident, ranging from statutory rape, criminal harassment, stalking, juvenile delinquency, to assault with a deadly weapon.

The district attorney directly contradicted claims by the school superintendent that school officials had been unaware of the bullying:

Contrary to previously published reports, Phoebe's harassment was common knowledge to most of the South Hadley High School student body. The investigation has revealed that certain faculty, staff and administrators of the high school also were alerted to the harassment of Phoebe Prince before her death. Prior to Phoebe's death, her mother spoke with at least two school staff members about the harassment Phoebe had reported to her ... the actions or inactions of some adults at the school are troublesome.

In May 2011, the case was resolved, after agreements to plead guilty to lesser charges. Five of the defendants were placed on probation, with several also sentenced to community service. The charges against a male student were dropped at the request of the Prince family. Prince's mother settled with the town of South Hadley in October 2010, in which she agreed not to sue or reveal details of the settlement.

== Academics ==
South Hadley High School offers instruction across ten academic departments: Career and Technical Education, English, Fine and Applied Arts, World Languages, Mathematics, Science, Social Studies, Health and Physical Education, School Counseling, and Special Education. The school's mission emphasizes critical thinking, creative problem solving, and practical application of skills. Student academic organizations include the National Honor Society, Math Team, Mock Trial Team, Debate Club, and Model United Nations. The school library is named the Elliott B. Lyman Library.

== Athletics ==
South Hadley competes as the Tigers in the Massachusetts Interscholastic Athletic Association (MIAA). The girls basketball program won the school's first state championship in 2026, capturing the Division 4 title with a 49-38 victory over Frontier Regional School on March 15 at the Tsongas Center in Lowell, after back-to-back state final appearances in 2024 and 2025. Athletic facilities include a football field with artificial turf and Landers Diamond baseball field.

== Student life ==
South Hadley High School offers a variety of extracurricular activities and clubs. Student organizations include the Student Council, National Honor Society, Best Buddies, Gender and Sexuality Alliance, Multicultural Appreciation Club, Environmental Awareness Club, and Model United Nations, among others. The performing arts program includes Harlequins theater, band, and music. The student newspaper is the Spotlight, the yearbook is Gateway, and the school produces a television program called Tiger Times.

== History ==
South Hadley High School was established in 1870. For much of its early history, the school shared a building on the town common with South Hadley's town hall, operating out of that combined facility from approximately 1913 until 1956. In 1956, the school relocated to its current building at 153 Newton Street. The original building continues to serve as South Hadley's town hall.

== Campus ==
South Hadley High School is located at 153 Newton Street in South Hadley, Massachusetts. The campus includes the Elliott B. Lyman Library, a football field with artificial turf, and Landers Diamond baseball field.

== Student body ==
As of the 2024-25 school year, South Hadley High School enrolls approximately 479 students in grades 9 through 12, with a student-to-teacher ratio of approximately 8.5:1, well below the Massachusetts state average of 12:1. Approximately 33.7% of students qualify for free or reduced-price lunch. The racial and ethnic composition of the student body is approximately 74.9% White, 18.2% Hispanic, 2.7% African American, 1.5% Asian, and 1.7% multiracial.

== Academic performance ==
South Hadley High School has a four-year graduation rate of approximately 93%. In state assessments, approximately 52% of students met proficiency standards in mathematics, above the Massachusetts state average of 42%, while approximately 49% met standards in English Language Arts, at par with the state average. Among college-bound students, the average SAT score is 1250 and the average ACT score is 30. Approximately 28% of students are enrolled in Advanced Placement courses.

== Rankings ==
According to SchoolDigger, South Hadley High School ranks 147th out of 349 Massachusetts public high schools, placing it in the top 58% statewide as of 2025. The school has improved over time, rising from the 47th percentile in 2015 to the 58th percentile in 2025. Niche ranks the school 15th for STEM education among high schools in the Springfield area, and 120th for athletics among Massachusetts high schools.

== Notable alumni ==
- Arthur Whittemore, Justice of the Massachusetts Supreme Judicial Court from 1955 to 1969.
- Don Abbey, college football player
- A. Bartlett Giamatti, president of Yale University and commissioner of Major League Baseball
