= Fernande R. V. Duffly =

American judge

Fernande R. V. Duffy

Associate Justice of the Massachusetts Supreme Judicial Court
- In office February 1, 2011 – July 12, 2016
- Appointed by: Deval Patrick
- Preceded by: Roderick L. Ireland
- Succeeded by: Kimberly S. Budd

Personal details
- Born: December 10, 1949 (age 76) Indonesia
- Education: University of Connecticut; Harvard University

Fernande R. V. Duffly (born December 10, 1949) is an American lawyer and jurist from Massachusetts. She was appointed by Governor Deval Patrick in December 2010 to serve as an associate justice of the Massachusetts Supreme Judicial Court. Patrick nominated her following the elevation of Roderick L. Ireland as Chief Justice on the court. Her nomination was confirmed 4-3 (with one recusal) by the Governor's Council on January 26, 2011. She was sworn in on February 1, 2011. She is the first Asian American to serve on the court. She retired on July 12, 2016.

Duffly received her B.A. from the University of Connecticut in 1973 (with Highest Honors, Phi Beta Kappa, Phi Kappa Phi) and her J.D. degree from Harvard Law School, where she was executive director of the Harvard Legal Aid Bureau in 1977–1978. After law school, she joined the Boston law firm Warner and Stackpole. She continued to work as an attorney until her nomination to the Probate and Family Court division of the Massachusetts trial Court in December 1991; she was later appointed to the Massachusetts Appeals Court.

She lives in Cambridge, Massachusetts.

== See also ==
- List of Asian American jurists

Legal offices
Preceded by Roderick L. Ireland	Associate Justice of the Massachusetts Supreme Judicial Court; 2011–2016	Succeeded by Kimberly S. Budd
