= Felicia Lamport =

American poet and satirist (1916–1999)

Felicia Lamport (1916 – 23 December 1999), was an American poet and satirist who also wrote a column for The Boston Globe called "Muse of the Week in Review". She was known for her inventive use of the pun.

== Life and work ==
Lamport was born in Manhattan in New York City in 1916, daughter of Samuel C. Lamport and Miriam (née Dworsky). She graduated from Vassar College in Poughkeepsie in 1937, after which she began her career as a reporter for the New York Journal and spent several years as a subtitle writer for MGM films.

Her first book, Mink on Weekdays (Ermine on Sunday), published in 1950, was a memoir of her early life growing up in a rich New York Jewish family. It made the best-seller list in The New York Times for one week. It was followed by three poetry collections: Scrap Irony (1961), Cultural Slag (1966), Light Metres (1982), and Political Plumlines (1984), the first three of which were illustrated by Edward Gorey. Lamport's Globe column first appeared 1981 but her work also appeared in The New Yorker, The Atlantic Monthly, Harper's, McCall's, The Saturday Evening Post, The New Republic and other publications.

In 1942 she married Benjamin Kaplan (April 11, 1911 – August 18, 2010) an American copyright scholar who was to become a justice in the Supreme Judicial Court of Massachusetts. Kaplan was notable as being "one of the principal architects" of the Nuremberg trials.

She was particularly remembered for The Love Song of R. Milhous Nixon, in which she borrowed from T. S. Eliot's poem with a similar title to lampoon the President, at the height of the 1973 Watergate scandal in 1973. The poem began:

Let us go then, in my plane,
For a weekend of repose in Key Biscayne;
When the view beneath our eyes appears unstable
Let us banish all incipient defeats
In one of my retreats.

Lamport was described by author Abbott Gleason, who lodged with the family at 2 Bond Street as "by the standards of the late 50s ultra-liberal. Lamport was a noted host and raconteur and Gleason later recalled one day meeting Alger Hiss over Sunday lunch at the house. In 1961 Time magazine enthusiastically reviewed her book Scap Irony: "The pun also rises. Too much maligned as the lowest form of humor, it can soar for a brief moment. And in good hands, words can be made to jump, molt, wiggle, shrink, flash, collide, fight, strut, and turn themselves inside out or upside down." Her literary style has been compared to that of Ogden Nash. Lamport's obituary in The New York Times mentioned William Safire's description of her as "'the leading muse of the Deprefixers,' which he defined as poets who achieve effects by dropping prefixes, for lines like 'Men often pursue in suitable style/ The imical girl with the scrutable smile.'"

Lamport was well known in Cambridge and beyond for her wit. She was also loved by students in her writing classes at Harvard University and at the Harvard Extension School. In 2001 a set of her papers, including play scripts, articles, verse and other writings, correspondence and teaching materials, was donated to the Arthur and Elizabeth Schlesinger Library on the History of Women in America at the Radcliffe Institute for Advanced Study, Harvard University. She was a keen chess player and served as a director of the American Chess Foundation.

She and Kaplan entertained guests at both their Bond Street home and on Martha's Vineyard where they summered for many years. Her friend Robert Manning, former editor of the Atlantic Monthly, said Lamport "suffered fools politely, but not gladly. Having Felicia as a friend protected you from enemies on all sides. She was so loyal, in addition to being so entertaining and ingenious."

Lamport died on 23 December 1999, of pneumonia, at her home in Cambridge, Massachusetts at the age of 83. She was survived by her husband, two children and four grandchildren.

== Selected works ==
- Mink on Weekdays (Ermine on Sunday), (1951) Victor Gollancz Ltd
- Scrap Irony (A Tribute to Vassar College on the Occasion of Its Centennial) (1961), Houghton Mifflin, (illustrated by Edward Gorey)
- Cultural Slag (1966), Victor Gollancz Ltd, (illustrated by Edward Gorey)
- Light Metres (1982), Everest House, (illustrated by Edward Gorey) ISBN 0-89696-090-0
- Political Plumlines (1984), Doubleday, (illustrated by Bill Sanders)
