= Kimberly S. Budd =

American judge (born 1966)

Kimberly Budd
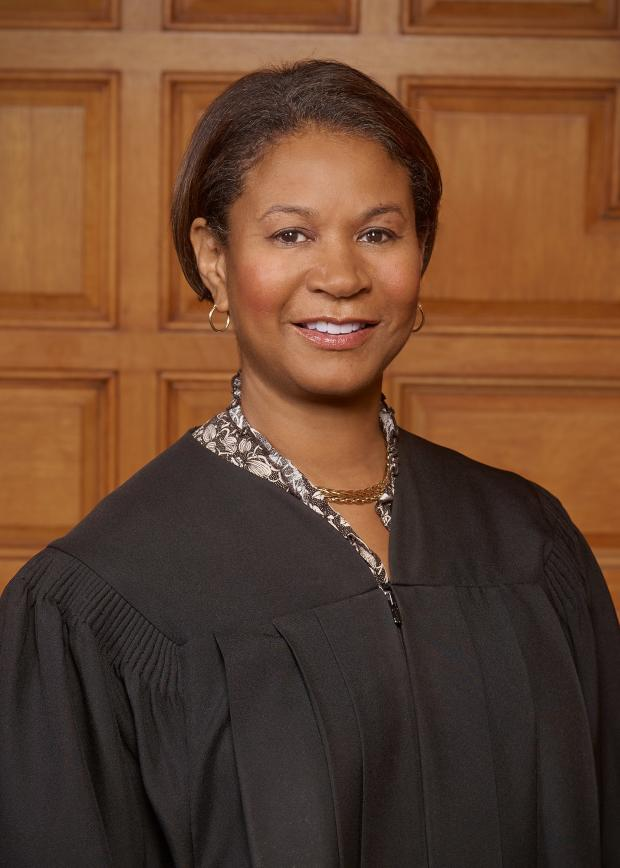

27th Chief Justice of the Massachusetts Supreme Judicial Court
- Incumbent
- Assumed office December 1, 2020
- Appointed by: Charlie Baker
- Preceded by: Barbara Lenk (acting)

Associate Justice of the Massachusetts Supreme Judicial Court
- In office August 24, 2016 – December 1, 2020
- Appointed by: Charlie Baker
- Preceded by: Fernande R. V. Duffly
- Succeeded by: Serge Georges Jr.

Personal details
- Born: October 23, 1966 (age 59)
- Relatives: Wayne Budd (father)
- Education: Georgetown University (BA); Harvard University (JD)

Kimberly S. Budd (born October 23, 1966) is the chief justice of the Supreme Judicial Court of Massachusetts and former justice of the Massachusetts Superior Court.

== Early life, education and legal career ==
Budd was born on October 23, 1966, to former U.S. attorney for the District of Massachusetts Wayne Budd. Budd primarily grew up in Peabody, Massachusetts. She attended Peabody Veterans Memorial High School, but graduated high school in Atlanta after her family moved before the start of her senior year in 1983.

Budd received a Bachelor of Arts degree in English from Georgetown University, graduating magna cum laude in 1988, and a Juris Doctor degree from Harvard Law School in 1991. She began her legal career as a law clerk to Chief Justice Joseph P. Warner of the Massachusetts Appeals Court in 1991. She was a litigation associate at Mintz, Levin, Cohn, Ferris, Glovsky and Popeo before serving as an Assistant United States Attorney in the United States Attorney's Office for the District of Massachusetts. After that, she was a university attorney for Harvard University in the General Counsel's Office. She later served as Director of the Community Values program at Harvard Business School. Budd received an Honorary Doctor of Law from the University of Massachusetts Amherst on May 15, 2026. Budd teaches in MCLE and Bar Association programs, is a former adjunct instructor at New England Law, and has taught trial advocacy at Harvard Law School.

== Judicial career ==
Budd was previously an Associate Justice for the Massachusetts Superior Court. She was nominated to the court by Governor Deval Patrick in July 2009 and began active service in September 2009. She was nominated to the seat formerly held by Ralph D. Gants.

=== Massachusetts Supreme Judicial Court ===
She was nominated to the court by Governor Charlie Baker on June 14, 2016, and confirmed by the Governor's Council on August 10, 2016. She assumed office on August 24, 2016, and was ceremonially sworn in on November 21, 2016.

In May 2017, Budd wrote for the unanimous court when it found that the federal Americans with Disabilities Act required the Massachusetts parole board to make reasonable accommodations when considering whether to grant parole to a murderer with traumatic brain injury.

On October 28, 2020, Governor Charlie Baker nominated Justice Budd to assume the role of Chief Justice of the Supreme Judicial Court. Justice Budd has been nominated to fill the Chief Justice vacancy after the death of former Chief Justice Justice Ralph Gants in September 2020. On November 18, 2020, she was unanimously confirmed by the Governor's Council. Budd became the first female, African-American Chief Justice of the Massachusetts Supreme Judicial Court upon her swearing in.

== Personal life ==
She is married with two sons. Her father is Wayne Budd, senior counsel at Goodwin Procter and a former United States Attorney.

Legal offices
Preceded by Fernande R. V. Duffly	Associate Justice of the Massachusetts Supreme Judicial Court; 2016–2020	Succeeded by Serge Georges Jr.
Preceded by Barbara Lenk; Acting	Chief Justice of the Massachusetts Supreme Judicial Court; 2020–present	Incumbent
