= Charles Fried =

American judge (1935–2024)

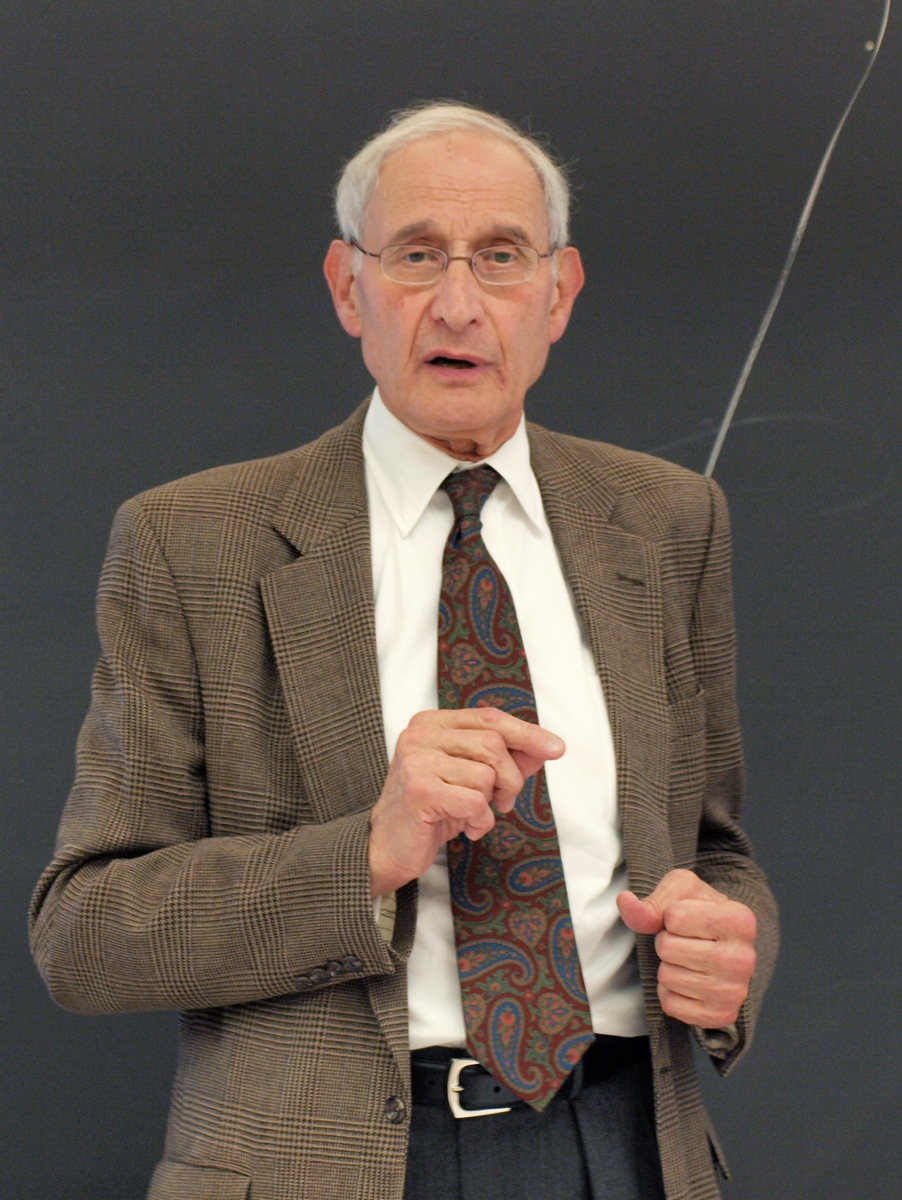
- Fried in 2009

Associate Justice of the Massachusetts Supreme Judicial Court
- In office September 1995 – June 1999
- Appointed by: William Weld
- Preceded by: Joseph R. Nolan
- Succeeded by: Judith Cowin

38th Solicitor General of the United States
- In office June 1, 1985 – January 20, 1989; Acting: June 1, 1985 – October 23, 1985
- President: Ronald Reagan
- Preceded by: Rex E. Lee
- Succeeded by: Ken Starr

Personal details
- Born: Karl Fried; April 15, 1935 Prague, Czechoslovakia
- Died: January 23, 2024 (aged 88) Cambridge, Massachusetts, U.S.
- Party: Republican
- Spouse: Anne Summerscale
- Children: 2
- Education: Princeton University (AB); University of Oxford (BA, MPhil); Columbia University (LLB)

Charles Anthony Fried (born Karel Fried; April 15, 1935 – January 23, 2024) was an American jurist and lawyer. He served as Solicitor General of the United States under President Ronald Reagan from 1985 to 1989. He was a professor at Harvard Law School and a visiting professor at Columbia Law School. He also served on the board of the nonpartisan, nonprofit, Campaign Legal Center.

Fried was the author of more than ten books and over 30 journal articles, and his work appeared in over a dozen collections.

== Early life and education ==
Fried was born on April 15, 1935, in Prague, Czechoslovakia, to Marta and Anthony Fried. They were a Jewish family. His father was a Czech industrialist who served as a vice-president of the arms and automotive conglomerate Škoda Works. Fried described him as a "Czech patriot" and the family as having "always looked to the United States and to American democracy for inspiration".

Before the German invasion of Czechoslovakia, the Frieds fled Czechoslovakia in 1939. They lived briefly in England before moving in 1941 to New York, where Fried earned American citizenship in 1948 at the age of thirteen. The family settled in New York City.

After graduating from the Lawrenceville School in 1952, Fried attended Princeton University, where he was a member of Phi Beta Kappa and received an A.B. in modern languages and literature in 1956 after completing a senior thesis titled "The Phedre of Racine: An Analysis of the Play's Artistry." Fried then attended the University of Oxford, where he earned a Bachelor of Arts and Master of Arts degree in jurisprudence in 1958 and 1960, respectively, and was awarded the Ordronnaux Prize in Law (1958). In 1961, Fried received his Bachelor of Laws (LL.B.) degree from Columbia Law School, where he was an editor of the Columbia Law Review and a Stone Scholar. From 1960 to 1961, he served as law clerk to United States Supreme Court justice John Marshall Harlan II. In 1961, he began teaching at Harvard Law School.

== Legal career ==
Fried argued 25 cases in front of the Supreme Court during his tenure as Solicitor General. He served as counsel to numerous major law firms and clients, arguing several major cases, one of the most notable being Daubert v. Merrell Dow Pharmaceuticals, both in the Supreme Court and in the Ninth Circuit on remand.

Prior to his appointment as Solicitor General, Fried was Special Assistant to the Attorney General of the United States from 1984 to 1985, which was preceded by a consulting relationship to that office. He also held advisory roles with the Department of Transportation from 1981 to 1983 and President Ronald Reagan (1982). In October 1985, Reagan appointed Fried as Solicitor General of the United States. Fried had previously served as Deputy Solicitor General and Acting Solicitor General. As Solicitor General, he represented the Reagan Administration before the Supreme Court in 25 cases. In 1989, when Reagan left office, Fried returned to Harvard Law School.

Fried was appointed associate justice of the Supreme Judicial Court of Massachusetts in 1995 by his former student, Governor Bill Weld, and served in that role until June 1999,. During this time, he also taught constitutional law at Harvard Law School as a Distinguished Lecturer. Prior to joining the court, Fried held the chair of Carter Professor of General Jurisprudence at Harvard Law School. He returned to Harvard Law School in July 1999 as a full-time member of the faculty and Beneficial Professor of Law. He served on the Harvard Law School faculty from 1961 until his retirement in December 2023, teaching courses on appellate advocacy, commercial law, constitutional law, contracts, criminal law, federal courts, labor law, torts, legal philosophy, and medical ethics.

Fried published extensively. He was the author of more than ten books and over 30 journal articles. His work also appeared in over a dozen collections. Unusually for a law professor without a graduate degree in philosophy, he published significant work in moral and political theory only indirectly related to the law; Right and Wrong, for instance is a general statement of a Kantian position in ethics with affinities with the work of Thomas Nagel, John Rawls, and Robert Nozick. On September 27, 2010, he and Gregory Fried discussed their book Because It Is Wrong: Torture, Privacy, and Presidential Power in the Age of Terror at the American Academy of Arts and Sciences. Fried was Orgain Lecturer at the University of Texas (1982), Tanner Lecturer on Human Values at Stanford University (1981), and Harris Lecturer on Medical Ethics at the Harvard Medical School (1974–75). He was conferred a Guggenheim Fellowship in 1971–72. He was a member of the National Academy of Sciences's Institute of Medicine, the American Academy of Arts and Sciences, and the American Law Institute.

== Politics and affiliations ==
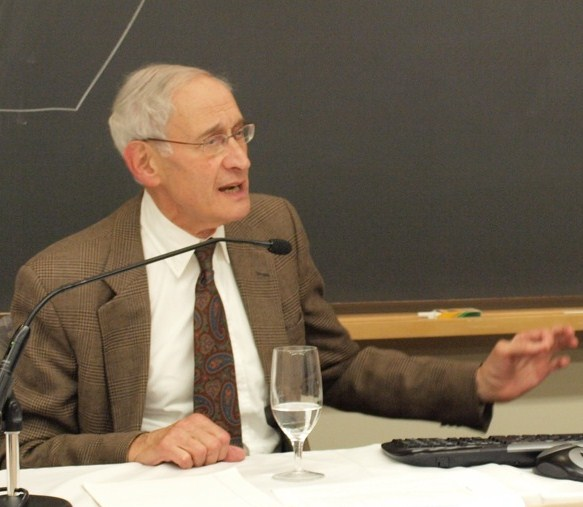
Fried speaking at Harvard Law School in 2009

In September 2005, Fried testified before the Senate Judiciary Committee in support of the nomination of John Roberts to become Chief Justice of the United States. After the nomination of Samuel Alito to the U.S. Supreme Court, Fried praised Alito as an outstanding judge but dismissed claims that Alito is radical, saying, "He is conservative, yes, but he is not radically conservative like Scalia." Fried testified before the Senate Judiciary Committee and wrote a New York Times op-ed in support of Alito, who had served under him in the Solicitor General's office.

On October 24, 2008, despite his previous support for the presidential aspirations of Senator John McCain, Fried announced that he had voted for Senator Barack Obama for president by absentee ballot. Fried cited McCain's selection of Governor of Alaska Sarah Palin as his running mate as the principal reason for his decision to vote for Obama. As president of the Harvard Law Review in 1990, Obama had published an article Fried wrote criticizing the effects of race-based affirmative action. Fried later told The Wall Street Journal:

I admire Senator McCain and was glad to help in his campaign, and to be listed as doing so; but when I concluded that I must vote for Obama for the reason stated in my letter, I felt it wrong to appear to be recommending to others a vote that I was not prepared to cast myself. So it was more of an erasure than a public affirmation—although obviously my vote meant that I thought that Obama was preferable to McCain–Palin. I do not consider abstention a proper option.

In February 2011, Fried testified before the Senate Judiciary Committee in support of the Patient Protection and Affordable Care Act. When asked by Illinois Senator Richard Durbin to respond to critics of the law's individual mandate who ask: "[I]f the government can require me to buy health insurance, can it require me to have a membership in a gym, or eat vegetables?," Fried replied:

Yes. We hear that quite a lot. It was put by Judge Vinson, and I think it was put by Professor Barnett in terms of eating your vegetables, and for reasons I set out in my testimony, that would be a violation of the 5th and the 14th Amendment, to force you to eat something. But to force you to pay for something? I don't see why not. It may not be a good idea, but I don't see why it's unconstitutional.

Fried was an adviser to the Harvard chapter of the Federalist Society.

Having supported Jon Huntsman for the Republican nomination in 2012 and John Kasich for the Republican nomination in 2016, Fried opposed the election of Donald Trump and voted for Hillary Clinton. He endorsed Joe Biden's presidential candidacy in 2020.

While working for the Reagan administration Fried argued that the case Roe v. Wade should be overturned in Webster v. Reproductive Health Services. In an op-ed for The New York Times in 2021, Fried said that Roe should not be overturned, believing that 1992 case Planned Parenthood v. Casey put Roe on firmer constitutional grounds.

== Personal life ==
Fried married Anne Summerscale, an art history scholar, in 1959. They remained married for 65 years until his death. Together, they had two children: Gregory and Antonia.

Fried died on January 23, 2024, at his home in Cambridge, Massachusetts. He was 88 years old.

== Works ==
- Because It Is Wrong: Torture, Privacy and Presidential Power in the Age of Terror, by Charles Fried and Gregory Fried (2010, W. W. Norton)
- Modern Liberty and the Limits of Government (2006) (Trad. esp.: La libertad moderna y los límites del gobierno, Buenos Aires/Madrid, Katz editores S.A, 2009, ISBN 978-84-96859-60-9)
- Saying What the Law Is: The Constitution in the Supreme Court (2004)
- Making Tort Law: What Should Be Done and Who Should Do It (with David Rosenberg; 2003)
- Order and Law: Arguing the Reagan Revolution – A Firsthand Account (1991)
- Contract as Promise: A Theory of Contractual Obligation (2nd edition, 2015)
- Right and wrong. Harvard University Press. 1978. ISBN 9780674769052. OL 4548229M.
- Medical Experimentation: Personal Integrity and Social Policy (2nd edition, 2016), ISBN 9780190602727
- An Anatomy of Values: Problems of Personal and Social Choice (1970)

== See also ==
- Daubert standard
- List of law clerks for the ninth seat of the Supreme Court of the United States

Legal offices
Preceded by Rex Lee	Solicitor General of the United States; 1985–1989	Succeeded by William Bryson; Acting
Preceded by Joseph Nolan	Associate Justice of the Massachusetts Supreme Judicial Court; 1995–1999	Succeeded by Judith Cowin
