= Joseph R. Nolan =

American judge

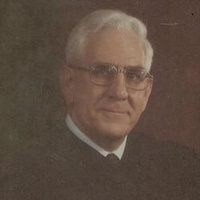

Associate Justice of the Massachusetts Supreme Judicial Court
- In office 1981–1995
- Appointed by: Edward J. King
- Preceded by: Francis J. Quirico
- Succeeded by: Charles Fried

Associate Justice of the Massachusetts Appeals Court
- In office 1980–1981
- Appointed by: Edward J. King
- Preceded by: Edmund V. Keville
- Succeeded by: Kent B. Smith

Associate Justice of the Massachusetts Superior Court
- In office 1978–1980
- Appointed by: Edward J. King

Special Justice for the Brighton District of the Boston Municipal Court
- In office 1973–1978
- Appointed by: Francis W. Sargent

Personal details
- Born: Joseph Richard Nolan; June 14, 1925 Mattapan, Boston, Massachusetts, U.S.
- Died: April 23, 2013 (aged 87) Brighton, Massachusetts, U.S.
- Spouse: Margaret Kelly (m. 1947-2013)
- Children: 7
- Education: Boston College (BS, LLB)

Military service
- Branch/service: United States Navy
- Rank: Pharmacist's Mate Third Class
- Battles/wars: World War II

Joseph Richard Nolan (June 14, 1925 – April 23, 2013) was an American jurist.

== Early life and education ==
He was born in the Mattapan neighborhood of Boston, Massachusetts. He was the younger of two sons whose father was a school custodian and whose mother cleaned houses. He graduated from Boston College High School in 1942. He would later graduate from Boston College with a Bachelor of Science degree in 1950 and from Boston College Law School with a Bachelor of Laws degree in 1954.

== Military service ==
He served in the United States Navy during World War II reaching the rank of Pharmacist's Mate Third Class. He served in the Pacific Theater.

== Legal & academic career ==
He started his legal career in private practice and later became an assistant district attorney for Suffolk County. He served as the general counsel for the Massachusetts Lottery Commission. From 1965 to 2011 he was a professor of law at Suffolk University Law School.

== Judicial career ==
From 1973 to 1978 he was a special justice for the Brighton District of the Boston Municipal Court. From 1978 to 1980 he was a judge on the Massachusetts Superior Court. From 1980 to 1981 he was an associate justice on the Massachusetts Appeals Court. From 1981 to 1995 he was an associate justice on the Massachusetts Supreme Judicial Court. He retired from judicial service in 1995.

== Later life ==
He served as President of the Catholic Lawyers Guild from 1995 until his death in 2013.

== Personal life ==
He married Margaret M. “Peggy” Kelly in 1947. They had seven children. She died in 2014.

== Death ==
He died on April 23, 2013, in St. Elizabeth‟s Medical Center in Brighton from complications of a broken hip he suffered a couple days prior.
