= Robert J. Cordy =

American judge

Associate Justice of the Massachusetts Supreme Judicial Court
- In office February 1, 2001 – August 12, 2016
- Appointed by: Paul Cellucci
- Preceded by: Herbert P. Wilkins
- Succeeded by: David A. Lowy

Personal details
- Born: May 18, 1949 (age 77) Manchester, Connecticut, United States
- Children: 4
- Education: Dartmouth College; Harvard Law School
- Occupation: Attorney, judge

Robert J. Cordy (born May 18, 1949) is an American lawyer and judge who is a former Associate Justice of the Massachusetts Supreme Judicial Court from 2001 to 2016.

== Biography ==
Cordy graduated from Dartmouth College in 1971 and Harvard Law School in 1974. After graduation, Cordy served as a defense attorney on the Massachusetts Defenders Committee. From 1978 to 1979, he served as a Special Assistant Attorney General in the Department of Revenue, and then in 1979 he became an Associate General Council on the State Ethics Commission. In 1982, Cordy was appointed as a federal prosecutor and eventually became Chief of the Public Corruption Unit.

From 1987 to 1991, he was a partner at Burns & Levinson. From 1991 to 1993, he served as Chief Legal Counsel to Governor William Weld. In 1993, Cordy became a partner at McDermott Will & Emery, working there until his appointment to the Supreme Judicial Court on February 1, 2001. In July 2016, Cordy wrote for the unanimous court when it upheld the manslaughter indictment of a teenage girl for text messages that caused the death of Conrad Roy. He retired from the Court on August 12, 2016 to return to private practice.

Legal offices
Preceded by Ruth Abrams	Associate Justice of the Massachusetts Supreme Judicial Court; 2001–2016	Succeeded by David A. Lowy
