= Martha B. Sosman =

American judge (1950–2007)

Associate Justice of the Massachusetts Supreme Judicial Court
- In office September 6, 2000 – March 10, 2007
- Appointed by: Paul Cellucci
- Preceded by: Neil L. Lynch
- Succeeded by: Margot Botsford

Personal details
- Born: October 20, 1950 Boston, Massachusetts, U.S.
- Died: March 10, 2007 (aged 56)
- Cause of death: Respiratory failure
- Education: Middlebury College; University of Michigan

Martha B. Sosman (October 20, 1950 – March 10, 2007) was an American lawyer and jurist from Massachusetts. She was appointed by Governor Paul Cellucci and served as an associate justice of the Massachusetts Supreme Judicial Court from 2000 until her death.

Sosman was born in Boston in 1950 and grew up in Concord. Sosman graduated from Concord-Carlisle Regional High School in 1968, from Middlebury College cum laude in 1972, and from the University of Michigan Law School magna cum laude in 1979. Sosman worked as an attorney with Foley, Hoag & Eliot in Boston from 1979 to 1984 before becoming an assistant United States attorney for two years. Following this, Sosman was chief of the Civil Division at the U.S. Attorney's Office for the District of Massachusetts in Boston, serving from 1986 to 1989. In 1989, Sosman left government service to become a founder of Kern, Sosman, Hagerty, Roach & Carpenter, P.C. with three other assistant U.S. attorneys. This was the first all-woman law firm in Massachusetts.

Sosman became an associate justice of the Massachusetts Superior Court in 1993, and was recruited for the bench by Justice Robert J. Cordy of the Massachusetts Supreme Judicial Court. Governor Paul Cellucci nominated Sosman to the Massachusetts Supreme Judicial Court on September 6, 2000 at the age of 49.

Sosman was one of three justices to dissent in the Goodridge v. Department of Public Health case, which legalized same-sex marriage in Massachusetts.

On July 20, 2004, Sosman was outed as a closeted lesbian by Fox News personality Bill O'Reilly. He pointed out that Sosman, dissented in the Goodridge case.

In April 2005, Sosman was diagnosed with breast cancer. She died of respiratory failure nearly two years later. Governor Deval Patrick appointed Margot Botsford as Sosman's successor on July 26, 2007.

Legal offices
| Preceded by Neil L. Lynch | Associate Justice of the Massachusetts Supreme Judicial Court; September 6, 2000 – March 10, 2007 | Succeeded by Margot Botsford |
