= Dalila Argaez Wendlandt =

American judge (born 1968 or 1969)

Dalila Wendlandt
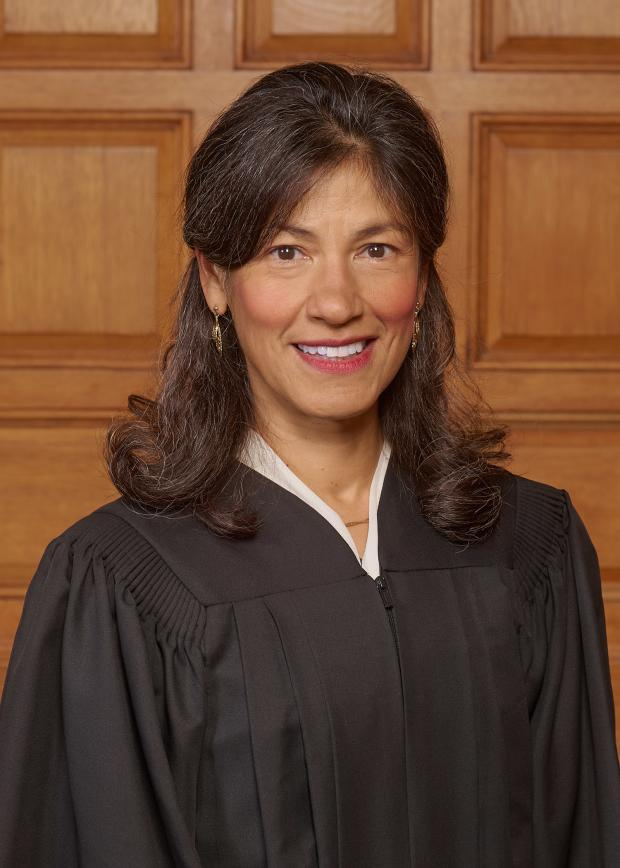

Associate Justice of the Massachusetts Supreme Judicial Court
- Incumbent
- Assumed office December 4, 2020
- Appointed by: Charlie Baker
- Preceded by: Barbara Lenk

Personal details
- Born: October 1969 (age 56) New Orleans, Louisiana, U.S.
- Education: University of Illinois, Urbana-Champaign (BS); Massachusetts Institute of Technology (MS); Stanford University (JD)

Dalila Argaez Wendlandt (born October 1969) is an American lawyer who has served as an associate justice of the Massachusetts Supreme Judicial Court since 2020. She previously served as an associate justice of the Massachusetts Appeals Court from 2017 to 2020.

== Early life and education ==
Wendlandt was born in New Orleans, the daughter of Colombian immigrants. She received a Bachelor of Science in Mechanical Engineering from the University of Illinois at Urbana–Champaign in 1991 and a Master of Science in mechanical engineering from the Massachusetts Institute of Technology in 1993 and her Juris Doctor with high honors from Stanford Law School in 1996, where she was an editor of the Stanford Law Review.

== Legal career ==
After graduating law school, she served as a law clerk for Judge John M. Walker Jr. of the United States Court of Appeals for the Second Circuit. In 1997, she joined the law firm Ropes & Gray, where she focused on electro-mechanical devices and controls algorithms, regarding patent and trade secret misappropriation litigation, eventually becoming a partner.

== Judicial career ==
=== Massachusetts Court of Appeals ===
Wendlandt was appointed to the Massachusetts Appeals Court in 2017 to fill the vacancy left by the elevation of Judge Elspeth B. Cypher to the Supreme Judicial Court. She officially joined the court on July 7, 2017. Her service on the appeals terminated upon being sworn in as an associate justice of the Massachusetts Supreme Judicial Court. She was succeeded by Justice Rachel Hershfang.

=== Massachusetts Supreme Judicial Court ===
On November 20, 2020, Governor Charlie Baker nominated Wendlandt to be an associate justice of the Massachusetts Supreme Judicial Court to the seat vacated by Barbara Lenk who retired on December 1, 2020. On November 25, 2020, she was unanimously confirmed by the Governor's Council. She was sworn into office on December 4, 2020. She is the first Latina to serve on the Massachusetts Supreme Judicial Court.

== See also ==
- List of Hispanic and Latino American jurists

Legal offices
Preceded by Barbara Lenk	Associate Justice of the Massachusetts Supreme Judicial Court; 2020–present	Incumbent
