= Gabrielle Wolohojian =

American judge (born 1960)

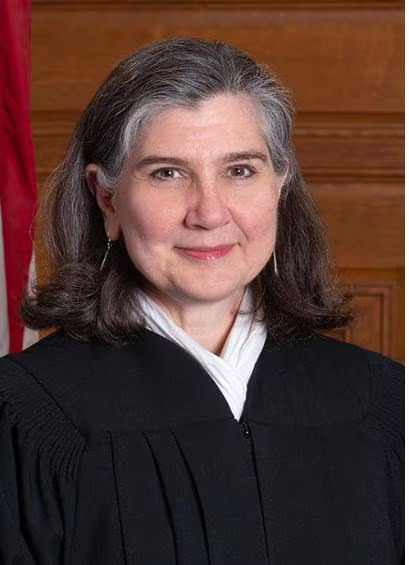

Associate Justice of the Massachusetts Supreme Judicial Court
- Incumbent
- Assumed office April 22, 2024
- Appointed by: Maura Healey
- Preceded by: David A. Lowy

Personal details
- Born: December 16, 1960 (age 65)
- Education: Rutgers University (BA); Hertford College, Oxford (DPhil); Columbia University (JD)

Gabrielle R. Wolohojian (born December 16, 1960) is an American lawyer who serves as an associate justice of the Massachusetts Supreme Judicial Court. She previously served as an associate justice of the Massachusetts Appeals Court.

== Early life and career ==
Wolohojian was born in New York, the granddaughter of Armenian immigrants. Wolohojian graduated from Rutgers University in 1982, where she majored in English. She earned a D.Phil. in English language and literature from Hertford College, Oxford in 1987. She graduated from Columbia Law School with a Juris Doctor in 1989, where she served as an editor of the Columbia Law Review. After graduating from law school, she clerked for Judge Rya W. Zobel of the United States District Court for the District of Massachusetts and Judge Bailey Aldrich of the United States Court of Appeals for the First Circuit. She then entered private practice, joining the firm that would become WilmerHale in 1991, where she was elected a partner in 1997 and continued until 2008.

In 1994, Wolohojian left private practice for 16 months to serve as an associate independent counsel on the investigation of Jim Guy Tucker, the former governor of Arkansas. She worked under Independent Counsel Robert B. Fiske.

== Judicial career ==
On November 14, 2007, Governor Deval Patrick nominated Wolohojian to the appeals court to fill the seat left vacant by the retirement of Associate Justice Kenneth Laurence. After being confirmed by the Governor's Council, she took the oath of office on February 7, 2008. On February 7, 2024, Governor Maura Healey nominated her to serve as an associate justice on the Massachusetts Supreme Judicial Court. She was confirmed by the Governor's Council on February 28, 2024.

== Personal life ==
Wolohojian had a romantic relationship from 2007–2019 with Maura Healey, who has served as the governor of Massachusetts since 2023.

As of 2022, she performs with the Boston Civic Symphony.

Legal offices
Preceded by David A. Lowy	Associate Justice of the Massachusetts Supreme Judicial Court; 2024–present	Incumbent
