= Massachusetts Appeals Court =

Appellate court in Massachusetts, US

Coordinates: 42.359343°N 71.061160°W

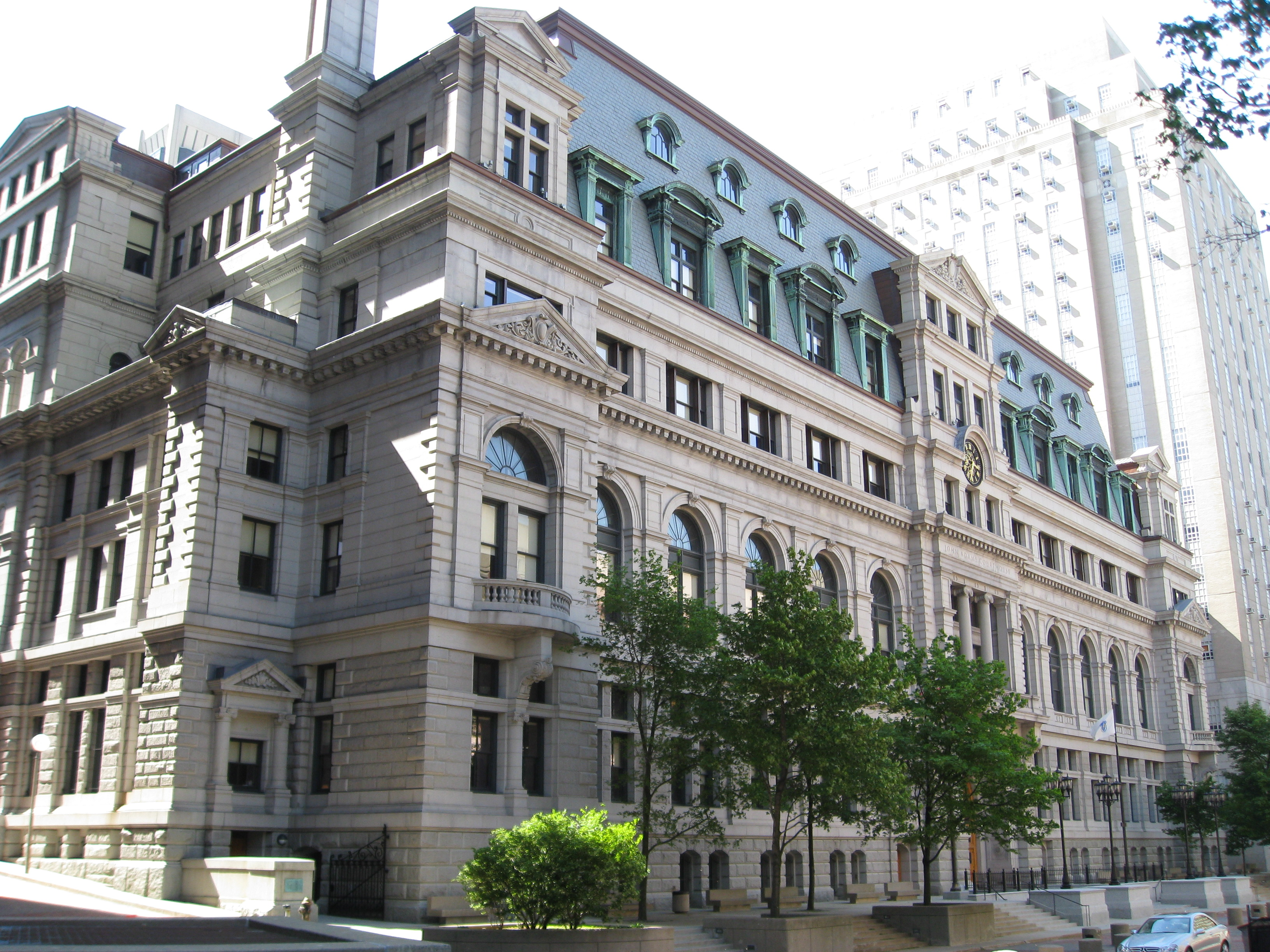
The Appeals Court is located in the John Adams Courthouse

The Massachusetts Appeals Court is the intermediate appellate court of Massachusetts. It was created in 1972 as a court of general appellate jurisdiction. The court is located at the John Adams Courthouse at Pemberton Square in Boston, the same building which houses the Supreme Judicial Court and the Social Law Library.

== Jurisdiction ==
The Appeals Court hears most appeals from the seven court departments of the Massachusetts Trial Court, including the Superior, District, Probate and Family, Juvenile, Land, Housing, and Boston Municipal Court departments. The Appeals Court also hears appeals from final decisions of certain Massachusetts administrative agencies, including the Department of Industrial Accidents, the Appellate Tax Board, and the Commonwealth Employment Relations Board.

Some types of appeals are not heard before the Appeals Court. For example, an appeal from a conviction of first degree murder goes directly to the Supreme Judicial Court. The Supreme Judicial Court can also elect to bypass review by the Appeals Court and hear a case on "direct appellate review." In the District Court Department, appeals in certain civil cases are made first to the Appellate Division of the District Court before being eligible for appeal to the Appeals Court. After a decision by the Appeals Court, a party may seek "further appellate review" by requesting review by the Supreme Judicial Court.

== Proceedings ==
The Appeals Court usually hears cases in three-judge panels, which rotate so that every judge has an opportunity to sit with every other judge. In addition to its panel sittings, the Appeals Court runs a continuous "single justice" session, with a separate docket. The single justice may review interlocutory orders and orders for injunctive relief issued by certain Trial Court departments, as well as requests for review of summary process appeal bonds, certain attorney's fee awards, motions for stays (postponement) of civil proceedings or criminal sentences pending appeal, and motions to review impoundment orders. Each associate justice sits as single justice for a month at a time. Appeals are heard from September through July at the John Adams Courthouse as well as at special sessions held at various locations such as law schools throughout Massachusetts.

== Justices ==
Twenty-five justices sit on the Appeals Court: one chief justice and twenty-four associate justices. The most recent chief justice of the Appeals Court was Mark V. Green.

If a Massachusetts appellate justice (that is, a justice of either the Appeals Court or of the Supreme Judicial Court) attains age 70 and retires, that justice may be recalled to active service on the Appeals Court as needed. Currently, no recall justices are serving.

The court's current members, listed by seniority, are as follows:

Name	Start	Appointer	Law School
Amy Blake, Chief Justice	2014 (Note: Took office as chief justice in November 2024)	Maura Healey (D) (Note: Originally appointed as an associate justice by Deval Patrick (D))	New England
Ariane Vuono	2006	Mitt Romney (R)	Connecticut
William Meade	2006	Mitt Romney (R)	Western New England
Peter Rubin	2008	Deval Patrick (D)	Harvard
Gregory Massing	2014	Deval Patrick (D)	Virginia
Eric Neyman	2015	Charlie Baker (R)	Boston University
Vickie Henry	2015	Charlie Baker (R)	Boston University
Kenneth Desmond	2016	Charlie Baker (R)	Boston College
Peter Sacks	2016	Charlie Baker (R)	Harvard
Sookyoung Shin	2016	Charlie Baker (R)	Harvard
Joseph Ditkoff	2017	Charlie Baker (R)	Harvard
Sabita Singh	2017	Charlie Baker (R)	Boston University
John Englander	2017	Charlie Baker (R)	Boston University
Kathryn Hand	2019	Charlie Baker (R)	Boston College
Marguerite Grant	2020	Charlie Baker (R)	Stanford
Maureen Walsh	2021	Charlie Baker (R)	Western New England
Rachel Hershfang	2021	Charlie Baker (R)	Yale
Robert Brennan	2022	Charlie Baker (R)	Boston University
Andrew D'Angelo	2022	Charlie Baker (R)	Suffolk
Paul Smyth	2022	Charlie Baker (R)	Virginia
Christopher Hodgens	2022	Charlie Baker (R)	New England
Robert Toone	2023	Maura Healey (D)	Yale
Gloria Tan	2024	Maura Healey (D)	Yale
Chauncy Wood	2024	Maura Healey (D)	Boston University
Jennifer Allen	2025	Maura Healey (D)	Boston College

=== Former justices ===
- Peter W. Agnes Jr., associate justice, 2011–2020
- Christopher J. Armstrong, associate justice, 1972–2000, chief justice, 2000–2006, recall justice, 2006–2008. One of the original six justices of the court, fourth Chief Justice and the longest serving of the original members.
- Susan S. Beck, associate justice, 1997–2006. One of the most scholarly members of the court, came to the court after a lengthy career in public service, was so dedicated to her work that she was known to sleep on the couch in her chambers and was dedicated to fostering collegiality and joy among her colleagues.
- Janis M. Berry, associate justice, 2001–2016.
- Frederick L. Brown, associate justice, 1976–2003, recall justice, 2003–2015. First African-American appointed to an appellate court in Massachusetts, served nearly 40 years on the Appeals Court.
- Judd J. Carhart, associate justice, 2010–2017.
- Cynthia J. Cohen, associate justice, 2001–2017
- William I. Cowin, associate justice, 2001–2008.
- R. Ammi Cutter, recall justice, 1980–1990. At the age of 78, Justice Cutter was recalled to the Appeals Court after sixteen years on the SJC. Renowned and influential jurist.
- Elspeth B. Cypher, associate justice, 2001–2017. Elevated to the Supreme Judicial Court of Massachusetts.
- Gordon Doerfer, associate justice, 2001–2007.
- Raya Dreben, associate justice, 1979–1997, recall justice, 1997–2011 Second woman appointed to the court. was a mentor to 11 justices on Appeals Court
- Francis R. Fecteau, associate justice, 2008–2015.
- Edith W. Fine, associate justice, 1984–1995. Third woman appointed to the court after Charlotte Peretta and Raya Dreben. Served in a wide variety of positions before coming to the court, ranging from SJC Law Clerk to ACLU-Maryland Staff Attorney to Assistant Corporation Counsel in Boston. In addition to her jurisprudence, steered reformation of the judicial process in the Commonwealth.
- J. Harold Flannery, associate justice, 1995–1998
- Andre Gelinas, associate justice, 1999–2008.
- Gerald Gillerman, associate justice, 1990–1994, recall justice, 1994–2002. Purple Heart Winner who became a lawyer after having a severely damaged leg, worked to make law comprehensible to all.
- Reuben Goodman, 1972–1982. One of the original six appointees in 1972, formerly served as the chief appellate public defender in the Commonwealth and was a special advisor to ACLU founder Roger Baldwin in Korea.
- Malcolm Graham, associate justice, 2004–2015.
- Andrew R. Grainger, associate justice, 2006–2017.
- Donald Grant, associate justice, 1972–1988. One of the original six appointees in 1972, came to the court as an Appellate expert, and, in addition to outstanding jurisprudential contributions, innovated internal procedures that helped establish the court in its own right.
- Joseph Grasso, associate justice, 2001–2015
- John Greaney, associate justice, 1978–1984, chief justice, 1984–1989. Second Chief Justice of the Appeals Court after Allan Hale.
- Mark V. Green, associate justice 2001–2017, chief justice 2017–2024.
- Mel Greenberg, associate justice, 1990–2007. Worcester native, former legal director of the Civil Liberties Union of Massachusetts, served on the District and Superior Courts, now an appellate advocate.
- Allan M. Hale, chief justice, 1972–1984, recall justice, 1984. First Chief Justice of the court.
- Sydney Hanlon, associate justice, 2009–2020
- George Jacobs, associate justice, 1989–2003.
- Scott L. Kafker, associate justice, 2001–2015, chief justice, 2015–2017. Elevated to Supreme Judicial Court of Massachusetts.
- R. Marc Kantrowitz, associate justice, 2001–2015.
- Benjamin Kaplan, recall justice, 1983–1991, 1993–2005. Worked on United States v. One Book Called Ulysses, served as a Nuremberg prosecutor, professor at Harvard Law (and authority on civil procedure), justice of the Supreme Judicial Court, and, subsequently, a long-serving recall justice on the Appeals Court.
- Rudolph Kass, associate justice, 1979–2000, recall justice, 2000–2003. One of the most prolific, soundest and most colorful writers on the court and is still active as a mediator.
- Gary Stephen Katzmann, associate justice, 2004–2016. Served on the Appeals Court until his appointment as a judge on the United States Court of International Trade.
- Edmund Kelville, associate justice, 1972–1979. One of the original six appointees along with Allan Hale, David Rose, Reuben Goodman, Donald Grant, and Christopher Armstrong.
- C. Jeffrey Kinder, associate justice, 2015–2022.
- Kenneth Laurence, associate justice, 1990–2007.
- James R. Lemire, associate justice, 2016–2022.
- John Mason, associate justice, 2001–2004.
- Edward J. McDonough, associate justice, 2017–2020
- James F. McHugh, associate justice, 2001–2012.
- James Milkey, associate justice 2009–2024
- David A. Mills, associate justice, 2001–2012.
- Joseph R. Nolan, associate justice, 1980–1981.
- Charlotte Anne Perretta, associate justice, 1978–2009. First woman appointed to the Appeals Court, served as senior associate justice from 2003 to 2009.
- Elizabeth Porada, associate justice, 1990–2003, recall justice 2003–2004.
- Francis J. Quirico, recall justice, 1986–1987. After 13 years as a trial judge and 12 on the SJC, Justice Quirico sat on recall with the Appeals Court from 1986 to 1987. Justice Quirico also was still a recall judge in the Superior Court until approximately 1990.
- Phillip Rapoza, associate justice, 1998–2006, chief justice, 2006–2015.
- David A. Rose, associate justice, 1972–1976, recall justice, 1978–1985.
- Mitchell J. Sikora, Jr. associate justice, 2006–2014
- Kent B. Smith, associate justice, 1981–1997, recall justice, 1997–2012. First attorney appointed to serve indigent criminal defendants in Western Massachusetts, authored the authoritative treatise on criminal practice and procedure in the Commonwealth. Still was serving actively on recall at the time of his death.
- Mary Thomas Sullivan, associate justice, 2011-2023.
- Joseph A. Trainor, associate justice, 2001–2018
- Dalila Argaez Wendlandt, associate justice, 2017–2020, elevated to the Supreme Judicial Court in 2020.
- Gabrielle Wolohojian, associate justice 2008–2024, elevated to the Supreme Judicial Court in 2024.

The following justices have been elevated from the Appeals Court to the Supreme Judicial Court

- Justice Elspeth B. Cypher, associate justice, 2001–2017, elevated to the Supreme Judicial Court in 2017.
- Justice Fernande R.V. Duffly, associate justice, 2000–2011, elevated to the Supreme Judicial Court in 2011.
- Chief Justice John Greaney, associate justice, 1978–1984, chief justice, 1984–1989, elevated to the Supreme Judicial Court in 1989.
- Justice Geraldine Hines, associate justice, 2013–2014, elevated to the Supreme Judicial Court in 2014.
- Justice Roderick L. Ireland, associate justice, 1990–1997, elevated to the Supreme Judicial Court in 1997, later elevated to Chief Justice of the SJC in 2010.
- Chief Justice Scott L. Kafker, associate justice, 2001–2015, chief justice, 2015–2017, elevated to the Supreme Judicial Court in 2017.
- Justice Barbara Lenk, associate justice, 1995–2011, elevated to the Supreme Judicial Court in 2011.
- Justice Joseph R. Nolan, associate justice, 1980–1981, elevated to the Supreme Judicial Court in 1981.
- Justice Francis X. Spina, associate justice, 1997–1999, elevated to the Supreme Judicial Court in 1999.
- Justice Dalila Argaez Wendlandt, associate justice, 2017–2020, elevated to the Supreme Judicial Court in 2020.
- Justice Gabrielle Wolohojian, associate justice 2008–2024, elevated to the Supreme Judicial Court in 2024.
