= Serge Georges Jr. =

American judge (born 1969 or 1970)

Serge Georges
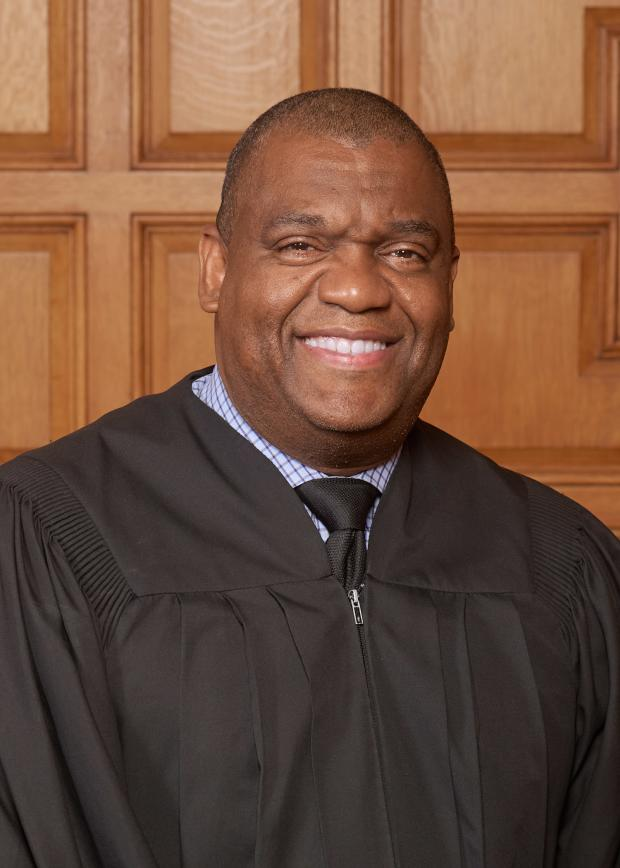

Associate Justice of the Massachusetts Supreme Judicial Court
- Incumbent
- Assumed office December 16, 2020
- Appointed by: Charlie Baker
- Preceded by: Kimberly S. Budd

Personal details
- Born: April 1970 (age 56)
- Education: Boston College (BA); Suffolk University (JD)

Serge Georges Jr. (born April 1970) is an American lawyer who has served as an associate justice of the Massachusetts Supreme Judicial Court. He previously served as a judge of the Boston Municipal Court from 2013 to 2020.

== Education ==
Georges is a first generation Haitian American. He earned his Bachelor of Arts from Boston College in 1992 and his Juris Doctor from the Suffolk University Law School in 1996. He was roommates with fellow judge Dan Cavarello at Boston College.

== Legal and academic career ==
Georges was a partner at Barron & Stadfeld, P.C., the Managing Director for Major, Lindsey & Africa, LLC, and an associate at both Todd & Weld and Rackemann, Sawyer & Brewster. He then went on to open his own solo practice. He has been an adjunct professor at Suffolk University Law School since 1999, where he teaches courses in Professional Responsibility, Evidence and Trial Advocacy. He also teaches trial advocacy at the University of Massachusetts School of Law.

== State judicial career ==
=== Boston Municipal Court service ===
He was nominated by Governor Deval Patrick to the Boston Municipal Court in 2013. He presided over the Dorchester Drug Court from 2014 to 2018.

=== Massachusetts Supreme Judicial Court ===
On November 17, 2020, Governor Charlie Baker nominated Georges to be an associate justice of the Supreme Judicial Court of Massachusetts to fill the vacancy left by Kimberly S. Budd who was elevated to be chief justice. On December 9, 2020, he was unanimously confirmed by the Massachusetts Governor's Council. He was sworn into office on December 16, 2020.

Legal offices
| Preceded by Kimberly S. Budd | Associate Justice of the Massachusetts Supreme Judicial Court; 2020–present | Incumbent |
