= Kenneth V. Desmond Jr. =

American judge

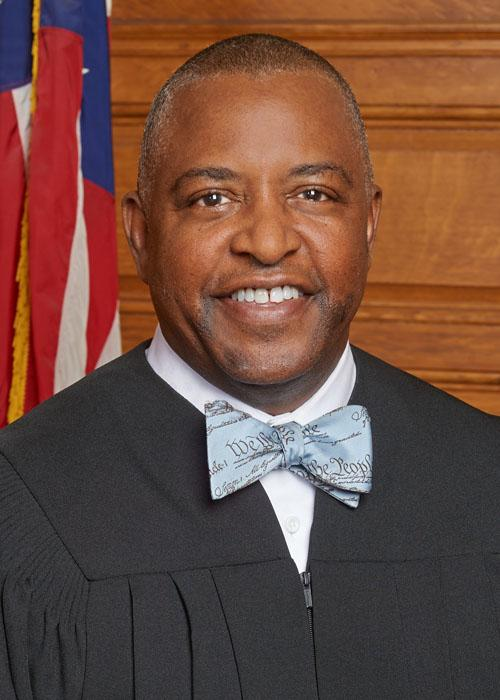

Associate Justice of the Massachusetts Appeals Court
- Incumbent
- Assumed office August 22, 2016
- Appointed by: Charlie Baker
- Preceded by: Gary Katzmann

Associate Justice of the Massachusetts Superior Court
- In office 2012 – August 22, 2016
- Appointed by: Deval Patrick

Personal details
- Born: Boston, Massachusetts, U.S.
- Education: Tufts University (B.A.); Boston College (J.D.)

Kenneth V. Desmond, Jr. (born 1963) is an associate justice of the Massachusetts Appeals Court.

== Early life and education ==
Born in Boston, Massachusetts in 1963, Desmond received his Bachelor of Arts from Tufts University in 1985. Upon graduation, he enrolled in a two-year management training program for now-defunct telecommunications company NYNEX. He then continued his education and received his Juris Doctor from Boston College Law School in 1990.

Following graduation, he served as an Assistant District Attorney of Suffolk County.

== Judicial service ==
After his service as an Assistant District Attorney, he became Deputy Chief Legal Counsel to the Middlesex County Sheriff's Department in 1997. During his tenure, he was appointed to the Boston Municipal Court by Governor Mitt Romney in 2005 and later became Presiding Justice of Dorchester Drug Court. After seven years of service within the Boston Municipal Court, Desmond was appointed as an associate justice of the Massachusetts Superior Court. While serving as an associate justice of the Massachusetts Superior Court, Desmond was further appointed to the Massachusetts Appeals Court by Governor Charles Baker in 2016 succeeding Justice Gary Stephen Katzmann.

Desmond has worked to advance racial equity within the Massachusetts Judicial System, including having previously served on the Board of the Massachusetts Black Lawyers Association and as Vice President of the Massachusetts Black Judges Conference.

== Publications ==
Kenneth V. Desmond Jr. has published an article, 'The Road to Race and Implicit Bias Eradication', where he has written about the need to recognize that implicit bias plays a substantial role in the judicial system and the steps needed to be taken in order to achieve racially equitable treatment in Massachusetts.
