= Francis X. Spina =

American judge

Francis X. Spina (born November 13, 1946) is a former Associate Justice of the Massachusetts Supreme Judicial Court.

== Biography ==
Justice Spina graduated from Amherst College and Boston College Law School. He worked for Western Massachusetts Legal Services and then as an Assistant City Solicitor in Pittsfield, Massachusetts from 1975 to 1977. From 1979 to 1983, he served as a Second Assistant District Attorney in Berkshire County. From 1983 to 1993, Justice Spina was a partner at Reder, Whalen, & Spina and then Katz, Lapointe and Spina. He was appointed to the Massachusetts Superior Court in 1993. In 1997, he was appointed to the Massachusetts Appeals Court, where he served until his appointment to the Massachusetts Supreme Judicial Court in 1999 by Governor Paul Cellucci. Spina retired from the court on August 12, 2016.

Legal offices
Preceded by Margaret H. Marshall	Associate Justice of the Massachusetts Supreme Judicial Court; 1999-2016	Succeeded by Frank Gaziano
