= Don Abbey =

American football player (born 1948)

Profile
- Position: Fullback

Personal information
- Born: May 19, 1948 (age 78); South Hadley, Massachusetts, U.S.
- Listed height: 6 ft 3 in (1.91 m)
- Listed weight: 241 lb (109 kg)

Career information
- High school: Deerfield Academy (Deerfield, Massachusetts)
- College: Penn State
- NFL draft: 1970: 7th round, 179th overall pick

Career history
- Montreal Alouettes (1971)*; Hartford Knights (1971); New York Stars (1974)*
- * Offseason or practice squad member only

Donald George Abbey (born May 19, 1948) is an American former football fullback. He played college football at Penn State University, and was selected by the Dallas Cowboys in the seventh round of the 1970 NFL draft.

== Early life ==
Abbey attended South Hadley High School. In 1963 as a junior running back, he contributed to the school's first unbeaten season as part of a team that posted an 8–0 record and outscored their opponents 238 to 12 points.

He moved on to play 2 more seasons at Deerfield Academy, where he was a fullback and middle linebacker. As a senior, he was named to the Boston Globe All-New England prep team.

== College career ==
Abbey accepted a football scholarship from Penn State University, as one of the last recruits of head coach Rip Engle. In 1967, he was named the starter at fullback, contributing to an 8-2-1 record under Joe Paterno, registering 386 rushing yards, 5 rushing touchdowns, 148 receiving yards, 4 receiving touchdowns and kicked 23 out 26 extra points, while leading the team in scoring and ranking fifth in the nation. He suffered a knee injury in the last practice before the 1967 Gator Bowl, which would limit him in the following seasons.

In 1968, he re-injured the knee and hurt an ankle in the season opener. He was passed on the depth chart by Tom Cherry, collecting 164 rushing yards and 3 touchdowns.

As a senior starter, his backup was Franco Harris and he tallied 228 rushing yards with 4 touchdowns. He was a part of the undefeated 1968 and 1969 teams that went 11-0 and won the Orange Bowl in both years. He finished his college career with 778 rushing yards (4.5-yard average), 12 rushing touchdowns and 4 receiving touchdowns.

== Professional career ==
Abbey was selected by the Dallas Cowboys in the seventh round (179th overall) of the 1970 NFL draft, with the intention of playing him at linebacker. Because of three previous knee surgeries that he had in college, he couldn't agree to a financial arrangement with the Cowboys.

In 1971, he was signed by the Montreal Alouettes of the Canadian Football League. He was waived on July 23.

On April 9, 1974, he signed with the New York Stars of the World Football League. He was released on June 26.
