= Neil L. Lynch =

American judge (1930–2014)

Neil Lawrence Lynch (June 26, 1930 – October 1, 2014) was a justice of the Massachusetts Supreme Judicial Court from 1981 to 2000. He was appointed by Governor Edward J. King.

Born in Bridgewater, Massachusetts, Lynch received an A.B. degree from Harvard University in 1952, and served in the United States Air Force during the Korean War. He received an LL.B. from Harvard Law School in 1957.

Lynch served as chief counsel to Governor Edward J. King from January 1979 to March 1981, when King nominated Lynch to a seat on the state supreme court vacated by the retirement of Justice Benjamin Kaplan. The appointment was described as being unusual in that it was "one of the few times a governor has named a close advisor to a top judicial post". Lynch chaired the court's Commission to Study Racial and Ethnic Bias in the Courts. Lynch served until he reached the mandatory retirement age of 70, on June 26, 2000.

Lynch died "after a long battle with cancer" at the age of 84.

Political offices
Preceded by Benjamin Kaplan	Justice of the Massachusetts Supreme Judicial Court; 1981–2000	Succeeded by Martha B. Sosman
