= Frank Gaziano =

American judge (born 1963)

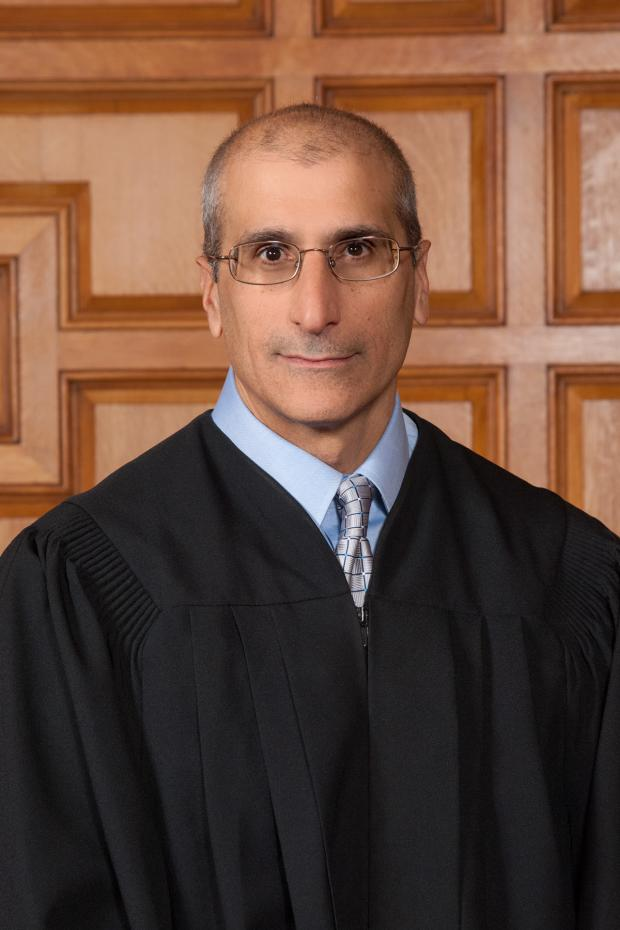

Associate Justice of the Massachusetts Supreme Judicial Court
- Incumbent
- Assumed office August 18, 2016
- Appointed by: Charlie Baker
- Preceded by: Francis X. Spina

Personal details
- Born: September 8, 1963 (age 61); Quincy, Massachusetts, U.S.
- Education: Lafayette College (BA); Suffolk University (JD)

Frank M. Gaziano (born September 8, 1963) is an associate justice of the Massachusetts Supreme Judicial Court.

== Early life and education ==
Born in Quincy, Massachusetts, Gaziano received his Bachelor of Arts from Lafayette College in 1986 and his Juris Doctor from Suffolk University Law School in 1989.

He began his legal career at the Boston law firm of Foley Hoag as a litigation associate. In 1991, he entered public service as an assistant district attorney with the Plymouth County District Attorney's Office in Brockton.

In 2001, he was appointed the First Assistant United States Attorney for the District of Massachusetts, where he was a member of the Organized Crime Strike Force.

== Judicial service ==
Gaziano was previously an associate justice for the Massachusetts Superior Court. He was nominated to the court by Governor Mitt Romney in 2004. He served as the Regional Administrative Justice for Plymouth County and for Criminal Business in Suffolk County. He also chaired the Supreme Judicial Court's Standing Committee on Criminal Rules and was a member of the Supreme Judicial Court's Model Homicide Jury Instruction Committee.

=== Supreme Judicial Court ===
Gaziano was nominated to the Supreme Judicial Court by Governor Charlie Baker on June 14, 2016, and confirmed by the Governor's Council on July 13, 2016. He succeeded Justice Francis X. Spina, who retired on August 12, 2016.

=== Notable cases ===
- In April 2020, Gaziano wrote for the unanimous court when it found that warrantless use of automatic number-plate recognition cameras to surveil a suspected heroin distributor's bridge crossings to Cape Cod was not an unconstitutional search because of the limited time and scope of the observations.
- In February 2022, the Supreme Judicial Court ruled that a criminal defendant lacked a reasonable expectation of privacy in a Snapchat story he shared with an undercover Boston police officer, who friended the defendant using a pseudonym and then used the clip to charge him in an illegal gun case. Writing for the court, Gaziano said that requiring police officers to always identify themselves would render "virtually all undercover work" unconstitutional.

Legal offices
Preceded by Francis X. Spina	Associate Justice of the Massachusetts Supreme Judicial Court; 2016–present	Incumbent
