= Ruth Abrams =

American judge (1930–2019)

Associate Justice of the Massachusetts Supreme Judicial Court
- In office 1978–2000
- Appointed by: Michael Dukakis
- Preceded by: Paul Reardon
- Succeeded by: Robert J. Cordy

Personal details
- Born: Ruth Ida Abrams; December 26, 1930 Boston, Massachusetts, U.S.
- Died: September 12, 2019 (aged 88) Boston, Massachusetts, U.S.
- Education: Radcliffe College; Harvard Law School

Ruth Ida Abrams (December 26, 1930 – September 12, 2019) was the first female justice of the Massachusetts Supreme Judicial Court, where she served from 1978 to 2000, and the first female appellate justice in Massachusetts.

Justice Abrams was a graduate of Radcliffe College's Class of 1953. She went on to graduate from Harvard Law School as one of approximately a dozen women in the Class of 1956. She was an assistant district attorney for Middlesex County, Massachusetts, where she helped prosecute Albert DeSalvo, the "Boston Strangler" and also served with the State Attorney General's Office. Justice Abrams also served as staff counsel to the Supreme Judicial Court of Massachusetts, and as a Superior Court Judge before then-Governor Michael Dukakis appointed her to the Supreme Judicial Court of Massachusetts in 1978, the first woman on the Court. It would be another 19 years before another woman was appointed a justice to the SJC. Serving with distinction, she retired from the court at the age of 70.

Among her notable decisions on the court were ones protecting the rights of pregnant women against discrimination in disability insurance, strengthening the rights of divorced women, and a pioneering grant of visitation rights after a breakup to a lesbian who had helped raise her partner’s son.

Abrams was born into a Jewish family with a strong legal tradition. Abrams is the daughter of Samuel Abrams, an attorney and Harvard Law School graduate who had the unique distinction of being the first man in America to be graduated from Harvard Law and have both a daughter and a son (George S. Abrams) who also were graduated from the law school. Her other sister was also a lawyer, she had an uncle who was a lawyer who had a son and son-in-law who were lawyers too.

Justice Abrams was noted for being a mentor to countless women attorneys, many of whom followed her to the bench. Margaret Marshall, the next female justice of the SJC and later its first female chief justice, cited her for encouraging her to apply for a judgeship.

In 1994, when rent control in Massachusetts was repealed, Abrams was living in a rent controlled apartment.

== See also ==
- List of female state supreme court justices
- List of Jewish American jurists

Legal offices
Preceded by Paul Reardon	Associate Justice of the Massachusetts Supreme Judicial Court; 1978–2000	Succeeded by Robert J. Cordy
