= Francis J. Quirico =

American judge (1911–1999)

Francis Joseph Quirico (February 18, 1911 – October 11, 1999) was a justice of the Massachusetts Supreme Judicial Court from 1969 to 1981.

== Early life, education, and military service ==
Born in Pittsfield, Massachusetts, as one of eight children of Luigi and Lucia Quirico, Italian immigrants, Quirico graduated from Pittsfield High School in 1928, and from Northeastern University School of Law, summa cum laude, in 1932. He served in the United States Army Air Corps for four years during World War II, attaining the rank of captain in the Air Transport Command.

== Legal career and judicial service ==
Quirico entered the practice of law in Pittsfield in 1933, also serving as Pittsfield city solicitor from 1948 to 1952, under Mayor Robert Capeless. On August 2, 1956, Governor Christian Herter appointed Quirico to a seat on the Massachusetts Superior Court Circuit vacated by the death of Judge Joseph Hurley.

On October 29, 1969, Governor Francis Sargent elevated Quirico to the state supreme court, making him the first person of Italian descent to serve on that court. Quirico's served until he reached the age of 70 in February 1981, that being the constitutional retirement age for state supreme court justices. After completing his judicial service, he taught as an adjunct at Suffolk University Law School. He served as a recall justice on the court of appeals from 1986 to 1987. The Berkshire County court complex was renamed the Francis Joseph Quirico Court Complex in his honor, in May 1998.

Quirico died at Berkshire Medical Center at the age of 88.

Political offices
Preceded by Arthur Whittemore	Justice of the Massachusetts Supreme Judicial Court; 1969–1981	Succeeded by Joseph R. Nolan
