= Massachusetts Supreme Judicial Court =

Highest court in the U.S. state of Massachusetts

Supreme Judicial Court of Massachusetts
- Seal with motto "Nulli vendemus, nulli negabimus aut differemus, rectum aut justitiam" (To no one will we sell, to no one deny or delay right or justice)
- Interactive map of Supreme Judicial Court of Massachusetts
- 42°21′32.75″N 71°3′40.5″W
- Established: 1692; 334 years ago
- Location: Boston, Massachusetts, U.S.
- Coordinates: 42°21′32.75″N 71°3′40.5″W
- Composition method: Executive appointments with quasi-legislative consent
- Authorised by: Massachusetts Constitution
- Appeals to: Supreme Court of the United States
- Judge term length: Mandatory retirement at 70 years of age
- Number of positions: 7
- Website: Official website

Chief Justice
- Currently: Kimberly S. Budd
- Since: December 1, 2020
- Lead position ends: October 23, 2036

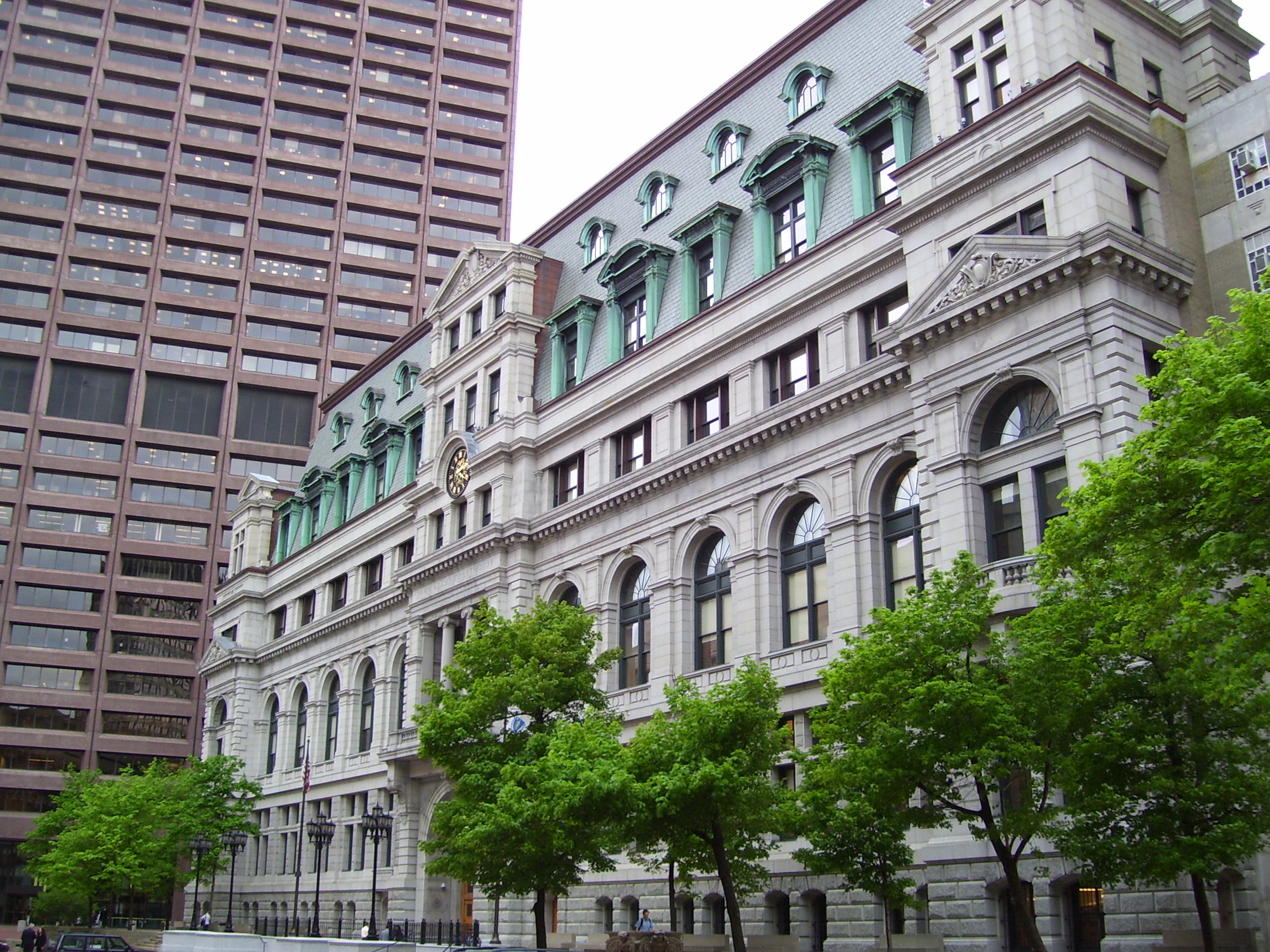
John Adams Courthouse, home to the SJC

The Massachusetts Supreme Judicial Court (SJC) is the highest court in the Commonwealth of Massachusetts. Although the claim is disputed by the Supreme Court of Pennsylvania, the SJC claims the distinction of being the oldest continuously functioning appellate court in the Americas, with a recognized history dating to the establishment of the Massachusetts Superior Court of Judicature in 1692 under the charter of the Province of Massachusetts Bay. (Note: The Supreme Court of Pennsylvania disputes this, claiming to be eight years older.)

Although it was historically composed of four associate justices and one chief justice, the court is currently composed of six associate justices and one chief justice. Like the State of Maine, Massachusetts prefixes the name of its highest court with 'Judicial' to avoid confusion with the Massachusetts General Court, the state's legislature.

The Legislature created the Massachusetts Court of Appeals in 1972, building the modern formation of the Massachusetts state court system. The three-tiered judiciary structure is composed of the Supreme Judicial Court, the Massachusetts Court of Appeals, and trial courts. The court is known to interpret the Massachusetts Constitution to offer more protection of civil liberties when compared with other courts across the country.

The court does not have final jurisdiction for federal cases due to the Supremacy Clause, meaning they must follow the United States Supreme Court rulings when state laws conflict with federal laws or the U.S. Constitution.

== History ==
The Massachusetts Supreme Judicial Court traces its history back to the high court of the British Province of Massachusetts Bay, which was chartered in 1692. Under the terms of that charter, Governor Sir William Phips established the Superior Court of Judicature as the province's local court of last resort (some of the court's decisions could be appealed to courts in England). When the Massachusetts State Constitution was established in 1780, legislative and judicial records show that the state's high court, although renamed, was a continuation of provincial high court. During and after the period of the American Revolution the court had members who were appointed by royal governors, the executive council of the Massachusetts Provincial Congress (which acted as the state's executive from 1775 to 1780), and governors elected under the state constitution.

== Nomination process ==
The Massachusetts Supreme Judicial Court utilizes direct gubernatorial appointment for the nomination of justices. The Judicial Nominating Council is a volunteer body consisting primarily of attorneys that provides a list of potential judicial applicants to the governor, ensuring that the appointments are qualified and non-partisan. Additionally, a committee of representatives from the Boston Bar Association and the Massachusetts Bar Association provides their judgment and recommendations on the nominees. Then, the nominees are recommended to the Governor's Council for approval.

== Location and citation ==
The SJC sits at the John Adams Courthouse, One Pemberton Square, Boston, Massachusetts 02108, which also houses the Massachusetts Appeals Court and the Social Law Library. The legal citation for the Massachusetts Supreme Judicial Court is "Mass."

== Unconventional judicial powers ==
The Massachusetts Supreme Judicial Court also has an unusual role of providing advisory opinions that support the act of judicial review, although this power is often regarded as weak by lawmakers. Judicial review is a check on the other branches of state government by the judicial branch to determine the constitutionality of executive or legislative acts that was established by Marbury v. Madison. The Court is able to declare acts of the other two branches as unconstitutional upon the request of the governor or legislature, allowing the court to protect its authority through this quasi-legislative power. This ability makes the court more involved in the legislative process and influences the relationships between the Court and the other two branches of state government.

== Landmark cases ==
- Rex v. Preston (1770) – Captain Thomas Preston, the Officer of the Day during the Boston Massacre, was acquitted when the jury was unable to determine whether he had ordered the troops to fire. The defense counsel in the case was a young attorney named John Adams, later the second President of the United States.
- Rex v. Wemms, et al. (1770) – Six soldiers involved in the Boston Massacre were found not guilty, and two more – the only two proven to have fired – were found guilty of manslaughter.
- Commonwealth v. Nathaniel Jennison (1783) – The Court declared slavery unconstitutional in the state of Massachusetts by allowing slaves to sue their masters for freedom. Boston lawyer, and member of the Massachusetts Constitutional Convention of 1779, John Lowell, upon the adoption of Article I for inclusion in the Massachusetts Constitution, exclaimed: "I will render my services as a lawyer gratis to any slave suing for his freedom if it is withheld from him ..." With this case, he fulfilled his promise. Slavery in Massachusetts was denied legal standing.
- Commonwealth v. Hunt (1842) – The Court established that trade unions were not necessarily criminal or conspiring organizations if they did not advocate violence or illegal activities in their attempts to gain recognition through striking. This legalized the existence of non-socialist or non-violent trade organizations, though trade unions would continue to be harassed legally through anti-trust suits and injunctions.
- Roberts v. Boston (1850) – The Court established the "separate but equal" doctrine that would later be used in Plessy v. Ferguson by maintaining that the law gave school boards complete authority in assigning students to schools and that they could do so along racial lines if they deemed it appropriate.
- Commonwealth v. Nicola Sacco and Bartolomeo Vanzetti (1921) – The Court found two immigrants guilty of robbery and murder, in a trial that was later believed to be unfair. Global protests emerged, objecting to the ruling by the Court and promoting labor internationalism and justice for the working and immigrant classes.
- District Attorney for the Suffolk District v. Watson (1980) – The District Attorney for the Suffolk District sought a ruling regarding the constitutionality of Massachusetts' death penalty statute. The court ruled that the statute did, in fact, violate the Massachusetts Constitution, because it allowed for arbitrary and discriminatory use of the death penalty. As such, the statute could be regarded as cruel and unusual punishment and was ultimately struck down. The Court specifically was concerned about the unjust applications of this statue on marginalized communities. This case demonstrated the power of State Supreme Courts to utilize constitutional law to strike down specific capital punishments, contributing to nationwide efforts to revise death penalty laws.
- Goodridge v. Department of Public Health (2003) – The Court ruled 4–3 that the denial of marriage licenses to same-sex couples violated the Massachusetts Constitution. The decision was stayed for 180 days to allow the legislature time to amend the law to comply with the decision. In December 2003, the state Senate asked the SJC whether "civil unions" would comply with their ruling. The SJC replied that civil unions were insufficient, and civil marriage was required. The legislature made no further action, and the stay expired on May 17, 2004. The state began issuing marriage licenses to same-sex couples the same day. This decision was one of the first in the world to find that same-sex couples have a right to marry. Nineteen state courts referenced the Massachusetts SJC opinion when considering same-sex marriage regulations. The court's ruling allowed for more visibility of same-sex couples within the court system and significant developments in marriage laws.

== Composition ==
The Court consists of a Chief Justice and six Associate Justices appointed by the Governor of Massachusetts with the consent of the Governor's Council.

The Justices hold office until the mandatory retirement age of seventy, like all other Massachusetts judges since 1972.

=== Current composition ===
The current Chief Justice of the Massachusetts Supreme Judicial Court is Kimberly S. Budd, the first Black woman to serve as a chief justice on the Massachusetts Supreme Judicial Court. She succeeded Chief Justice Ralph Gants. In her nomination speech, she urged Governor Charles Baker Jr. to continue diversifying the court to better represent Massachusetts communities.

Name	Born	Start	Mandatory retirement	Appointer	Law school
Kimberly S. Budd, Chief Justice	October 23, 1966 (age 59)	August 24, 2016 (Note: Took office as Chief Justice on December 1, 2020 after being appointed by Governor Baker.)	2036	Charlie Baker (R)	Harvard
Frank Gaziano	September 8, 1963 (age 62)	August 18, 2016	2034	Charlie Baker (R)	Suffolk
Scott L. Kafker	April 24, 1959 (age 67)	August 21, 2017	2029	Charlie Baker (R)	Chicago
Dalila Argaez Wendlandt	October 1969 (age 56)	December 4, 2020	2039	Charlie Baker (R)	Stanford
Serge Georges Jr.	April 1970 (age 56)	December 16, 2020	2040	Charlie Baker (R)	Suffolk
Bessie Dewar	July 4, 1980 (age 46)	January 16, 2024	2050	Maura Healey (D)	Yale
Gabrielle Wolohojian	December 16, 1960 (age 65)	April 22, 2024	2030	Maura Healey (D)	Columbia

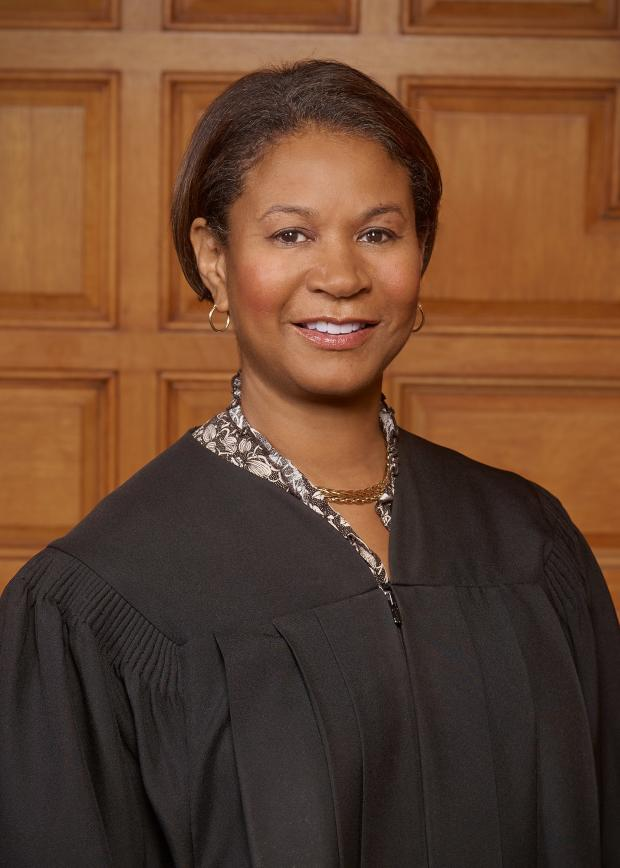
Chief Justice Kimberly S. Budd

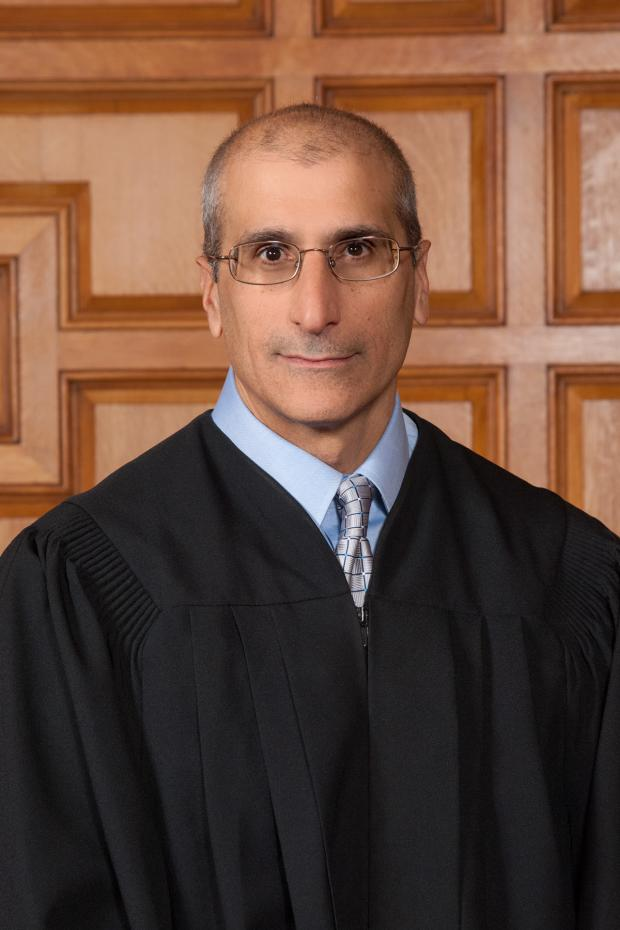
Associate Justice Frank Gaziano

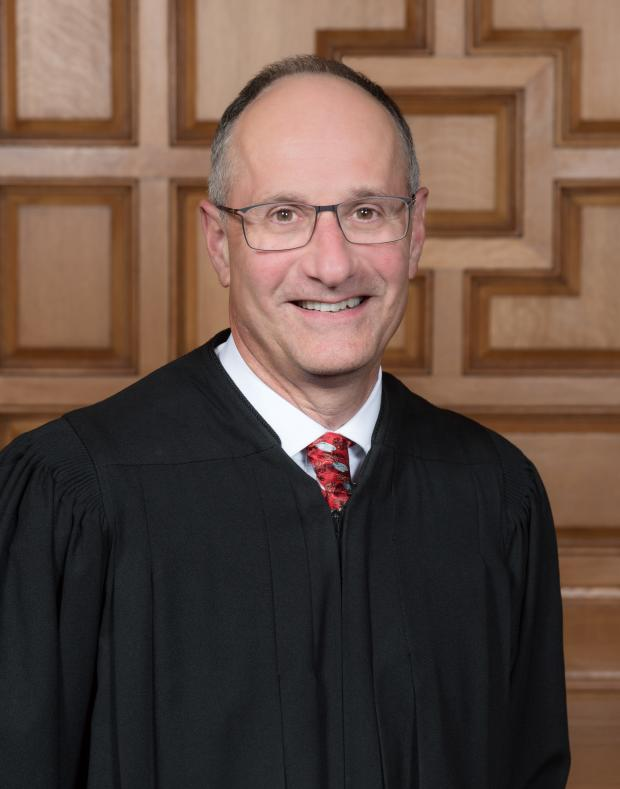
Associate Justice Scott L. Kafker

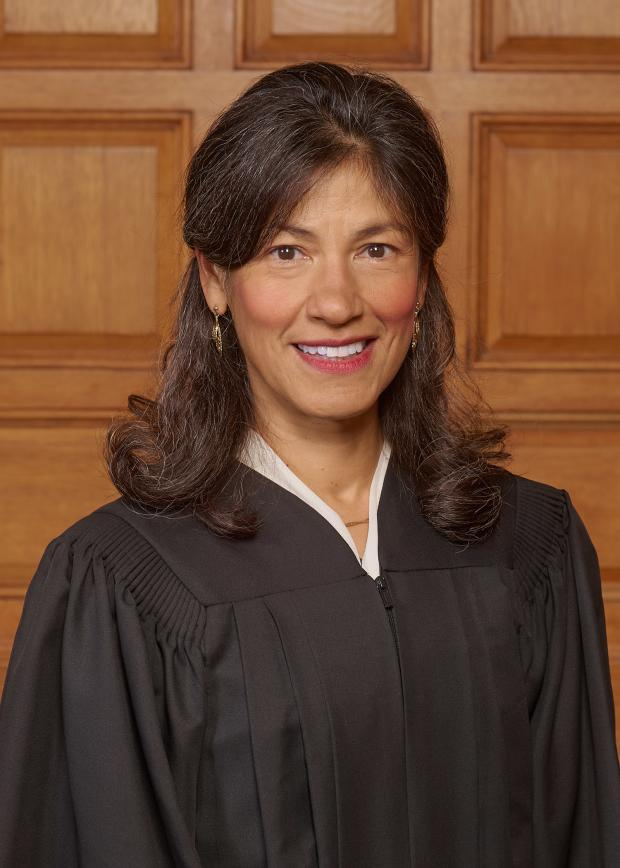
Associate Justice Dalila Argaez Wendlandt

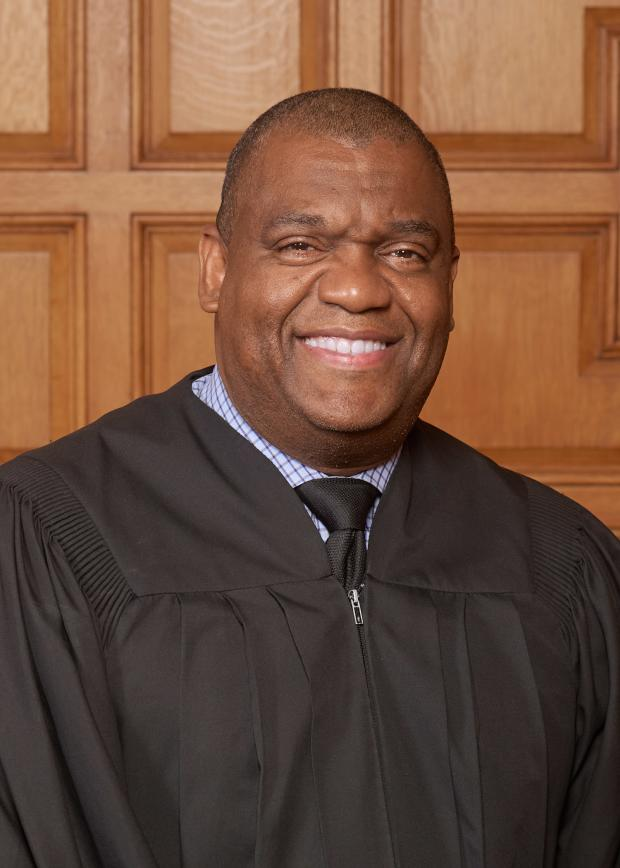
Associate Justice Serge Georges Jr.

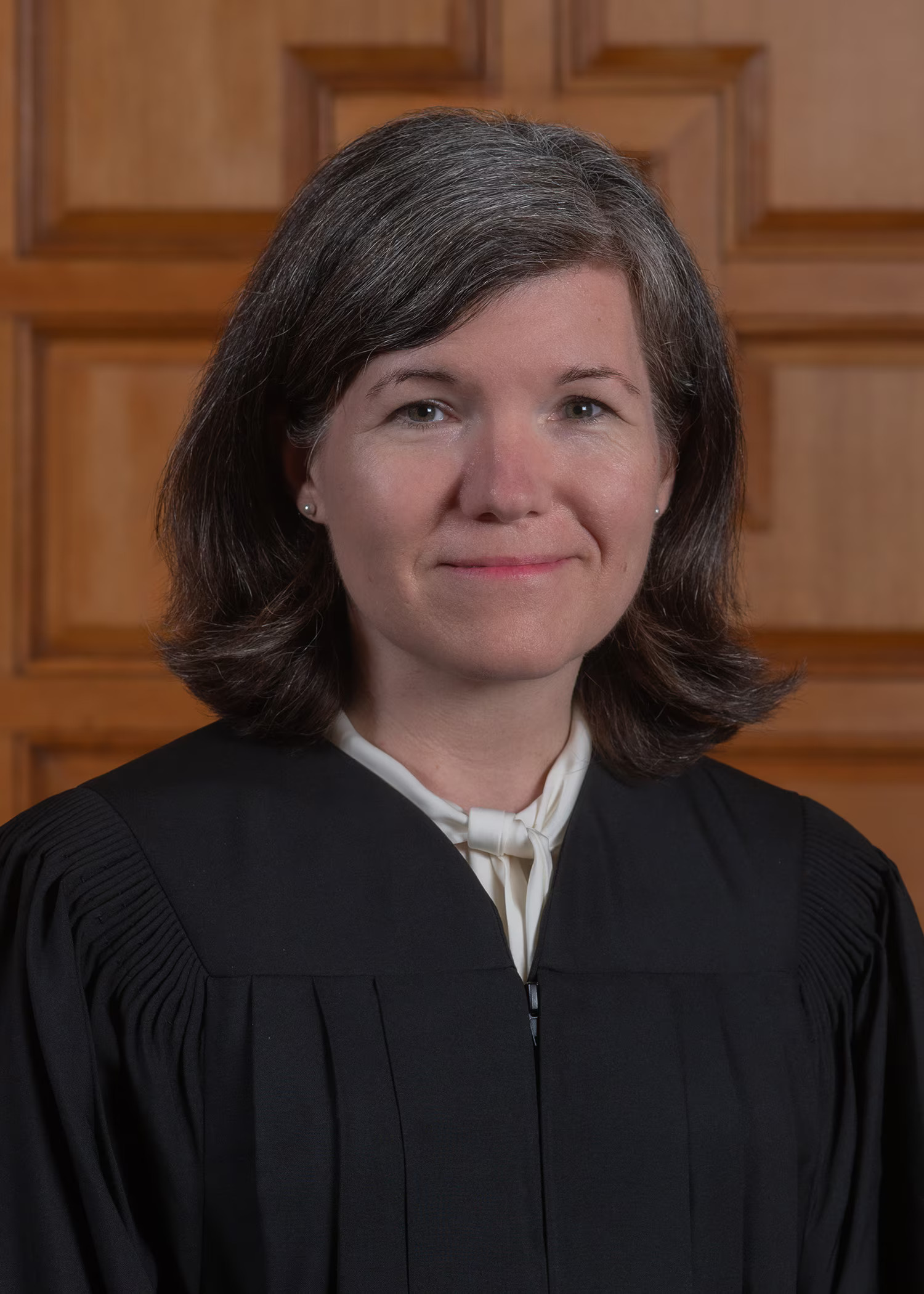
Associate Justice Bessie Dewar

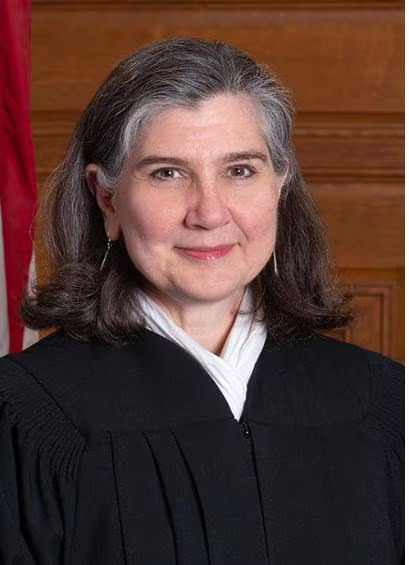
Associate Justice Gabrielle Wolohojian

=== Notable members ===
- William Cushing, Associate Justice of the Supreme Court of the United States (1790–1810)
- John Adams, 2nd President of the United States (1797-1801), 1st Vice President of the United States (1789-1797)
- Charles Devens, United States Attorney General (1877–1881)
- Charles Fried, United States Solicitor General (1985–1989)
- Horace Gray, Associate Justice of the Supreme Court of the United States (1882–1902)
- Ebenezer R. Hoar, United States Attorney General (1869–1870)
- Oliver Wendell Holmes Jr., Associate Justice of the Supreme Court of the United States (1902–1932)
- Roderick Ireland, first Black Justice and first Black Chief Justice
- Geraldine Hines, first African American woman Justice
- Fernande "Nan" Duffy, first Asian-American woman Justice
- Barabara Lenk, first LGBTQ+ Justice
- Dalia Argaez Wendlandt, first Hispanic Justice

=== Notable Chief Justices of the court ===
- Francis Dana (1791–1806)
- Theophilus Parsons (1806–1813), Federalist leader, Constitutional scholar
- Samuel Sewall (1814)
- Isaac Parker (1814–1830)
- Lemuel Shaw (1830–1860), father-in-law of Herman Melville

== Works cited ==
- Davis, William (1900). History of the Judiciary of Massachusetts
- Massachusetts Civil List for the Colonial and Provincial Periods
- Reno, Conrad. Memoirs of the Judiciary and the Bar of New England, Volume 1
