= List of justices of the Massachusetts Supreme Judicial Court =

Judaism #18

The following is a list of justices of the Massachusetts Supreme Judicial Court which are broken down by pre- and post-statehood appointments. Historically, only three individuals have declined appointment to the Court which all occurred during the Provincial Congress period: William Reed in 1775, Robert Treat Paine in 1776, and James Warren in 1777. Justices initially served a lifetime role until (in most cases) they either died or resigned. In the modern era, mandatory retirement has been a requirement when a given justice reaches the age of 70. This practice has been in place since 1976 when Chief Justice G. Joseph Tauro stepped down.

== Current justices ==
Title	Name	Began active service	Appointed by	Reaches age 70
Chief Justice	Kimberly S. Budd	2020 (2016 as Associate Justice)	Charlie Baker	2036
Associate Justice	Frank Gaziano	2016	Charlie Baker	2034
Associate Justice	Scott L. Kafker	2017	Charlie Baker	2029
Associate Justice	Dalila Argaez Wendlandt	2020	Charlie Baker	2039
Associate Justice	Serge Georges Jr.	2020	Charlie Baker	2038
Associate Justice	Bessie Dewar	2024	Maura Healey	2050
Associate Justice	Gabrielle Wolohojian	2024	Maura Healey	2030

== Superior Court of Judicature (1692–1780) ==
- Appointed by Provincial Congress (Note: These justices were appointed by a provisional government. The Province of Massachusetts Bay was dissolved in 1780 when the Constitution of Massachusetts was adopted.)

=== Chief justices ===
#	Image	Justice	Succeeded	Tenure	Appointed by
1		William Stoughton (1631–1701)	Inaugural (Note: All judges appointed before 1695 were reappointed in that year (except John Richards, who had died) because the legislation creating the court was vetoed in that year by the Privy Council. Several further attempts to legislate the court's existence were vetoed, and it was not until 1699 that the provincial assembly enacted laws creating courts that satisfied the Privy Council.)	1692 – July 7, 1701 (Died)	Sir William Phips
2		Wait Winthrop (1642–1717)	W. Stoughton	1701 – 1701 (Resigned)	Governor's Council
3		Isaac Addington (1645–1719)	W. Winthrop	1702 – 1703 (Resigned)	Joseph Dudley
4		Wait Winthrop (1642–1717)	I. Addington	1708 – November 7, 1717 (Died)	Joseph Dudley
5		Samuel Sewall (1652–1730)	W. Winthrop	1718 – 1728 (Resigned)	Samuel Shute
6		Benjamin Lynde Sr. (1666–1745)	Sa. Sewall	1729 – January 28, 1745 (Died)	William Burnet
7		Paul Dudley (1675–1751)	B. Lynde Sr.	1745 – January 25, 1751 (Died)	William Shirley
8		Stephen Sewall (1702–1760)	P. Dudley	1751 – September 10, 1760 (Died)	William Shirley
9		Thomas Hutchinson (1711–1780)	St. Sewall	1761 – 1769 (Became Acting Governor)	Francis Bernard
10		Benjamin Lynde Jr. (1700–1781)	T. Hutchinson	1769 – 1771 (Resigned)	Thomas Hutchinson
11		Peter Oliver (1713–1791)	B. Lynde Jr.	1772 – 1775 (Removed from office)	Thomas Hutchinson
12		John Adams (1735–1826)	Inaugural	1775 – 1777 (Never presided, resigned)	Provincial Congress
13		William Cushing (1732–1810)	J. Adams	1777 – 1780 (Constitution of 1780)	Provincial Congress

=== Associate justices ===
#	Image	Justice	Succeeded	Tenure	Appointed by
1		Thomas Danforth (1623–1699)	Inaugural	1692 – November 5, 1699 (Died)	Sir William Phips
2		Wait Winthrop (1642–1717)	Inaugural	1692 – 1701 (Continued as Chief Justice)	Sir William Phips
3	None (Note: There are no known portraits of this justice.)	John Richards (d. 1694)	Inaugural	1692 – April 2, 1694 (Died)	Sir William Phips
4		Samuel Sewall (1652–1730)	Inaugural	1692 – 1718 (Continued as Chief Justice)	Sir William Phips
5		Elisha Cooke Sr. (1637–1715)	J. Richards	1695 – 1702 (Resigned)	William Stoughton
6		John Walley (d. 1712)	T. Danforth	1700 – 1712 (Died)	William Stoughton
7		John Saffin (bapt. 1626–1710)	W. Winthrop	1701 – 1702 (Appointment not renewed)	Governor's Council
8		John Hathorne (1641–1717)	E. Cooke	1702 – 1712 (Resigned)	Joseph Dudley
9		John Leverett (1662–1724)	J. Saffin	1702 – 1708 (Resigned)	Joseph Dudley
10		Jonathan Corwin (1640–1718)	J. Leverett	1708 – 1717 (Appointment not renewed)	Joseph Dudley
11		Benjamin Lynde Sr. (1666–1745)	Vacant (Note: Lynde and Thomas were appointed to fill vacancies created by the death of John Whalley and the resignation of John Hathorne.)	1712 – 1729 (Continued as Chief Justice)	Joseph Dudley
12		Nathaniel Thomas (1643–1718)	Vacant	1712 – October 22, 1718 (Died)	Joseph Dudley
13		Addington Davenport (1670–1736)	J. Corwin	December 9, 1715 – April 3, 1736 (Died)	William Tailer
14		Edmund Quincy III (1681–1737)	Vacant (Note: Quincy and Dudley were appointed to fill vacancies created by the deaths of Wait Winthrop and Nathaniel Thomas.)	1718 – February 23, 1737 (Died)	Samuel Shute
15		Paul Dudley (1675–1751)	Vacant	1718 – 1751 (Continued as Chief Justice)	Samuel Shute
16		John Cushing (1662–1738)	B. Lynde Sr.	1728 – 1733 (Resigned)	William Burnet
17		Jonathan Remington (1677–1745)	J. Cushing	1733 – September 20, 1745 (Died)	Jonathan Belcher
18		Richard Saltonstall (1703–1756)	A. Davenport	1736 – 1756 (Resigned)	Jonathan Belcher
19		Thomas Graves (1684–1747)	E. Quincy	1737 – 1738 (Resigned)	Jonathan Belcher
20		Stephen Sewall (1702–1760)	T. Graves	1739 – 1745 (Continued as Chief Justice)	Jonathan Belcher
21		Nathaniel Hubbard (1680–1748)	P. Dudley	1745 – 1746	William Shirley
22		Benjamin Lynde Jr. (1700–1781)	J. Remington	1747 – 1769 (Continued as Chief Justice)	William Shirley
23		John Cushing Jr. (1695–1778)	N. Hubbard	1747 – 1771 (Resigned)	William Shirley
24		Chambers Russell (1713–1766)	St. Sewall	1752 – 1766 (Died)	Spencer Phips
25		Peter Oliver (1713–1791)	R. Saltonstall	1756 – 1772 (Continued as Chief Justice)	William Shirley
26		Edmund Trowbridge (1709–1793)	C. Russell	1767 – 1775 (Removed from office)	Francis Bernard
27		Foster Hutchinson (1724–1799)	B. Lynde Jr.	1771 – 1775 (Removed from office)	Thomas Hutchinson
28		Nathaniel Ropes (1726–1774)	Vacant (Note: Ropes and Cushing were appointed to replace John Cushing and Benjamin Lynde Jr., both of whom resigned. Peter Oliver was named Chief Justice, replacing Lynde.)	1772 – 1774 (Died)	Thomas Hutchinson
29		William Cushing (1732–1810)	Vacant	1772 – 1775 (Reorganization of Court)	Thomas Hutchinson
30		William Brown (1737–1802)	N. Ropes	1774 – 1775 (Removed from office)	Thomas Hutchinson
31		William Cushing (1732–1810)	Inaugural	1775 – 1776 (Continued as Chief Justice)	Provincial Congress
32	None	Nathaniel Sargent (1731–1791)	Inaugural	1775 – 1780 (Constitution of 1780)	Provincial Congress
33		Jedediah Foster (1726–1779)	Inaugural	1776 – October 17, 1779 (Died)	Provincial Congress
34		James Sullivan (1744–1808)	Inaugural	March 1776 – 1780 (Constitution of 1780)	Provincial Congress
35		David Sewall (1735–1825)	W. Cushing	1777 – 1780 (Constitution of 1780)	Provincial Congress

== Massachusetts Supreme Judicial Court (1780–present) ==
Image	Justice	Position	Succeeded	Tenure	Appointed by
	William Cushing (1732–1810)	Chief; Justice	Inaugural	1780 – 1789 (Appointed to Supreme Court)	Provincial Congress
None	Nathaniel Sargent (1731–1791)	Associate; Justice	Inaugural	1780 – 1791 (Continued as Chief Justice)	Provincial Congress
	David Sewall (1735–1825)	Associate; Justice	Inaugural (Note: This seat was abolished in 1804.)	1780 – 1789 (Appointed to U.S. District Court)	Provincial Congress
	James Sullivan (1744–1808)	Associate; Justice	Inaugural	1780 – 1782 (Resigned)	Provincial Congress
	Francis Dana (1743–1811)	Associate; Justice	J. Foster (1779)	1785 – 1806 (Continued as Chief Justice)	Provincial Congress
	Increase Sumner (1746–1799)	Associate; Justice	J. Sullivan	1782 – 1787 (Resigned to become Governor)	John Hancock
None	Nathaniel Sargent (1731–1791)	Chief; Justice	W. Cushing	1790 – October 2, 1791 (Died)	John Hancock
	Robert Treat Paine (1731–1814)	Associate; Justice	D. Sewall	1790 – 1804 (Resigned)	John Hancock
None	Nathan Cushing (1742–1812)	Associate; Justice	N. Sargent (as Associate Justice)	1790 – 1800 (Resigned)	John Hancock
	Francis Dana (1743–1811)	Chief; Justice	N. Sargent (as Chief Justice)	1791 – 1806 (Resigned)	John Hancock
	Thomas Dawes (1731–1809)	Associate; Justice	F. Dana (as Associate Justice)	1792 – 1802 (Resigned)	John Hancock
None	Theophilus Bradbury (1739–1803)	Associate; Justice	I. Sumner	1797 – July 1803 (Removed due to poor health)	John Hancock
	Samuel Sewall (1757–1814)	Associate; Justice	N. Cushing	1800 – 1814 (Continued as Chief Justice)	Caleb Strong
	Theodore Sedgwick (1746–1813)	Associate; Justice	T. Dawes	1802 – January 24, 1813 (Died)	Caleb Strong
None	Simeon Strong (1736–1805)	Associate; Justice	Inaugural	1801 – 1805 (Died)	Caleb Strong
	George Thatcher (1754–1824)	Associate; Justice	Inaugural	1801 – January 1824 (Resigned)	Caleb Strong
	Theophilus Parsons (1750–1813)	Chief; Justice	F. Dana	1806 – October 13, 1813 (Died)	Caleb Strong
	Isaac Parker (1768–1830)	Associate; Justice	S. Strong	1806 – 1814 (Continued as Chief Justice)	Caleb Strong
None	Charles Jackson (1775–1855)	Associate; Justice	T. Sedgwick	1813 – 1823 (Resigned)	Caleb Strong
	Samuel Sewall (1757–1814)	Chief; Justice	T. Parsons	1814 – June 8, 1814 (Died)	Caleb Strong
	Daniel Dewey (1766–1815)	Associate; Justice	S. Sewall (as Associate Justice)	1814 – May 26, 1815 (Died)	Caleb Strong
	Samuel Putnam (1768–1853)	Associate; Justice	I. Parker (as Associate Justice)	1814 – 1842 (Resigned)	Caleb Strong
	Isaac Parker (1768–1830)	Chief; Justice	S. Sewall	1814 – July 25, 1830 (Died)	Caleb Strong
—N/a	Samuel Wilde (1771–1855)	Associate; Justice	D. Dewey	1815 – 1850 (Resigned)	Caleb Strong
	Levi Lincoln Jr. (1782–1868)	Associate; Justice	G. Thatcher	1824 – 1825 (Elected Governor)	William Eustis
	Marcus Morton (1784–1864)	Associate; Justice	L. Lincoln Jr.	1825 – 1840 (Elected Governor)	Levi Lincoln Jr.
	Lemuel Shaw (1781–1861)	Chief; Justice	I. Parker	August 30, 1830 – August 21, 1860 (Resigned)	Levi Lincoln Jr.
—N/a	Charles Augustus Dewey (1793–1866)	Associate; Justice	C. Jackson (Note: There was a 14-year vacancy in between the two justices.)	1837 – 1866 (Died)	Edward Everett
—N/a	Samuel Hubbard (1785–1847)	Associate; Justice	S. Putnam	1842 – 1847 (Died)	John Davis
	Theron Metcalf (1784–1875)	Associate; Justice	M. Morton I (Note: There was an 8-year vacancy in between the two justices.)	1848 – 1865 (Resigned)	George N. Briggs
—N/a	Charles E. Forbes (1795–1881)	Associate; Justice	S. Hubbard	1848 – 1848 (Resigned)	George N. Briggs
	Richard Fletcher (1788–1869)	Associate; Justice	C. Forbes	1848 – 1853 (Resigned)	George N. Briggs
	George Tyler Bigelow (1810–1878)	Associate; Justice	S. Wilde	1850 – 1860 (Continued as Chief Justice)	George N. Briggs
	Caleb Cushing (1800–1879)	Associate; Justice	Inaugural	1852 – 1853 (Appointed U.S. Attorney General)	George S. Boutwell
	Benjamin Thomas (1813–1878)	Associate; Justice	R. Fletcher	1853 – 1859 (Resigned)	John H. Clifford
	Pliny Merrick (1794–1867)	Associate; Justice	C. Cushing	1853 – 1864 (Resigned)	John H. Clifford
	Ebenezer R. Hoar (1816–1895)	Associate; Justice	B. Thomas	1859 – 1869 (Appointed U.S. Attorney General)	Nathaniel Prentice Banks
	George Tyler Bigelow (1810–1878)	Chief; Justice	L. Shaw	1860 – 1867 (Resigned)	Nathaniel Prentice Banks
	Reuben Atwater Chapman (1801–1873)	Associate; Justice	G. T. Bigelow (as Associate Justice)	1860 – 1868 (Continued as Chief Justice)	Nathaniel Prentice Banks
	Horace Gray (1828–1902)	Associate; Justice	P. Merrick	1864 – September 15, 1873 (Continued as Chief Justice)	John Albion Andrew
	James Denison Colt (1819–1881)	Associate; Justice	T. Metcalf	1865 – 1866 (Resigned)	John Albion Andrew
	Dwight Foster (1828–1884)	Associate; Justice	J. Colt (first term)	1866 – 1869 (Resigned)	Alexander H. Bullock
	John Wells (1819–1875)	Associate; Justice	C. Dewey	1866 – 1875 (Died)	Alexander H. Bullock
	Reuben Atwater Chapman (1801–1873)	Chief; Justice	G. T. Bigelow	1868 – June 28, 1873 (Died)	Alexander H. Bullock
	James Denison Colt (1819–1881)	Associate; Justice	R. A. Chapman (as Associate Justice)	1868 – 1881 (Died)	Alexander H. Bullock
	Marcus Morton II (1819–1891)	Associate; Justice	E. Hoar	1869 – 1882 (Continued as Chief Justice)	William Claflin
	Seth Ames (1805–1881)	Associate; Justice	D. Foster	1869 – 1881 (Resigned)	William Claflin
	Horace Gray (1828–1902)	Chief; Justice	R. A. Chapman	September 15, 1873 – January 9, 1882 (Appointed to Supreme Court)	William B. Washburn
	Charles Devens (1820–1891)	Associate; Justice	H. Gray (as Associate Justice)	1873 – 1877 (Appointed U.S. Attorney General)	William B. Washburn
	William Endicott (1826–1900)	Associate; Justice	Inaugural	1873 – 1882 (Resigned)	William B. Washburn
	Otis Lord (1812–1884)	Associate; Justice	J. Wells	1875 – 1882 (Resigned)	William Gaston
	Augustus Soule (1827–1887)	Associate; Justice	C. Devens (first term)	March 27, 1877 – April 11, 1881 (Resigned)	Alexander H. Rice
	Walbridge A. Field (1833–1899)	Associate; Justice	S. Ames	1881 – September 4, 1890 (Continued as Chief Justice)	John D. Long
	William Allen (1822–1891)	Associate; Justice	J. Colt (second term)	1881 – 1891 (Died)	John D. Long
	Charles Devens (1820–1891)	Associate; Justice	A. Soule	1881 – 1891 (Died)	John D. Long
	Marcus Morton II (1819–1891)	Chief; Justice	H. Gray	1882 – 1890 (Resigned)	John D. Long
	Waldo Colburn (1824–1885)	Associate; Justice	W. Endicott	November 10, 1882 – September 26, 1885 (Died)	John D. Long
	Charles Allen (1827–1913)	Associate; Justice	M. Morton II	1882 – 1898 (Resigned)	John D. Long
	Oliver Wendell Holmes Jr. (1841–1935)	Associate; Justice	O. Lord	1882 – 1899 (Continued as Chief Justice)	John D. Long
	William Gardner (1827–1888)	Associate; Justice	W. Colburn	1885 – 1887 (Resigned)	George D. Robinson
	Marcus Perrin Knowlton (1839–1918)	Associate; Justice	W. Gardner	1887 – 1902 (Continued as Chief Justice)	Oliver Ames
	Walbridge A. Field (1833–1899)	Chief; Justice	M. Morton II	September 4, 1890 – July 15, 1899 (Died)	John Q. A. Brackett
	James Madison Morton Sr. (1837–1923)	Associate; Justice	W. A. Field (as Associate Justice)	1890 – 1913 (Resigned)	John Q. A. Brackett
	James Barker (1839–1905)	Associate; Justice	W. Allen	1891 – October 2, 1905 (Died)	William Russell
	John Lathrop (1835–1910)	Associate; Justice	C. Devens (second term)	1891 – 1906 (Resigned)	William Russell
	John Wilkes Hammond (1837–1922)	Associate; Justice	C. Allen	1898 – 1914 (Resigned)	Roger Wolcott
	Oliver Wendell Holmes Jr. (1841–1935)	Chief; Justice	W. A. Field	August 2, 1899 – December 4, 1902 (Appointed to Supreme Court)	Roger Wolcott
	William Loring (1851–1930)	Associate; Justice	O. W. Holmes (as Associate Justice)	September 7, 1899 – September 16, 1919 (Resigned)	Roger Wolcott
	Henry Braley (1850–1929)	Associate; Justice	M. P. Knowlton	1902 – 1929 (Died)	Winthrop M. Crane
	Marcus Perrin Knowlton (1839–1918)	Chief; Justice	O. W. Holmes	1902 – September 7, 1911 (Resigned)	Winthrop M. Crane
	Henry Newton Sheldon (1842–1926)	Associate; Justice	J. Barker	1905 – 1915 (Resigned)	William Lewis Douglas
	Arthur Prentice Rugg (1862–1938)	Associate; Justice	J. Lathrop	1906 – 1911 (Continued as Chief Justice)	Curtis Guild Jr.
	Arthur Prentice Rugg (1862–1938)	Chief; Justice	M. P. Knowlton	1911 – June 12, 1938 (Died)	Eugene Foss
	Charles DeCourcy (1857–1924)	Associate; Justice	A. P. Rugg (as Associate Justice)	1911 – 1924 (Died)	Eugene Foss
	John C. Crosby (1859–1943)	Associate; Justice	J. Morton	December 31, 1913 – October 1, 1937 (Resigned)	David I. Walsh
	Edward Pierce (1852–1938)	Associate; Justice	J. Hammond	1914 – 1937 (Resigned)	David I. Walsh
	James B. Carroll (1856–1932)	Associate; Justice	H. Sheldon	1915 – 1932 (Died)	David I. Walsh
	Charles Jenney (1860–1923)	Associate; Justice	W. Loring	1919 – November 29, 1923 (Died)	Calvin Coolidge
	William C. Wait (1860–1935)	Associate; Justice	C. Jenney	1923 – 1934 (Resigned)	Channing H. Cox
	George A. Sanderson (1863–1932)	Associate; Justice	C. DeCourcy	1924 – 1932 (Died)	Channing H. Cox
	Fred Tarbell Field (1876–1950)	Associate; Justice	H. Braley	January 30, 1929 – June 30, 1938 (Continued as Chief Justice)	Frank G. Allen
	Charles Donahue (1877–1952)	Associate; Justice	J. B. Carroll	March 17, 1932 – April 26, 1944 (Resigned)	Joseph B. Ely
	Henry T. Lummus (1876–1960)	Associate; Justice	G. A. Sanderson	1932 – 1955 (Resigned)	Joseph B. Ely
	Stanley Elroy Qua (1880–1965)	Associate; Justice	W. Wait	1934 – 1947 (Continued as Chief Justice)	Joseph B. Ely
	Arthur Dolan (1876–1949)	Associate; Justice	J. C. Crosby	1937 – August 20, 1949 (Resigned)	Charles F. Hurley
	Louis Cox (1874–1961)	Associate; Justice	E. Pierce	1937 – 1944 (Resigned)	Charles F. Hurley
	Fred Tarbell Field (1876–1950)	Chief; Justice	A. P. Rugg	June 30, 1938 – July 24, 1947 (Resigned)	Charles F. Hurley
	James Ronan (1884–1959)	Associate; Justice	F. T. Field (as Associate Justice)	1938 – 1959 (Died)	Charles F. Hurley
	Raymond Sanger Wilkins (1891–1971)	Associate; Justice	L. Cox	1944 – 1956 (Continued as Chief Justice)	Leverett Saltonstall
	John Spalding (1897–1979)	Associate; Justice	C. Donahue	1944 – 1971 (Resigned)	Leverett Saltonstall
	Stanley Elroy Qua (1880–1965)	Chief; Justice	F. T. Field	1947 – 1956 (Resigned)	Robert F. Bradford
	Harold P. Williams (1882–1963)	Associate; Justice	S. Qua (as Associate Justice)	1947 – 1962 (Resigned)	Robert F. Bradford
	Edward Counihan (1882–1961)	Associate; Justice	A. Dolan	1949 – 1960 (Resigned)	Paul A. Dever
	Arthur Whittemore (1896–1969)	Associate; Justice	H. Lummus	October 1955 – October 1, 1969 (Died)	Christian Herter
	Raymond Sanger Wilkins (1891–1971)	Chief; Justice	S. Qua	1956 – 1970 (Resigned)	Christian Herter
	R. Ammi Cutter (1902–1993)	Associate; Justice	R. S. Wilkins (as Associate Justice)	1956 – 1972 (Resigned)	Christian Herter
	Paul G. Kirk Sr. (1904–1981)	Associate; Justice	J. Ronan	November 23, 1960 – December 15, 1970 (Resigned)	Foster Furcolo
	Jacob Spiegel (1902–1984)	Associate; Justice	E. Counihan	1960 – 1972 (Resigned)	Foster Furcolo
—N/a	G. Joseph Tauro (1906–1994)	Associate; Justice		1961 – 1970 (Continued as Chief Justice)	John Volpe
	Paul Reardon (1909–1988)	Associate; Justice	H. P. Williams	1962 – 1977 (Resigned)	John Volpe
—N/a	G. Joseph Tauro (1906–1994)	Chief; Justice	R. S. Wilkins	1970 – 1976 (Mandatory retirement)	John Volpe
	Francis J. Quirico (1911–1999)	Associate; Justice	A. Whittemore	1969 – 1981 (Mandatory retirement)	Francis W. Sargent
	Robert Braucher (1916–1981)	Associate; Justice	P. Kirk	January 18, 1971 – August 26, 1981 (Died)	Francis W. Sargent
	Edward F. Hennessey (1919–2007)	Associate; Justice	J. Spalding	1971 – 1976 (Continued as Chief Justice)	Francis W. Sargent
	Benjamin Kaplan (1911–2010)	Associate; Justice	R. A. Cutter	1972 – 1981 (Mandatory retirement)	Francis W. Sargent
—N/a	Herbert P. Wilkins (1930–2025)	Associate; Justice	J. Spiegel	1972 – 1996 (Continued as Chief Justice)	Francis W. Sargent
	Edward F. Hennessey (1919–2007)	Chief; Justice	G. J. Tauro	1976 – 1989 (Mandatory retirement)	Michael Dukakis
	Paul J. Liacos (1929–1999)	Associate; Justice	E. Hennessey (as Associate Justice)	1976 – June 20, 1986 (Continued as Chief Justice)	Michael Dukakis
	Ruth Abrams (1930–2019)	Associate; Justice	P. Reardon	1978 – 2000 (Mandatory retirement)	Michael Dukakis
	Joseph R. Nolan (1925–2013)	Associate; Justice	F. Quirico	1981 – 1995 (Mandatory retirement)	Edward J. King
	Neil L. Lynch (1930–2014)	Associate; Justice	B. Kaplan	1981 – 2000 (Mandatory retirement)	Edward J. King
	Francis Patrick O'Connor (1927–2007)	Associate; Justice	R. Braucher	1981 – 1997 (Mandatory retirement)	Edward J. King
	Paul J. Liacos (1929–1999)	Chief; Justice	E. Hennessey	June 20, 1986 – September 30, 1996 (Retired)	Michael Dukakis
—N/a	John M. Greaney (1939–)	Associate; Justice	P. Liacos	1989 – 2008 (Retired)	Michael Dukakis
	Charles Fried (1935–2024)	Associate; Justice	J. Nolan	September 1995 – June 1999 (Retired)	William Weld
	Margaret H. Marshall (1944–)	Associate; Justice	H. Wilkins (as Associate Justice)	1996 – October 14, 1999 (Continued as Chief Justice)	William Weld
—N/a	Herbert P. Wilkins (1930–2025)	Chief; Justice	P. Liacos	1996 – October 13, 1999 (Retired)	William Weld
	Roderick L. Ireland (1944–)	Associate; Justice	F. O'Connor	1997 – December 20, 2010 (Continued as Chief Justice)	William Weld
	Margaret H. Marshall (1944–)	Chief; Justice	H. Wilkins	October 14, 1999 – October 31, 2010 (Retired)	Paul Cellucci
—N/a	Judith Cowin (1942–)	Associate; Justice	C. Fried	1999 – 2011 (Retired)	Paul Cellucci
—N/a	Francis X. Spina (1946–)	Associate; Justice	M. Marshall (as Associate Justice)	1999 – August 12, 2016 (Mandatory retirement)	Paul Cellucci
	Martha B. Sosman (1950–2007)	Associate; Justice	N. Lynch	2000 – March 10, 2007 (Died)	Paul Cellucci
—N/a	Robert J. Cordy (1949–)	Associate; Justice	R. Abrams	2001 – August 12, 2016 (Retired)	Paul Cellucci
	Margot Botsford (1947–)	Associate; Justice	M. Sosman	September 4, 2007 – March 15, 2017 (Mandatory retirement)	Deval Patrick
	Ralph Gants (1954–2020)	Associate; Justice	J. Greaney	January 29, 2009 – July 28, 2014 (Continued as Chief Justice)	Deval Patrick
	Roderick L. Ireland (1944–)	Chief; Justice	M. Marshall	December 20, 2010 – July 25, 2014 (Mandatory retirement)	Deval Patrick
	Barbara Lenk (1950–)	Associate; Justice	J. Cowin	June 8, 2011 – December 1, 2020 (Mandatory retirement)	Deval Patrick
—N/a	Fernande R.V. Duffly (1949–)	Associate; Justice	R. Ireland (as Associate Justice)	February 1, 2011 – July 12, 2016 (Retired)	Deval Patrick
	Ralph Gants (1954–2020)	Chief; Justice	R. Ireland	July 28, 2014 – September 14, 2020 (Died)	Deval Patrick
—N/a	Geraldine Hines (1947–)	Associate; Justice	R. Gants (as Associate Justice)	July 31, 2014 – August 18, 2017 (Mandatory retirement)	Deval Patrick
	Frank Gaziano (1963–)	Associate; Justice	F. Spina	August 18, 2016 – Incumbent	Charlie Baker
	Kimberly S. Budd (1966–)	Associate; Justice	F. Duffly	August 24, 2016 – December 1, 2020 (Continued as Chief Justice)	Charlie Baker
	David A. Lowy (1959/60–)	Associate; Justice	R. Cordy	August 24, 2016 – February 3, 2024 (Retired)	Charlie Baker
	Elspeth B. Cypher (1959–)	Associate; Justice	M. Botsford	March 31, 2017 – January 12, 2024 (Retired)	Charlie Baker
	Scott Kafker (1959–)	Associate; Justice	G. Hines	August 21, 2017 – Incumbent	Charlie Baker
	Kimberly S. Budd (1966–)	Chief; Justice	R. Gants	December 1, 2020 – Incumbent	Charlie Baker
	Dalila Argaez Wendlandt (1969–)	Associate; Justice	K. Budd (as Associate Justice)	December 4, 2020 – Incumbent	Charlie Baker
	Serge Georges Jr. (1970–)	Associate; Justice	B. Lenk	December 16, 2020 – Incumbent	Charlie Baker
	Bessie Dewar (1980–)	Associate; Justice	E. Cypher	January 16, 2024 – Incumbent	Maura Healey
	Gabrielle Wolohojian (1960–)	Associate; Justice	D. Lowy	April 22, 2024 – Incumbent	Maura Healey
