= Justice Hubbard =

Justice Hubbard may refer to:

- Samuel Hubbard (Massachusetts judge) (1785–1847), associate justice of the Massachusetts Supreme Judicial Court
- Jonathan H. Hubbard (1768–1849), associate justice of the Vermont Supreme Court
- Leverett Hubbard (1723–1793), associate justice of the New Hampshire Supreme Court
- Nathaniel Hubbard (1680–1748), associate justice of the Massachusetts Supreme Judicial Court
