= Charles Augustus Dewey =

American judge (1793–1866)

Charles Augustus Dewey (March 13, 1793 – August 22, 1866) was a justice of the Massachusetts Supreme Judicial Court from 1837 to 1866. He was appointed by Governor Edward Everett.

He was elected to the Massachusetts House of Representatives in 1823 and in 1825, and then in 1830 was elected to the Massachusetts Senate.

Dewey was born in Williamstown, MA on March 13, 1793, son of Daniel Dewey. He attended Williams College, graduating in 1811. After, he studied law with Theodore Sedgwick in Williamstown until 1826, when he moved to Northampton, MA. He was District Attorney from 1830 to 1837, then a justice of the Massachusetts Supreme Judicial Court until his death in Northampton on August 22, 1866. He died from dysentery.

Political offices
Preceded by Charles Jackson	Justice of the Massachusetts Supreme Judicial Court; 1837–1866	Succeeded by Dwight Foster
