= John Cushing =

John Cushing may refer to:

- John Cushing (actor) (1719–1790), British stage actor
- John Perkins Cushing (1787–1862), American sea merchant, opium smuggler, and philanthropist
- John Cushing (judge), Justice of the Massachusetts Supreme Court
- John Cushing Jr., Justice of the Massachusetts Supreme Court
