= Ash v. Childs Dining Hall Co. =

- Court: Massachusetts Supreme Judicial Court
- Full case name: Flora Ash v. Childs Dining Hall Company
- Decided: January 8, 1918
- Citations: Mass. 86; 120 N.E. 396

Court membership
- Judges sitting: Arthur Prentice Rugg, Charles DeCourcy, John Crawford Crosby, Edward Pierce, James Carroll

Ash v. Childs Dining Hall Co. is a tort case decided in 1918 by the New York Court of Appeals, notable for shaping the "reasonable expectation" test used in similar legal claims about foreign objects in food.

The case involved Flora Ash, who was injured by a small metal tack (nail) hidden in a blueberry pie served at the defendant's restaurant. The court declined to apply the doctrine of res ipsa loquitur (the thing speaks for itself) due to insufficient direct evidence of negligence by Childs Dining Hall Company. Without such proof, the defendant was not found liable. Despite the tack being something a consumer wouldn’t reasonably expect in pie, the defendant was not held liable without proof of fault. This ruling emphasized that liability requires both an unexpected harmful object and evidence of negligence, influencing how similar tort cases were evaluated in the future.

== See also ==
- Friend v. Childs Dining Hall Co.
