= Lynde (surname) =

Lynde is a surname. Notable people with the surname include:

- Benjamin Lynde Sr. (1666–1749), lawyer and magistrate of the Province of Massachusetts Bay
- Benjamin Lynde Jr. (1700–1781), American judge from Massachusetts
- Charles W. Lynde (1790–1860), American politician from New York
- Dolphus S. Lynde (1833–1902), American politician from New York
- Henry Lynde (died 1427 or 1428), English politician
- Sir Humphrey Lynde (1579–1636), English politician
- Paul Lynde (1926–1982), American actor and comedian
  - The Paul Lynde Show, sitcom 1972–1973
- Stan Lynde (1931–2013), American comic strip artist, painter and novelist
- William Pitt Lynde (1817–1885), American politician from Milwaukee
