= Rugg =

Rugg is a surname. Notable people with the surname include:

- Arthur Prentice Rugg (1862–1938), American judge
- Charles B. Rugg (1890–1962), American attorney
- Charlie Rugg (born 1990), American soccer player
- Gordon Rugg (born 1955), Scottish academic
- Harold Rugg (1886–1960), American educational reformer
- Henry Rugg (1625–1671), Irish Anglican priest
- Jim Rugg (born 1977), American cartoonist and illustrator
- John Rugg, associate of Benedictine monk Hugh Faringdon (died 1539)
- John Rugg (died 2008), Scottish football coach in the 1970s for Zimbabwean team Rio Tinto FC
- Keith Rugg, Australian rugby league footballer
- Michael D. Rugg (born 1954), American neuroscientist
- Paul Rugg (born 1960), American screen writer
- Paul Rugg (cricketer) (born 1978), New Zealand cricketer
- Percy Rugg (1906–1986), British politician
- Sally Rugg (born 1988), Australian activist
- Susie Rugg (born 1982), Australian actress
- Sylvanus T. Rugg (1834–1881), American Union Army officer
- William Rugg (died 1550), English theologian and bishop

== See also ==
- Peter Rugg, fictional character
- Rugg/Feldman benchmarks
- Bailey–Rugg Building, Illinois
- Rugg Elementary School, Louisiana
- Rugg Peak, Antarctica
