= Commonwealth v. Welansky =

Massachusetts Supreme Judicial Court case

- Court: Massachusetts Supreme Judicial Court
- Full case name: Commonwealth v. Barnett Welansky
- Decided: June 5, 1944
- Citations: 316 Mass. 383; 55 N.E.2d 902

Court membership
- Judges sitting: Fred Tarbell Field, Henry T. Lummus, Stanley Elroy Qua, Arthur Dolan, James Ronan, John Spaulding

Case opinions
- Decision by: Lummus

Keywords
- omission

Commonwealth v. Welansky, 316 Mass. 383, 55 N.E.2d 902 (1944), is a criminal case about the Cocoanut Grove fire that illustrates principles of negligent homicide and reckless homicide in the case where there is not an affirmative act, but a failure to act (omission) when there is a duty of care.

Barnett Welansky was found guilty of wanton or reckless homicide in the Cocoanut Grove fire. Welansky maintained and operated the Cocoanut Grove nightclub, knew or should have known that the club fire escapes were inadequate and in violation of building safety codes, and while Welansky was offsite, the building caught fire and hundreds could not escape and died.

The court wrote:

To convict the defendant of manslaughter... It was enough to prove that death resulted from his wanton or reckless disregard of the safety of his patrons in the event of fire from any cause... Usually wanton or reckless conduct consists of an affirmative act... in disregard of probable harmful consequences to another. But whereas there is a duty of care for the safety of business visitors invited to premises which the defendant controls, wanton or reckless conduct may consist of intentional failure to take such care in disregard of the probable harmful consequences to them or of their right of care.
