= Justice Cushing (disambiguation) =

Justice Cushing may refer to:

- William Cushing (1732–1810), associate justice of the United States Supreme Court
- Caleb Cushing (1800–1879), associate justice of the Massachusetts Supreme Judicial Court
- Edmund L. Cushing (1807–1883), associate justice of the New Hampshire Supreme Court
- John Cushing (judge) (1662–1738), associate justice of the Massachusetts Supreme Judicial Court
- John Cushing Jr. (1695–1778), associate justice of the Massachusetts Supreme Judicial Court
- Nathan Cushing (1742–1812), associate justice of the Massachusetts Supreme Judicial Court
- Stephen S. Cushing (1884–1957), associate justice of the Vermont Supreme Court
