= Senator Colburn =

Senator Colburn may refer to:

- Richard F. Colburn (born 1950), Maryland State Senate
- Waldo Colburn (1824–1885), Massachusetts State Senate
