= George Tyler Bigelow =

American judge (1810–1878)

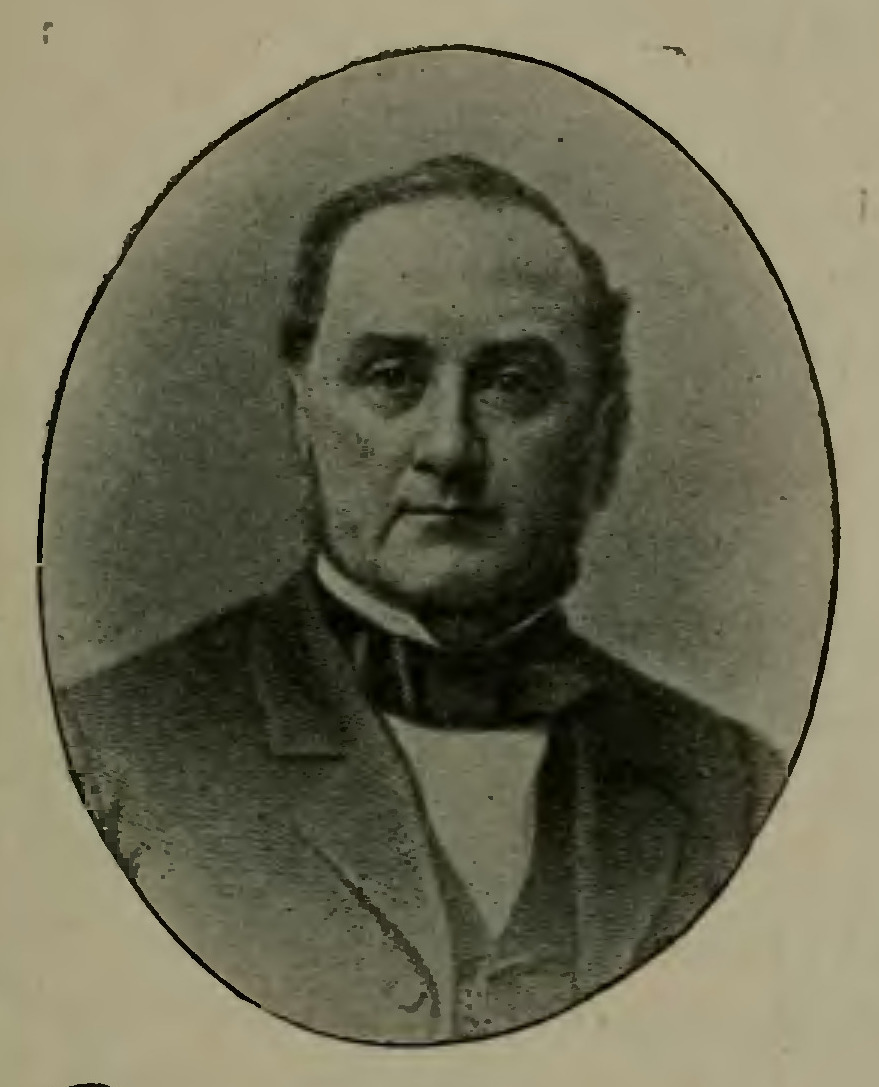
George Tyler Bigelow

George Tyler Bigelow (October 6, 1810 – April 12, 1878) was a justice of the Massachusetts Supreme Judicial Court from 1850 to 1867, serving as chief justice from 1860 to 1867. He was appointed to the court by Governor George N. Briggs, and elevated to Chief Justice by Governor Nathaniel P. Banks.

== Early life, education, and career ==
Born at Watertown, Massachusetts, the son of Tyler Bigelow, an eminent lawyer in Middlesex County, and grandson of Revolutionary War soldier Timothy Bigelow, Bigelow entered the Boston Latin School in 1820, in a period when the school had a large number of students who went on to become notable. Bigelow entered Harvard College in 1825, at the age of 15, and graduated in 1829. Having graduated at age 19, Bigelow "was deemed too young to begin a career in law and so was sent to Maryland to gain a broader knowledge of the world through teaching". He was principal of the Brookville Academy in Maryland for a year, and then tutor to the children of Henry Bloomsbury of Maryland for another year. Then he returned home and began to read law in his father's office.

In 1833 Bigelow went to study in the law office of Charles G. Loring, Boston, and the next year was admitted to the bar at East Cambridge. In 1835 he opened an office at Boston and "began at once to make a reputation".

== Military and political activities ==
He was elected ensign of the New England Guards, a popular Boston militia. Following the Broad Street Riot on June 11, 1837, the guards were felt to have provided excellent service in dealing with the event, and Bigelow was chosen as their captain. The next year, in 1840, he was elected to the Massachusetts House of Representatives, and was reelected for the next four years. In his second year he was chairman of the Committee on Manufactures.

In 1841 he was made colonel of the Boston regiment of infantry, and served for three years. In 1843 he formed a legal partnership with Manlius S. Clarke, and began to practice, principally as a jury advocate. In 1844 was appointed by Governor George N. Briggs as his aid. He also served for three years in the Massachusetts State Senate.

== Judicial service and later life ==
In 1848, Bigelow was appointed by Governor Briggs to a seat on the old court of Common Pleas. The appointment "was much criticized, but the criticism did not continue long". One who knew him well has said, "From the first day he took his seat, he was every inch a judge. In the despatch of business, in the management of the docket, in his clear and able charges to the jury, in his absolute impartiality, he won the applause and even the admiration of the bar". The Whigs nominated Bigelow for Congress in 1850, but he withdrew his name.

Briggs then appointed Bigelow to a seat on the state supreme court vacated by the resignation of Judge Samuel Wilde. For 16 years Bigelow served as associate justice, and in October 1860, Governor Nathaniel P. Banks appointed Bigelow chief justice to succeed Judge Lemuel Shaw.

In the latter part of 1867 he felt it necessary, on account of feeling health, to retire from the bench. He announced his intention to retire on December 30, 1867. The announcement was met with general regret, and he was requested by members of the bar to reconsider his determination of resigning. On December 31, 1867, however, Bigelow resigned, although more than 300 lawyers signed petitions urging him to remain in office. He became the actuary of the Massachusetts Hospital Life Insurance Company, retiring in January 1877.

In 1868 Bigelow was elected one of the overseers of Harvard university, and was a member of the Corporation of Harvard College from the year 1868 to the time of his death. In 1873 he was a member of the commission for the revision of the Boston City charter. During his career, Bigelow published 88 volumes of reports.

== Personal life and death ==
Early in life, he married Hannah Millar of Quincy, Massachusetts.

Bigelow died in Boston at the age of 67.

Political offices
Preceded by Samuel Wilde	Justice of the Massachusetts Supreme Judicial Court; 1850–1867	Succeeded by Reuben Atwater Chapman
