= Friend v. Childs Dining Hall Co. =

- Court: Massachusetts Supreme Judicial Court
- Full case name: Friend v. Childs Dining Hall Company
- Decided: September 11, 1918
- Citations: 231 Mass. 65; 120 N.E. 407

Court membership
- Judges sitting: Arthur Prentice Rugg, Henry Braley, John Crawford Crosby, Edward Pierce, James Carroll

Case opinions
- Decision by: Rugg
- Dissent: Crosby

Keywords
- Product liability

Friend v. Childs Dining Hall Co., 231 Mass. 65, 120 N.E. 407 (1918), is part of a progression of cases that influenced the products liability synthesis that emerged in the 1930s. These cases influenced Judge Cardozo's argument in MacPherson v. Buick Motor Co. that a person could be liable for a defective product to someone other than the immediate purchaser. This created the law of product liability.

== Facts ==
Plaintiff entered defendant's restaurant and ordered "New York baked beans and corned beef." There were stones in the food. There was no evidence either that the defendant knew of the presence of the stones in the food, or that he made an express warranty as to the food. The plaintiff gave no instructions respecting the food other than to order it.

Plaintiff started with a declaration which sought recovery in both tort and contract. Then she abandoned the tort claim. At trial, the defendant won a directed verdict because the judge decided that there was no cause of action in contract. Plaintiff appeals her contract claim, arguing that the defendant breached an implied warranty under the Uniform Sales Act (St. 1908 c. 237 §15(1), predecessor of UCC Article 2), which says that:

“Where the buyer, expressly or by implication, makes known to the seller the particular purpose for which the goods are required, and it appears that the buyer relies on the seller’s skill or judgment, whether he be the grower or manufacturer or not, there is an implied warranty that the goods shall be reasonably fit for such purpose.”

== Holding ==
Under the Sales Act, it does not matter whether it was established on the evidence that the transaction between the plaintiff and the defendant was a sale of food, or a contract for entertainment, in order to be submitted to a jury.

- 1 The service of food by the defendant is a “sale” under the sales act, St. 1908, c. 237, §15(1). Under tort law, when the keeper of a public eating place supplies food to a person who has supplied consideration to be served with food for immediate consumption, the keeper has an implied duty to furnish food to eat. However, there is additionally a contract relationship between these parties. When a restaurant supplies a meal to a customer (customer making known, as the purpose for which food is required, that it is to be eaten), then a sale of food occurs (by the terms of the Sales Act, § 15, subd.1). Accordingly, there is an implied warranty it is reasonably fit for consumption, and the restaurant can be liable for breach of this contract, and not merely for negligence.
- 2 Food for immediate use, which is not fit to eat, is not merchantable as food. In an action for breach of an implied warranty of fitness of food served by a restaurant, whether plaintiff was or was not in the exercise of “due care” was immaterial; the term being one of the law of torts. Instead—whether the transaction established on the evidence between the plaintiff and the defendant be treated as a sale of food or as a contract for entertainment—there are relevant facts to be submitted to the jury, including: whether rational investigation of the character of the food was made by plaintiff, and whether its noxious nature should have been discovered.

== See also ==
- Ash v. Childs Dining Hall Co.
