= Judge Field =

Judge Field may refer to:

- John A. Field Jr. (1910–1995), judge of the United States Court of Appeals for the Fourth Circuit
- Richard Stockton Field (1803–1870), judge of the United States District Court for the District of New Jersey

== See also ==
- Justice Field (disambiguation)
