= Cushing =

Cushing may refer to:

== People ==
- Cushing (surname)

== Places in the United States ==
- Cushing, Iowa
- Cushing, Maine
- Cushing, Minnesota
- Cushing Township, Minnesota
- Cushing, Nebraska
- Cushing, Oklahoma
- Cushing, Texas
- Cushing, Wisconsin
- Cushing Island, Maine

== Other uses ==
- Cushing Academy, a boarding school in Ashburnham, Massachusetts
- Cushing Hall, a dormitory at Hampden–Sydney College in Hampden Sydney, Virginia
- Cushing House, a dormitory at Vassar College in Poughkeepsie, New York
- Cushing House Museum and Garden in Newburyport, Massachusetts
- Cushing's disease, an endocrine disorder (one of several specific causes of Cushing's syndrome)
- Cushing's syndrome, an endocrine disorder (an umbrella term for several disorders, including Cushing's disease and related disorders)
- Cushing reflex, in response to brain ischemia
  - Cushing's triad, a clinical triad
- Cushing ulcer, a gastric ulcer
- USS Cushing (DD-985)

== See also ==
- Justice Cushing (disambiguation)
