= Justice Carroll =

Justice Carroll may refer to:

- James Bernard Carroll (1856–1932), associate justice of the Massachusetts Supreme Judicial Court
- Karen Carroll (judge) (born 1963), associate justice of the Vermont Supreme Court
- Mella Carroll (1934–2006), judge of the High Court of Ireland
