= James L. Peters =

American ornithologist

James Lee Peters (August 13, 1889 – April 19, 1952) was an American ornithologist.

He was born in Boston, Massachusetts to Dr. Austin Peters and Francis Howie Lee on August 13, 1889. His early education was at the Roxbury Latin School, followed by his acceptance to Harvard University, where he graduated in 1912.

Peters interest in natural history developed early. His early collecting trips included traveling with Arthur Cleveland Bent, Charles Haskins Townsend and H.K. Job to the Magdalen Islands. Three of Peters early mentors were Charles Johnson Maynard, judge Charles Jenney and Outram Bangs.

Ultimately, Peters was Curator of Birds at the Museum of Comparative Zoology, at Harvard University. He served as president of the American Ornithologists' Union in 1942–45, and also served as president of International Commission on Zoological Nomenclature for a period.

Peters is best known for his multi-volume Check-list of Birds of the World (1931–52), widely referred to simply as the Peters' check-list. Compared to earlier check-lists written by Richard Bowdler Sharpe, the list by Peters made several significant advances, among others using subspecies (trinomial nomenclature), which Bowdler's had not. For the first four volumes Peters was awarded the Brewster Medal. Peters died before finishing the work, and the last volumes, as well as updates to some of the first, were completed by Ernst Mayr, James Greenway, Melvin Alvah Traylor, Jr. and others, with the final being volume 16 published in 1987. This check-list has been highly influential in ornithology, and has – either directly or indirectly – been used as a basis for numerous modern check-lists such as The Clements Checklist of the Birds of the World by James Clements, The Howard and Moore Complete Checklist of the Birds of the World edited by Edward C. Dickinson, Distribution and Taxonomy of Birds of the World by Charles Sibley and Burt Monroe, the AOU Checklist of North American Birds by AOU, and the check-list to birds of South America by SACC.
