= Charles Devens =

American judge (1820–1891)

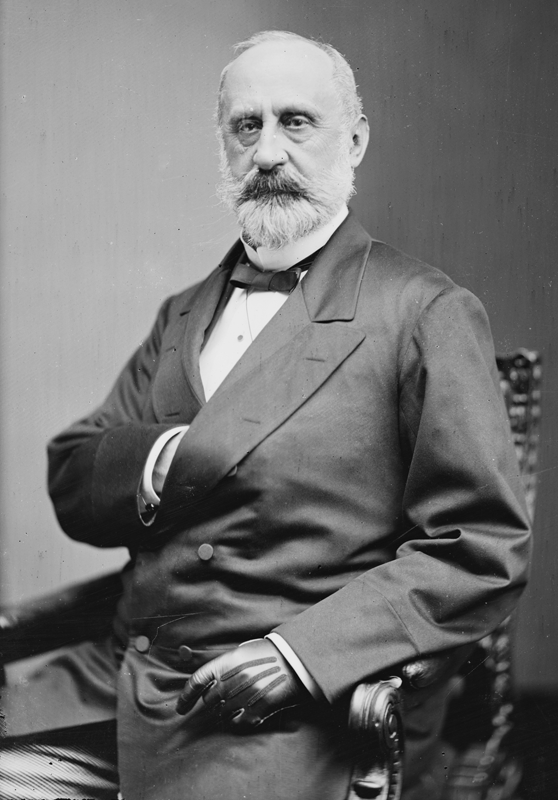
- Devens, 1865–1880

Associate Justice of the Massachusetts Supreme Judicial Court
- In office 1873–1877
- Preceded by: Horace Gray
- Succeeded by: August Soule
- In office 1881–1891
- Preceded by: August Soule
- Succeeded by: John Lathrop

Judge of the Massachusetts Superior Court
- In office 1867–1873

35th United States Attorney General
- In office March 12, 1877 – March 4, 1881
- President: Rutherford B. Hayes
- Preceded by: Alphonso Taft
- Succeeded by: Wayne MacVeagh

Member of the Massachusetts Senate
- In office 1848–1849

Personal details
- Born: April 4, 1820 Charlestown, Massachusetts, U.S.
- Died: January 7, 1891 (aged 70) Boston, Massachusetts, U.S.
- Party: Whig (Before 1860); Democratic (1860–1867); Republican (1867–1891)
- Education: Harvard University (BA, LLB)

Military service
- Allegiance: United States • Union
- Branch/service: United States Army • Union Army
- Years of service: 1861–1866
- Rank: Brigadier General; Brevet Major General
- Battles/wars: American Civil War

Charles Devens Jr. (April 4, 1820 – January 7, 1891) was an American lawyer, jurist and statesman. He also served as a general in the Union Army during the American Civil War.

== Early life and career ==
Born in Charlestown, Massachusetts, Devens graduated from Boston Latin School and eventually Harvard College in 1838, and from the Harvard Law School in 1840. He was admitted to the bar in Franklin County, Massachusetts, where he practiced law from 1841 to 1849.

In 1848, he was a Whig member of the Massachusetts Senate. From 1849 to 1853, Devens was United States Marshal for Massachusetts, in which capacity he was called upon in 1851 to remand the fugitive slave, Thomas Sims, to slavery. This he felt constrained to do, much against his personal desire; subsequently, he attempted in vain to purchase Sims's freedom, and many years later appointed him to a position in the United States Department of Justice in Washington, D.C.

Devens practiced law at Worcester, Massachusetts, from 1853 until 1861.

== Civil War ==
On April 16, 1861, Devens gave an impassioned speech at Mechanics Hall in Worcester in support of Lincoln's call for 75,000 volunteers. To a large crowd he called upon the young men of Worcester to "rise and go with" him to the "rescue of Washington". Three days later, he was appointed major of the 3rd Massachusetts Rifle Battalion.

He was appointed as colonel of the 15th Massachusetts Infantry in July 1861 and wounded at the Battle of Ball's Bluff in Virginia in October.

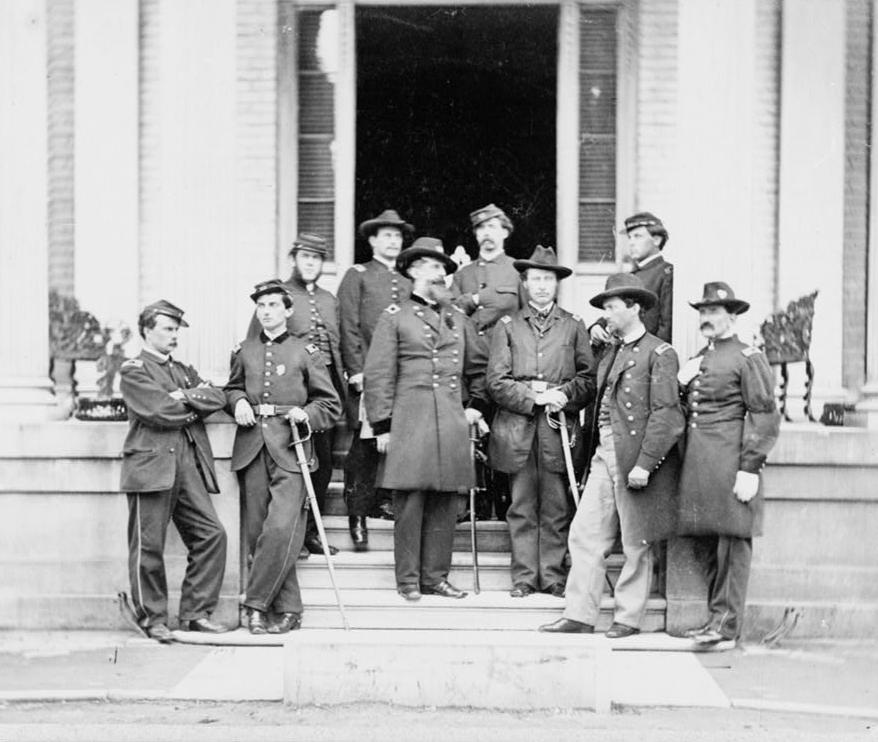
General Charles Devens (center) and other officers in Richmond, Virginia, April, 1865.

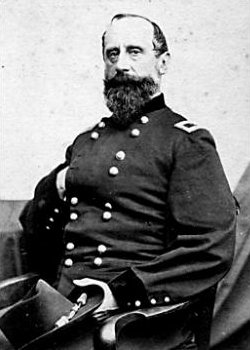
General Charles Devens

Although still recovering, Devens was promoted to brigadier general of volunteers in April 1862 and assigned command of the 1st Brigade/1st Division. He was wounded a second time at the Battle of Seven Pines and spent most of the summer recovering. His brigade was not heavily involved in the Maryland Campaign. Shortly afterwards, it was reassigned to the VI Corps. Devens commanded the 2nd Brigade/3rd Division/VI Corps during the Battle of Fredericksburg.

In January 1863, Devens was given command of the 1st Brigade, 3rd Division, VI Corps. After Maj. Gen Oliver O. Howard took command of the XI Corps, he appointed Devens as a division commander, and at Chancellorsville he was wounded a third time. According to a report by Gen. Steward L. Woodford, who served with him, Devens remounted his horse, stayed with his men and did not go to the hospital until his men had bivouacked (set up camp).

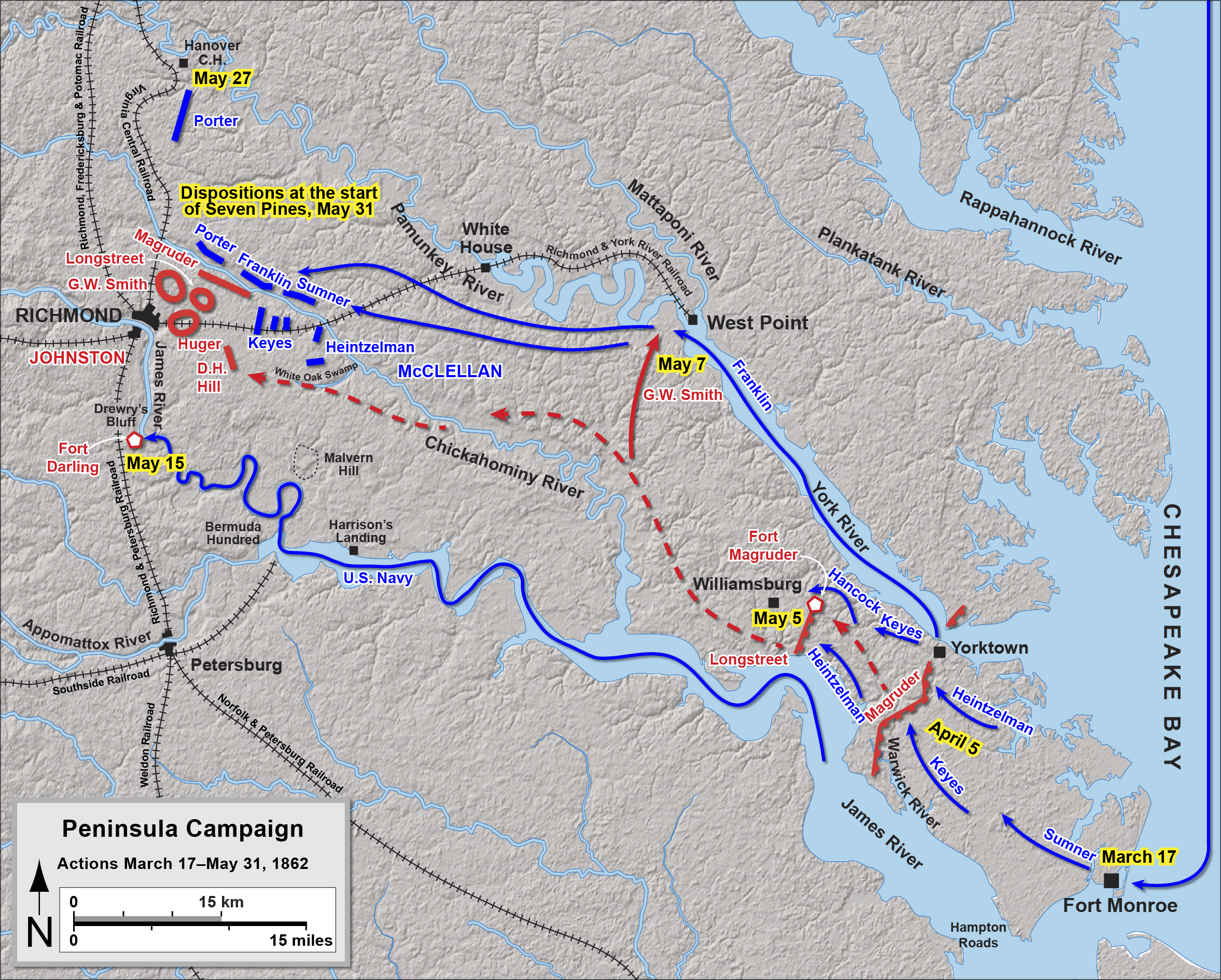
Peninsula Campaign March 17 – May 31, 1862

Devens distinguished himself at the Battle of Cold Harbor, while commanding the 3rd Division/XVIII Corps in Ulysses S. Grant's Overland Campaign. During the final stages of the Siege of Petersburg, he commanded the 3rd Division of the XXIV Corps.

Devens's troops were the first to occupy Richmond after its fall in April 1865.

After the war, Devens became a companion of the Massachusetts Commandery of the Military Order of the Loyal Legion of the United States.

== Postbellum ==
On January 13, 1866, President Andrew Johnson nominated Devens for the award of the honorary grade of brevet major general, United States Volunteers, to rank from April 3, 1865, for services during the Richmond campaign, and the U.S. Senate confirmed the award on March 12, 1866. Devens remained in the army for a year as commander of the military district of Charleston, South Carolina, before mustering out and returning home. He later served as the fifth Commander-in-Chief of the Grand Army of the Republic from 1873 to 1875 and was also a veteran companion of the Military Order of the Loyal Legion of the United States.

Devens was also a key figure in the investigation into the execution of Confederate veteran Calvin Crozier by soldiers of the 33rd Regiment, U.S. Colored Troops, at Newberry, South Carolina in September 1865 following an altercation in which a soldier was seriously wounded and expected to die. Over Devens's strong objections the officer in command, who claimed responsibility for the execution, after two separate trials, including a General Court Martial, in which both courts found his actions justifiable, was exonerated and returned to duty.

He was a judge of the Massachusetts superior court, from 1867 to 1873, and was an associate justice of the Massachusetts Supreme Judicial Court from 1873 to 1877, and again from 1881 to 1891. From 1877 to 1881, he was Attorney General of the United States in the Cabinet of President Rutherford B. Hayes. Devens was a close friend to President Hayes and his family, and was a favorite of Washington society during his time in office.

He was elected a member of the American Antiquarian Society in 1878.

Charles Devens died of heart failure in Boston, Massachusetts in 1891, and is buried in Mount Auburn Cemetery in Cambridge, Massachusetts.

== Memorials ==
In 1906, the city of Worcester, Massachusetts, erected an equestrian statue of Charles Devens in front of the former Worcester Court House, located on Court Hill. The statue was originally located on the front middle of the Courthouse area, it was later relocated to the front side.

Camp Devens, later Fort Devens, was established in 1917 in the Massachusetts towns of Ayer, Harvard, Lancaster and Shirley, and named after the general.

== See also ==
- List of American Civil War generals (Union)
- List of Massachusetts generals in the American Civil War
- Massachusetts in the American Civil War

== Notes ==
Party political offices
Preceded by Isaac Davis	Democratic nominee for Governor of Massachusetts; 1862	Succeeded by Henry Paine
Non-profit organization positions
Preceded by Ambrose Burnside	Commander-in-Chief of the Grand Army of the Republic; 1873–1875	Succeeded by John F. Hartranft
Legal offices
Preceded by Horace Gray	Associate Justice of the Massachusetts Supreme Judicial Court; 1873–1877	Succeeded by Augustus Soule
Preceded by Augustus Soule	Associate Justice of the Massachusetts Supreme Judicial Court; 1881–1891	Succeeded by John Lathrop
Preceded by Alphonso Taft	United States Attorney General; 1877–1881	Succeeded by Wayne MacVeagh
