= William C. Wait =

American judge (1860–1935)

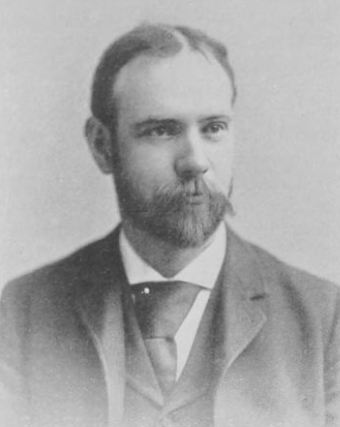
Massachusetts Supreme Judicial Court Judge William C. Wait

William Cushing Wait (December 18, 1860 – January 28, 1935) was a justice of the Massachusetts Supreme Judicial Court from 1923 to 1934. He was appointed by Governor Channing H. Cox.

Born in Charlestown, Massachusetts, to Elijah and Eliza Wait, his family moved to Medford, Massachusetts, in 1870, and Wait graduated from Medford High School in 1870. He received his undergraduate degree from Harvard College in 1882, followed by a law degree from Harvard Law School in 1885. He worked in the office of former Boston mayor Nathan Matthews Jr. for a year before entering into a partnership with a Harvard classmate.

In 1902, Governor Winthrop M. Crane appointed Wait to a seat on the Massachusetts Superior Court, and on December 26, 1923, Governor Channing H. Cox elevated Wait to a seat on the Massachusetts Supreme Judicial Court vacated by the death of Charles Jenney.

In December 1934, Wait petitioned Governor Ely to be retired due to his poor health.

== Personal life and death ==
On January 1, 1888, Wait married Edith Foote Wright, with whom he had one son. He died at his home in Medford, Massachusetts, at the age of 74, following a period of ill health.

Political offices
Preceded by Charles Jenney	Justice of the Massachusetts Supreme Judicial Court; 1923–1934	Succeeded by George A. Sanderson
