= Ruggs =

Ruggs may refer to:

- Henry Ruggs, American football player (born 1999)
- Ruggs, Oregon

== See also ==
- Rugg (surname)
