= Nathaniel Colburn =

Early English settler in Massachusetts (1611–1691)

- Born: 1611; Woolverstone, Suffolk, England
- Died: May 14, 1691 (aged 79–80); Dedham, Massachusetts Bay Colony, English America
- Spouse: Priscilla Clarke (m. 1639)
- Children: 11
- Relatives: Waldo Colburn (descendent)

Nathaniel Colburn (1611–1691) was an early settler and selectman in Dedham, Massachusetts.

== Early life ==
He was baptized in 1611 in Woolverstone, Suffolk, England. His parents were Leonard Colborne and Sara (née Lewes) and he had a sister named Sarah. In 1630, Governor John Winthrop organized a group of men to move to New England and Colburn joined the group.

== Dedham ==
Colburn arrived in Dedham shortly after it was incorporated in 1636. Colburn married Priscilla Clarke on July 25, 1639, and together they had 11 children. He signed the Dedham Covenant and was an original proprietor. In addition to being selectman for five years, he held a number of roles and positions of responsibility within the new town including tithingman. He had 11 children, the youngest of whom was Joseph.

Colburn was admitted to the First Church and Parish in Dedham on January 29, 1641, "after long and much inquisition into his case," nearly a year after his wife was. They lived nearby, on the west side of what is today Wigwam Creek. Part of Mother Brook ran through his land. He owned considerable property.

Ten years after King Phillip's War, question arose as to whether or not the town of Wrentham, Massachusetts was on land legally purchased from the Wampanoag people. In March 1667, Colburn testified that he personally witnessed Metacomet sign the deed to the lands.

== Death and legacy ==
Colburn died May 14, 1691. He was an ancestor of Waldo Colburn.

== Works cited ==
- Worthington, Erastus (1827). The history of Dedham: from the beginning of its settlement, in September 1635, to May 1827. Dutton and Wentworth. p. 29.
- Mann, Herman (1847). Historical Annals of Dedham: From Its Settlement in 1635 to 1847. Herman Mann.
- Todd, Georgia Brake (1939). God's Infinite Variety, an American. National Americana Publications, Incorporated.
