= Roger Sherman Baldwin Foster =

American lawyer

- Born: April 21, 1857; Worcester, Massachusetts, United States
- Died: February 22, 1924 (aged 66); New York City
- Education: Boston Latin School; University of Marburg; Yale University; Columbia Law School
- Occupation: Lawyer
- Spouse: Laura Pugh Moxley
- Parent(s): Dwight Foster; Henrietta Perkins Baldwin
- Relatives: Roger Sherman Baldwin, Roger Sherman

Roger Sherman Baldwin Foster (April 21, 1857 – February 22, 1924) was an American lawyer. He was instrumental in getting the charges against the Homestead Strike participants dropped.

== Early life and education ==
Foster was born in Worcester, Massachusetts. He was the son of Dwight Foster and Henrietta Perkins Baldwin, daughter of Connecticut Governor and US Senator Roger Sherman Baldwin, and the great-great grandson of Roger Sherman.

He attended Boston Latin School and the University of Marburg (1873-1874). In 1878, he graduated from Yale University, where he was a member of Skull and Bones, Psi Upsilon fraternity, and Linonia.

In 1880, having studied law in the office of Henry E. Davies and at Columbia, he received his LL.B. from Columbia Law School, and was admitted to the bar. In 1883 he earned his M.A. from Yale.

== Career ==
He began the practice of law in New York City in 1880. In 1888, he lectured at Yale on Federal Jurisprudence. He was appointed by Governor Flower to the Tenement House Commission in 1894.

He was the author of numerous legal pamphlets and treatises. An article he wrote for Albany Law Journal giving his opinion that there was no precedent for treason charges against Homestead Strike participants was instrumental in getting those charges dropped.

Foster died on February 22, 1924, and was buried in Kensico Cemetery.

== Family life ==
Foster was married to Laura Pugh Moxley on 22 February 1921 in Plainfield, New Jersey. They had one daughter, Laura Alice.
