= James Barker (judge) =

American judge (1839–1905)

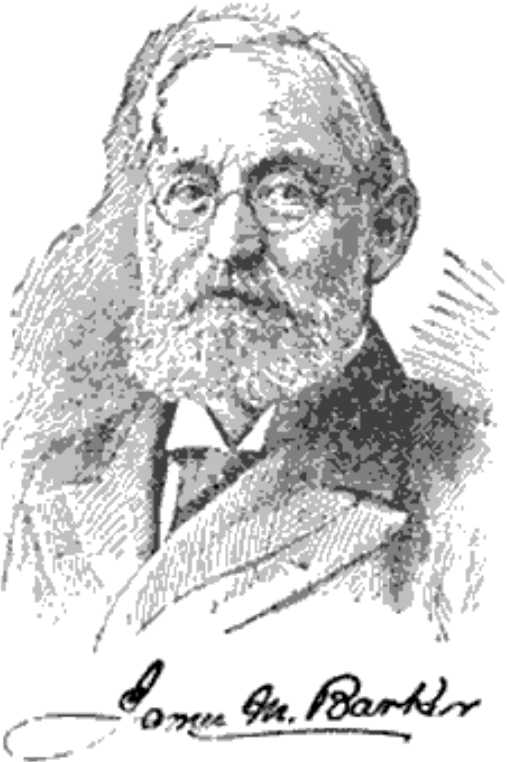
James Madison Barker.

James Madison Barker (October 23, 1839 – October 2, 1905) was a justice of the Massachusetts Supreme Judicial Court from 1891 to 1905. He was appointed by Governor William E. Russell.

Barker was born in Pittsfield, Massachusetts to John Vanderburgh, a woolen manufacturer whose American ancestry could be traced back to settlers of Rhode Island in 1663, and Sarah (Apthorp) Barker. The National Cyclopaedia of American Biography says of Barker:

Barker's education was exceptionally thorough; after attending various public, and private schools of Pittsfield and several Massachusetts academies he entered Williams College where he was graduated in 1860. He then took a course in the Harvard Law School and was admitted to the bar in 1863, receiving the degree of LL.D. from Yale College in 1891. In 1865 he formed a partnership with Maj. Charles N. Emerson, of Pittsfield, which continued until 1865, when he became associated with Thomas P. Pingree.

...

Barker's father, secured the insertion of a long and short haul freight clause in the act consolidating the Boston and Worcester and Western railroads into the Boston & Albany Railroad Co., and this clause was drafted by James Madison Barker, then a lawyer of three years' standing. Later, in 1876, it was extended to all railroads in the state, eventually becoming part of the interstate commerce act.

...

[Barker and Pingree] continued as partners until 1882 when Mr. Barker was nominated for the supreme court bench. In 1872 Mr. Barker went to the state legislature. He served on the committee on railroads, and on the commission to revise the state laws relative to taxation, and to revise the public laws of Massachusetts. The report of these commissioners became the public statutes of Massachusetts, enacted November 19, 1881. In 1880 he was chosen a delegate to the Republican national convention at Chicago, where, in the issue between the reformers of civil service and those who labored for its spoils, he worked zealously for its betterment and with gratifying results, as the civil service reform plank, was adopted. In 1882 he was appointed to the Massachusetts supreme court, and in 1891 to the supreme judicial court of Massachusetts. He made many contributions to literature worthy of lasting renown, among them "Shire Town Stories" (1890), being collections of narratives of bench and, bar, and biographical and historical papers. His love of nature and outdoor life was unbounded; fishing, hunting, tramping, golfing claimed all his leisure moments and few knew so well as he, the untrammeled beauties of his native county, Berkshire. Judge Barker possessed an analytical mind, eminently judicial, which won for him a long, and honorable career in the high station to which he was called. He was genial and ever fair-minded, with an attractiveness of manner and speech added to a reserve strength and firmness of character rarely combined. He was a director and in 1876 became vice-president of the Berkshire Life Insurance Co.; director of the Pittsfield National Bank and the Pontoosue Woolen Co.; president of the Berkshire Athenaeum (1903–05); and a trustee of Williams College. He was a member of the Society of the Sons of the American Revolution, the Massachusetts Historical Society, the Bunker Hill Monument Association, University Club of Boston, Union Club of Boston, Monday Evening Club of Pittsfield, D. K. E. fraternity, Oakley Country Club, Country Club of Pittsfield, and the Windsor Club of Windsor. Judge Barker was married, September 21, 1864, to Helena, daughter of Levi Whiting, of Bath, Steuben co., N. Y., and had seven children, five of whom survived him: Olive P., Sarah Elizabeth, Mrs. Harry G. Day, Mrs. Harlan H, Ballard, Jr., and John Barker.

Barker died in Boston, Massachusetts, while sitting as a single justice.

Political offices
Preceded by William Allen	Justice of the Massachusetts Supreme Judicial Court; 1891–1905	Succeeded by Henry Newton Sheldon
