= Augustus Soule =

American judge

Augustus Lord Soule

Associate Justice of the Massachusetts Supreme Judicial Court
- In office March 27, 1877 – April 11, 1881

Personal details
- Born: April 19, 1827 Exeter, New Hampshire, US
- Died: August 24, 1887 (aged 60) Franconia, New Hampshire, US
- Spouse: Mary Gray Soule
- Children: 2

Augustus Lord Soule (April 19, 1827 – August 24, 1887) was an American lawyer who served as a justice of the Massachusetts Supreme Judicial Court from 1877 to 1881.

Soule was born in Exeter, New Hampshire on April 19, 1827, to Gideon Lane Soule, the third principal of Phillips Exeter Academy. He attended Phillips Exeter, where he graduated in 1837, and went on to study at Harvard College, where he was in the same class as Senator George Frisbie Hoar, and from which he graduated in 1846. Soule later attended Harvard Law School. He was admitted to the bar in 1849. He lived in Chicopee, Massachusetts, then in two years moved to Springfield.

In 1877, Governor Alexander H. Rice appointed Soule to the Massachusetts Supreme Judicial Court, from which Soule later resigned in 1881.

Soule married Mary Gray Soule in 1853 in Springfield, with whom he had two daughters, Caroline and Mary Soule.

He died in Franconia, New Hampshire, on August 24, 1887, at the age of 60.

== See also ==
- 1873 Massachusetts legislature

Political offices
Preceded by Charles Devens	Justice of the Massachusetts Supreme Judicial Court; 1877–1881	Succeeded by Charles Devens
