= Elizabeth Knowlton =

American mountaineer and writer (1895–1989)

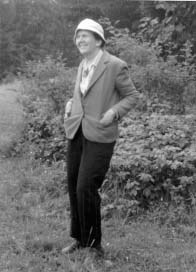
- Elizabeth Knowlton, ca. 1950s
- Born: October 23, 1895; Springfield, Massachusetts
- Died: January 29, 1989 (aged 93); Cambridge, Massachusetts
- Education: Vassar College; Radcliffe College
- Occupations: Mountaineer and writer
- Father: Marcus Perrin Knowlton

Elizabeth Knowlton (October 23, 1895 – January 29, 1989) was an American mountaineer and writer, who was one of the first female mountain climbers to climb above 20,000 feet in the Himalayas. Knowlton became internationally known as the only female climber in a German-American expedition that attempted to climb one of the highest peaks in the world, Nanga Parbat in Kashmir.

== Biography ==
Knowlton was born in Springfield, Massachusetts to Marcus Perrin Knowlton, Chief Justice of the Supreme Court of Massachusetts and Rose (Ladd) Knowlton.

She earned her AB degree in 1916 from Vassar College in New York before earning a master's degree in 1917 in English from Radcliffe College. When she was a child of 7, she began climbing in the White Mountains of New Hampshire. She gained fluency in German, French, Italian and Spanish, which would serve her well on alpine expeditions later in life. She climbed mountains in the Alps, Mexico and Canada.

In 1932 at age 37, she joined the German-American expedition to reach the peak of Kashmir's Nanga Parbat, the only woman to do so. The men in charge of the trip decided she should not climb higher than 20,000 feet in elevation. She was an active participant on the trip including the "two years of planning for the ascent, the work that went into preparation in Munich, the long journey by ship, rail, truck, pack horses and afoot, and the two and a half months of the actual climb." On the mountain, however, the plans were dashed by severe snow storms. From the mountain side, Knowlton sent news dispatches to the New York Times. Later she described the attempt in her book The Naked Mountain, published by Putnam in 1933.

After World War II, she participated on teams that made two ascents of the Sierra Nevada de Santa Marta range in Colombia. She made her last climb into the foothills of Nepal while in her 60's.

Knowlton died in Cambridge, Massachusetts on January 29, 1989 at the age of 93.

== Legacy ==
A collection of historical material of Knowlton's consisting of correspondence, verse and prose manuscripts, published material, diaries, notes, clippings, ephemera and photographs are held at the University of New Hampshire Library Special Collections and Archives.

== Memberships ==
Her memberships included

- Explorers Club
- Appalachian Mountain Club
- American Alpine Club
