= Leverett Hubbard =

American judge (1723–1793)

Leverett Hubbard (December 15, 1723 – January 2, 1793) was a justice of the New Hampshire Supreme Court from 1776 to 1785.

Born in Rhode Island, Hubbard was a son of Judge Nathaniel Hubbard of the superior court of Massachusetts. Rev. William Hubbard, the historian, and Governor John Leverett were among his ancestors.

Hubbard graduated from Harvard University in 1742, and then studied law in Rhode Island. He moved to Portsmouth, New Hampshire, about 1760, to practice his profession, and in 1762 was made comptroller of the customs, and in 1763 a judge of the New Hampshire Superior Court. He served until 1784, when the state constitution was revised and he was not re-appointed. He died in Portsmouth at the age of 69. In 1784 he was not reappointed, but was left in somewhat straitened circumstances. Some time before his death his mental powers became weakened.

He married, December 6, 1769, Anne, daughter of George Jaffrey and widow of Nathaniel Pierce, and left no descendants.

Political offices
Preceded by Newly established court	Justice of the New Hampshire Supreme Court; 1776–1785	Succeeded by Seat abolished
