= Justice Field (disambiguation) =

Justice Field refers to Stephen Johnson Field (1816–1899), associate justice of the United States Supreme Court.

Justice Field also may refer to either of the following justices of the Massachusetts Supreme Judicial Court:

- Fred Tarbell Field (1876–1950), associate Justice
- Walbridge A. Field (1833–1899), associate Justice and (presumably later) its Chief Justice
