= Edward A. Counihan =

American judge (1882–1961)

Edward Augustine Counihan Jr.
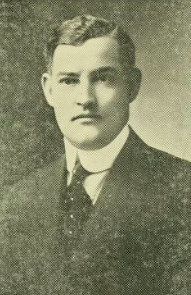

Personal details
- Born: August 1882 East Cambridge, Cambridge, Massachusetts
- Died: February 1, 1961 (aged 78) Cambridge, Massachusetts
- Education: Cambridge Latin School; Harvard College, A.B. (1904); Harvard Law School, LL. M. (1906)

Edward A. Counihan Jr. (1882 – February 1, 1961) was a justice of the Massachusetts Supreme Judicial Court from 1949 to 1960. He was appointed by Governor Paul A. Dever.

Born in Cambridge, Massachusetts, and raised in Dorchester, Counihan attended Cambridge Latin School, and received an undergraduate degree from Harvard College in 1904, followed by a law degree from Harvard Law School in 1906. Counihan and Dever were friends from childhood, and Counihan's later classmates included Franklin D. Roosevelt at Harvard College, and Felix Frankfurter at Harvard Law School.

Counihan was "active in city government" in Cambridge, and chaired the committee of arrangements of a charitable gala in 1909. He served in the Massachusetts Senate before becoming a judge. On March 23, 1921, Governor Channing H. Cox named Counihan to a seat on the District Court of East Cambridge, where Counihan remained for 28 years, before being named to the state supreme court in 1949. Counihan retired from the bench on November 23, 1960.

Counihan died at his home in Cambridge at the age of 78.

Political offices
Preceded by Arthur Dolan	Justice of the Massachusetts Supreme Judicial Court; 1949–1960	Succeeded by Paul G. Kirk Sr.
