= 1862 Massachusetts gubernatorial election =

- November 4, 1862
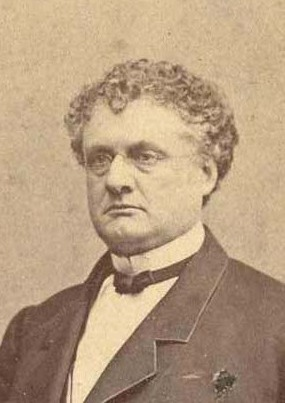

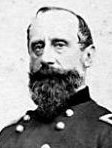
Nominee	John Albion Andrew	Charles Devens
Party	Republican	People's
Popular vote	79,835	54,167
Percentage	59.58%	40.42%
- County results Andrew: 50–60% 60–70% 70–80% Devens: 50–60%
Governor before election
John Albion Andrew
Republican
Elected Governor
John Albion Andrew
Republican

The 1862 Massachusetts gubernatorial election was held on November 4. Governor John Albion Andrew was re-elected to a third term in office over People's General Charles Devens.

== General election ==
=== Candidates ===
- John Albion Andrew, governor of Massachusetts since 1861 (Republican)
- Charles Devens, brigadier general of the 1st Massachusetts Infantry Regiment and former Whig state senator (People's)

=== Results ===
1862 Massachusetts gubernatorial election
Party	Candidate	Votes	%	±%
Republican	John Albion Andrew (incumbent)	79,835	59.58	▼8.03
People's	Charles Devens	54,167	40.42	▲8.03
Total votes		134,002	100.00	
Republican hold		Swing		

== See also ==
- 1862 Massachusetts legislature
