= Seth Ames =

American judge (1805–1881)

- Born: April 18, 1805
- Died: August 15, 1881 (aged 76)
- Occupation: Judge

Seth Ames (April 18, 1805 – August 15, 1881) was a justice of the Massachusetts Supreme Judicial Court from 1869 to 1881. He was appointed by Governor William Claflin.

== Biography ==
He was born April 18, 1805, and graduated from Harvard College in 1825. He was an associate justice of the Superior Court from 1859 to 1867, when he became chief justice of the Superior Court. In 1869, he was appointed to a seat on the Massachusetts Supreme Judicial Court. He resigned from the court on January 8, 1881, due to deteriorating health.

== Death and personal life ==
Ames died at Longwood, Massachusetts, in 1881, at the age of 76. He had several children by his wife Abigail, daughter of Rev Samuel Dana of Marblehead, Massachusetts. His father was Fisher Ames and his brother was John W. Ames.

== Works cited ==
- Hurd, Duane Hamilton (1884). History of Norfolk County, Massachusetts: With Biographical Sketches of Many of Its Pioneers and Prominent Men. J. W. Lewis & Company.

Political offices
Preceded by Dwight Foster	Justice of the Massachusetts Supreme Judicial Court; 1869–1881	Succeeded by Walbridge A. Field
