= William Gardner (Massachusetts judge) =

American judge (1827–1888)

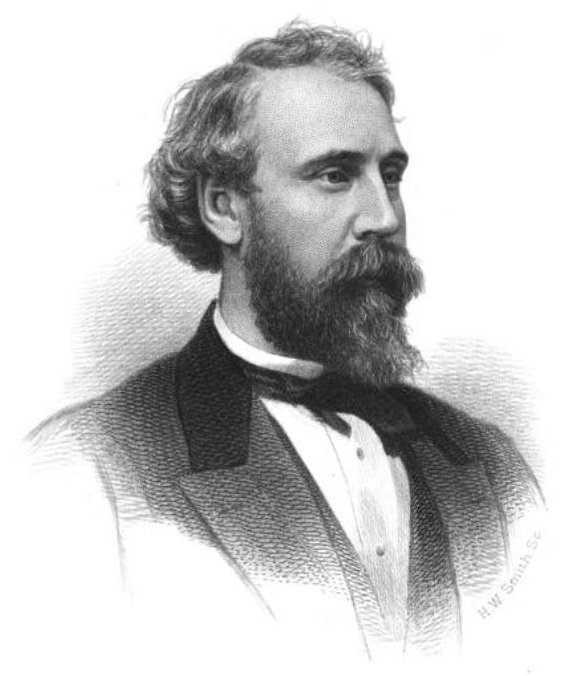

Justice of the Massachusetts Supreme Judicial Court
- In office 1885–1887

Personal details
- Born: William Sewall Gardner; October 1, 1827; Hallowell, Maine, US
- Died: April 4, 1888 (aged 60); Newton, Massachusetts, US
- Education: Bowdoin College
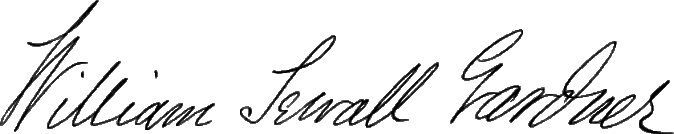
- Signature

William Sewall Gardner (October 1, 1827 – April 4, 1888) was a justice of the Massachusetts Supreme Judicial Court from 1885 to 1887. He was appointed by Governor George D. Robinson.

== Biography ==
Born in Hallowell, Maine, Gardner graduated from Bowdoin College and read law in Lowell, Massachusetts, gaining admission to the bar in 1852. He practiced law in partnership with Theodore H. Sweetser until 1875, when Gardner was appointed to the Massachusetts Superior Court, where he remained for ten years.

In October 1885, Governor George D. Robinson appointed Gardner to a seat on the state supreme court vacated by the death of Justice Waldo Colburn. Gardner served for less than two years. In March 1887, he attempted to carry out his judicial duties in hearing cases from the bench, but due to poor health was only able to attend court for one day before taking leave, intending to travel to Europe to recover. By June of that year, however, it was reported that Gardner has "completely lost his mind, and no hopes are entertained of his recovering it".

Gardner died at his home in Newton, Massachusetts at the age of 60.

Political offices
Preceded by Waldo Colburn	Justice of the Massachusetts Supreme Judicial Court; 1885–1887	Succeeded by Marcus Perrin Knowlton
