= Henry Newton Sheldon =

American judge (1842–1926)

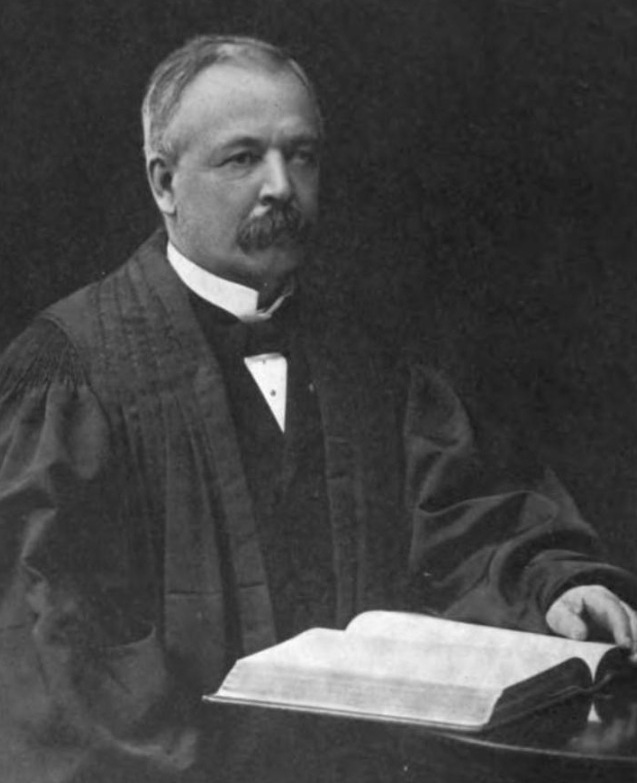

Associate Justice of the Massachusetts Supreme Judicial Court
- In office 1905–1915
- Appointed by: William Lewis Douglas
- Preceded by: James Barker
- Succeeded by: James Bernard Carroll

Personal details
- Born: June 28, 1842; Waterville, Maine, U.S.
- Died: January 14, 1926 (aged 83)
- Education: Harvard College
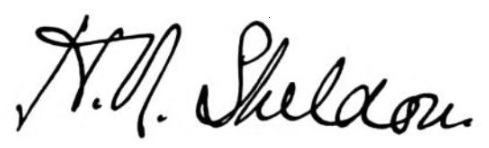
- Signature

Henry Newton Sheldon (June 28, 1842 – January 14, 1926) was a Massachusetts lawyer and judge who served as a justice of the Massachusetts Supreme Judicial Court from 1905 to 1915. He was appointed by Governor William Lewis Douglas.

== Early life, education, and military service ==
Born in Waterville, Maine, Sheldon's father was David Newton Sheldon, the president of Colby College from 1843 to 1853, and his mother was Rachel Howard Ripley. One of his brothers, Edward Stevens Sheldon, became Professor of Romance Languages at Harvard College. Sheldon himself graduated from Harvard College in 1863; he graduated first in a class including many future political leaders. Due to his industrious nature as a student, "he was facetiously nicknamed 'The Sluggard'" by friends. After leaving college, he taught private pupils and a school at Yarmouth for about a year, and then served in the 55th Massachusetts Infantry Regiment during the American Civil War, being commissioned a lieutenant by the end of his service.

After the war, he began reading law with Judge Josiah Gardner Abbott while working as a teacher, gaining admission to the bar in Suffolk County, Massachusetts, in 1866. In 1874 he formed a partnership with General Wilmon W. Blackmar, under the firm name of Blackmar & Sheldon, which partnership continued until 1894.

== Judicial service ==
On January 25, 1894, Sheldon was appointed to the Massachusetts Superior Court by Governor Frederic T. Greenhalge, who had been one of Sheldon's classmates at Harvard, and in 1905 was elevated to the state supreme court by Governor William Lewis Douglas. In 1908 Harvard conferred on him the honorary degree of LLD. He was elected to the American Academy of Arts and Sciences in 1913.

On December 18, 1914, Sheldon conveyed to the governor his resignation as of January 4, 1915, citing his age and long service as the reason. He remained active in legal matters following his resignation, and in the late 1910s and early 1920s, Sheldon was a member of the Bar Association grievance committee which prosecuted the disbarment proceedings against Daniel H. Coakley and William J. Corcoran, and the removal of District Attorneys Joseph C. Pelletier and Nathan A. Tufts.

== Personal life and death ==
On December 31, 1868, Sheldon married Clara P. Morse, the daughter of Augustus Morse of Hubbardston. They had two children, Alice, born in 1869, who died at the age of 10, and William Henry, born In 1874, who was graduated from Harvard in 1895.

Sheldon fell ill while visiting with Judge Crosby and Judge Pierce of the Supreme Court, and died at the Charlesgate Hotel in Boston at the age of 83.

Political offices
Preceded by James Barker	Justice of the Massachusetts Supreme Judicial Court; 1905–1915	Succeeded by James Bernard Carroll
