= Henry T. Lummus =

American judge (1876–1960)

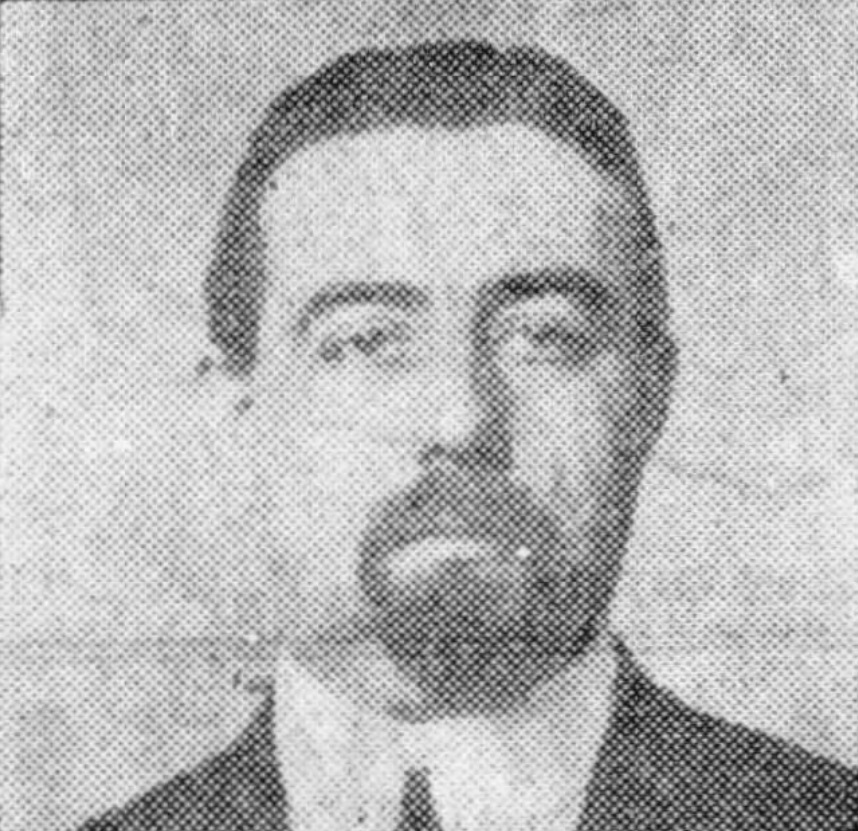
- Born: December 28, 1876; Lynn, Massachusetts, U.S.
- Died: August 29, 1960 (aged 83); Swampscott, Massachusetts, U.S.
- Education: Boston University School of Law
- Known for: Associate Justice of the Massachusetts Supreme Judicial Court
- Political party: Republican
- Spouse: Eleanor "Nellie" Tarbox (m. 1900)
- Children: 1

Henry Tilton Lummus (December 28, 1876 – August 29, 1960) was an American lawyer and judge. He served as an associate justice of the Massachusetts Supreme Judicial Court from 1932 to 1955, appointed by Governor Joseph B. Ely.

== Early life ==
Born in Lynn, Massachusetts, to William and Louisa Mitchell (Brown) Lummus, he attended Lynn Public Schools and graduated from Lynn Classical High School in 1894. He earned a Bachelor of Laws degree from the Boston University School of Law in 1897. He was a member of the Lynn school committee from 1899 to 1902 and was chairman in 1901. He was also a member of the 1917 Massachusetts constitutional convention.

== Legal career ==
Lummus began practicing law in the office of Arthur H. Wellman. In 1900, he formed a partnership in Lynn with Charles Neal Barney. He later had a partnership with William A. Bishop.

In 1903, he was appointed associate justice of the Lynn police court by Governor John L. Bates to fill the vacancy caused by the death of William Fabens. He was appointed presiding justice of the court four years later by Governor Curtis Guild Jr. Lummus authored a treatise on mechanic's liens that saw widespread use. In 1909, he wrote the Failure of Appeal System, which proposed reforms that were adopted by the Boston Municipal Court. Lummus wrote the Illegitimate Children act in 1913 and was chairman of the committee that drew up the small claims procedure in 1920–21.

In 1921, Lummus was appointed to the Massachusetts Superior Court by Governor Channing Cox to fill the vacancy caused by the retirement of Jabez Fox. During his first year on the bench, he presided over the trial of John Dies, Benjamin Gomes, and Joseph Andrews, three black men accused of raping a white woman. The trio were convicted and Lummus sentenced them to 20 to 25 years in prison, as he felt life imprisonment would be unfair due to their young ages. In 1932, William H. Lewis, sought a pardon for the men, contending that Gomes had had a consensual sexual relationship with Butler and Dies and Andrews were not involved at all. Lummus wrote to the pardon board on their behalf, stating "I can not say that my mind is free from doubt as to whether the true story has ever been revealed". Lewis' petition went unopposed and the trio were pardoned.

In 1925, Lummus presided over the trial of 12 men charged with crimes stemming from the Pickwick Club collapse. Lummus ordered a directed verdict of not guilty for 10 of the 12 defendants and the two remaining defendants were found not guilty. Following the verdict, Lummus stated that he concurred with the jury and "there never was sufficient evidence that these defendants had been willfully, recklessly or wantonly negligent”. That same year he presided over the first trial of Celestino Medeiros. Medeiros' conviction was overturned by the Massachusetts Supreme Judicial Court, which found that Lummus erred by not informing the jury that the defendant was presumed to be innocent until proven guilty. In 1931, he chaired a committee that wrote revised rules for the superior court.

In 1932, Governor Joseph B. Ely appointed Lummus to the Massachusetts Supreme Judicial Court after Felix Frankfurter declined the position. During his tenure on the Supreme Judicial Court, Lummus authored 1,136 opinions, including Commonwealth v. Welansky, which overturned Barnett Welansky's homicide conviction for the deaths caused by the Cocoanut Grove fire. He also presided over the disbarment proceedings against Lowell A. Mayberry. On September 21, 1955, Lummus submitted his resignation, effective October 1, to Governor Christian Herter.

== Personal life ==
On October 9, 1900, Lummus married Eleanor "Nellie" Tarbox in Lynn. They had one son.

Lummus had a collection of over 500 antique razors, was a wine connoisseur, and raised prized cats. In 1943, he received $500,000 from the estate of a former client, Mary B. Stevens. Stevens, 93, had been predeceased by her husband and son and left her $1.5 million estate to various associates, including Lummus.

Lummus died on at his home in Swampscott, Massachusetts, at the age of 83.

Political offices
Preceded by George A. Sanderson	Justice of the Massachusetts Supreme Judicial Court; 1932–1955	Succeeded by Arthur Whittemore
