= Waldo Colburn =

American judge (1824–1885)

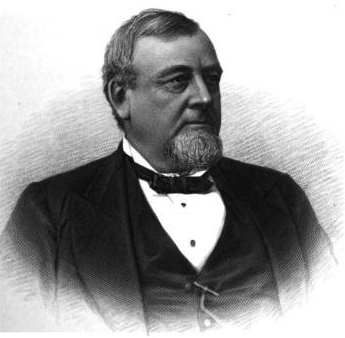

Member of the Massachusetts Senate from the 2nd Norfolk district
- In office 1879–1880

Member of the Massachusetts House of Representatives
- In office 1854–1854

Associate Justice of the Massachusetts Supreme Judicial Court
- In office November 10, 1882 – September 26, 1885
- Appointed by: John Davis Long
- Preceded by: William Crowninshield Endicott
- Succeeded by: William Sewell Gardner

Associate Justice of the Massachusetts Superior Court
- In office May 27, 1875 – November 10, 1882
- Appointed by: William Gaston
- Preceded by: Otis Phillips Lord

Personal details
- Born: November 13, 1824 Dedham, Massachusetts
- Died: September 26, 1885 (aged 60) Dedham, Massachusetts
- Party: Whig, Democratic
- Spouses: Elizabeth C. Sampson (m. 1851–1852); Mary Ellis Gay (m. 1852; died 1859) ,
- Children: 2
- Education: Phillips Andover
- Occupation: Attorney

Waldo Colburn (November 13, 1824 – September 26, 1885) was an American lawyer, jurist and politician from the Commonwealth of Massachusetts. Colburn was originally a member of the Whig party and after that party dissolved he became a Democrat. He was a descendant of Nathaniel Colburn, a selectman and signer of the Dedham Covenant.

== Legal career ==
Colburn attended Harvard Law School from 1848 to 1849 studied law in the office of Ira Cleveland, and was admitted to the Massachusetts Bar on May 3, 1850.

== Political career ==
In 1856 Colburn was elected to serve in the Massachusetts House of Representatives. He was a member of the Dedham, Massachusetts Board of Selectmen, Board of Assessors and, Overseers of the Poor. In 1857 he was the Chairman of the Committee on Parishes, Religious Societies, Etc. In 1858 he was the Chairman of the Committee on Railroads and Canals. In 1870 he was elected to the Massachusetts Senate for the second Norfolk district. He was also a member of the building committee that erected Memorial Hall.

== Judicial career ==
On May 27, 1875 Colburn was appointed as an associate justice of the Superior Court by Governor Gaston.

On November 19, 1882, Colburn was appointed by Governor Long as an associate justice of the Massachusetts Supreme Judicial Court. Colburn served as an associate justice of the Court until his death.

== See also ==
- 1870 Massachusetts legislature

Legal offices
Preceded by William Crowninshield Endicott	Associate Justice of the Massachusetts Supreme Judicial Court; 1882-1885	Succeeded by William Gardner
