= Charles DeCourcy =

American judge (1857–1924)

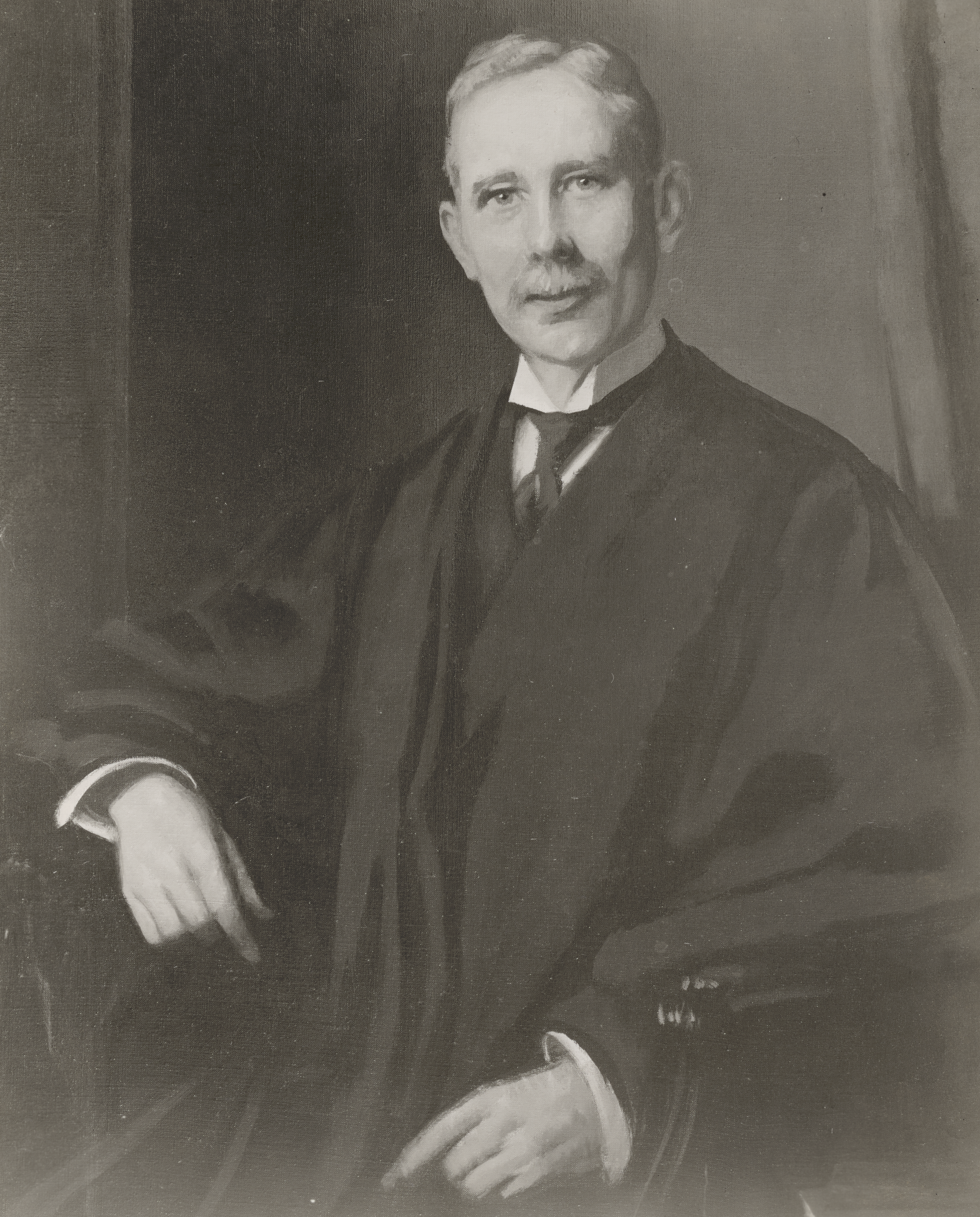
An illustration of DeCourcy for the Federal Art Project

Charles Ambrose DeCourcy (September 23, 1857 – August 22, 1924) was an American associate justice of the Massachusetts Supreme Judicial Court from 1911 to 1924. He was appointed by Governor Eugene Foss.

Born in Lawrence, Massachusetts, Decourcy earned a B.A. from Georgetown University in 1878 and a LL.B. from Boston University in 1880. In 1902, he was appointed to the Massachusetts Superior Court by Governor Winthrop M. Crane, and in 1911 was appointed to the Massachusetts Supreme Judicial Court, to succeed Arthur Prentice Rugg, who had been elevated to chief justice.

DeCourcy died of a heart attack at the Soo-Nipi Park Lodge golf course clubhouse in New London, New Hampshire, at the age of 67.

Political offices
Preceded by Arthur Prentice Rugg	Justice of the Massachusetts Supreme Judicial Court; 1911–1924	Succeeded by George A. Sanderson
