= Samuel Wilde =

American judge

Samuel Sumner Wilde (1771–1855) was an associate justice of the Massachusetts Supreme Judicial Court.

Wilde was born in Taunton, Massachusetts, and graduated from Dartmouth College in 1789, winning admission to the Massachusetts Bar in 1792. He practiced law in several towns of the state's Maine District before settling in Boston after Maine achieved statehood in 1820. In 1815 he was appointed to the Massachusetts Supreme Judicial Court (the state's highest), serving until he retired in 1850. He was the judge in the case of Baker v. Fales.

Wilde was a prominent attorney in Massachusetts and served as a justice of the Supreme Judicial Court. In 1814 he was elected as a representative to the Hartford Convention. Wilde was elected a Fellow of the American Academy of Arts and Sciences in 1825.

Legal offices
Preceded by Daniel Dewey	Associate Justice of the Massachusetts Supreme Judicial Court; 1815	Succeeded by George Bigelow
