= Nathan Cushing =

American judge (1742–1812)

Nathan Cushing (1742 – November 4, 1812) was a justice of the Massachusetts Supreme Judicial Court from 1790 to 1800. He was appointed by Governor John Hancock to the seat vacated by the elevation of Nathaniel Sargent to chief justice.

Born in Scituate, Massachusetts, Cushing received his law degree from Harvard College in 1763. Cushing supported independence during the American Revolution, and served as a delegate to the Plymouth County Congress in 1774, which issued a document condemning British violations of the right of colonists. He was an Admiralty Judge in 1776, and in 1788 was a delegate to the Massachusetts Ratifying Convention which, with Cushing, voted to adopt the Constitution of the United States.

Cushing was appointed to the Massachusetts Supreme Judicial Court in 1790, and served until his resignation in 1800.

Cushing married Abigail Tilden, with whom he had several children, three of whom survived him. He died at his home in Scituate at the age of 70.

Political offices
Preceded by Nathaniel Sargent	Justice of the Massachusetts Supreme Judicial Court; 1790–1800	Succeeded by Samuel Sewall
