= Nathaniel Peaslee Sargent =

American judge

Nathaniel Peaslee Sargent (frequently also spelled Sargeant, November 2, 1731 – October 12, 1791) was a justice of the Massachusetts Supreme Judicial Court from 1782 to 1791. He was the second Chief Justice of the court from 1790 to 1791, after the American revolution.

== Life ==
Nathaniel Peaslee Sargent was born in Methuen, Massachusetts on November 2, 1731 to Reverend Christopher Sargent and Susanna (Peaslee) Sargent. His father was descended from early settlers of Massachusetts. He entered Harvard College, graduating in 1750, and receiving a master's degree in 1753. He then began practicing law in Haverhill. In 1759 he married Rhoda Barnard of Salisbury, with whom he had seven children.

Sargent was elected in 1775 to the Massachusetts Provincial Congress (the de facto government of the province at the time). He was offered a position on the Massachusetts Superior Court of Judicature (the province's highest court) by the congress' council, where he would serve for the rest of his life. He was a charter member of the American Academy of Arts and Sciences (1780). Following the independence of the United States, he was appointed to be chief justice in 1790 by Governor John Hancock.

He died in 1791 in Haverhill.

Legal offices
New seat	Associate Justice of the Massachusetts Supreme Judicial Court; 1775–1790	Succeeded by Nathan Cushing
Preceded by William Cushing	Chief Justice of the Massachusetts Supreme Judicial Court; 1790–1791	Succeeded by Francis Dana
