= Marcus Perrin Knowlton =

American judge (1839–1918)

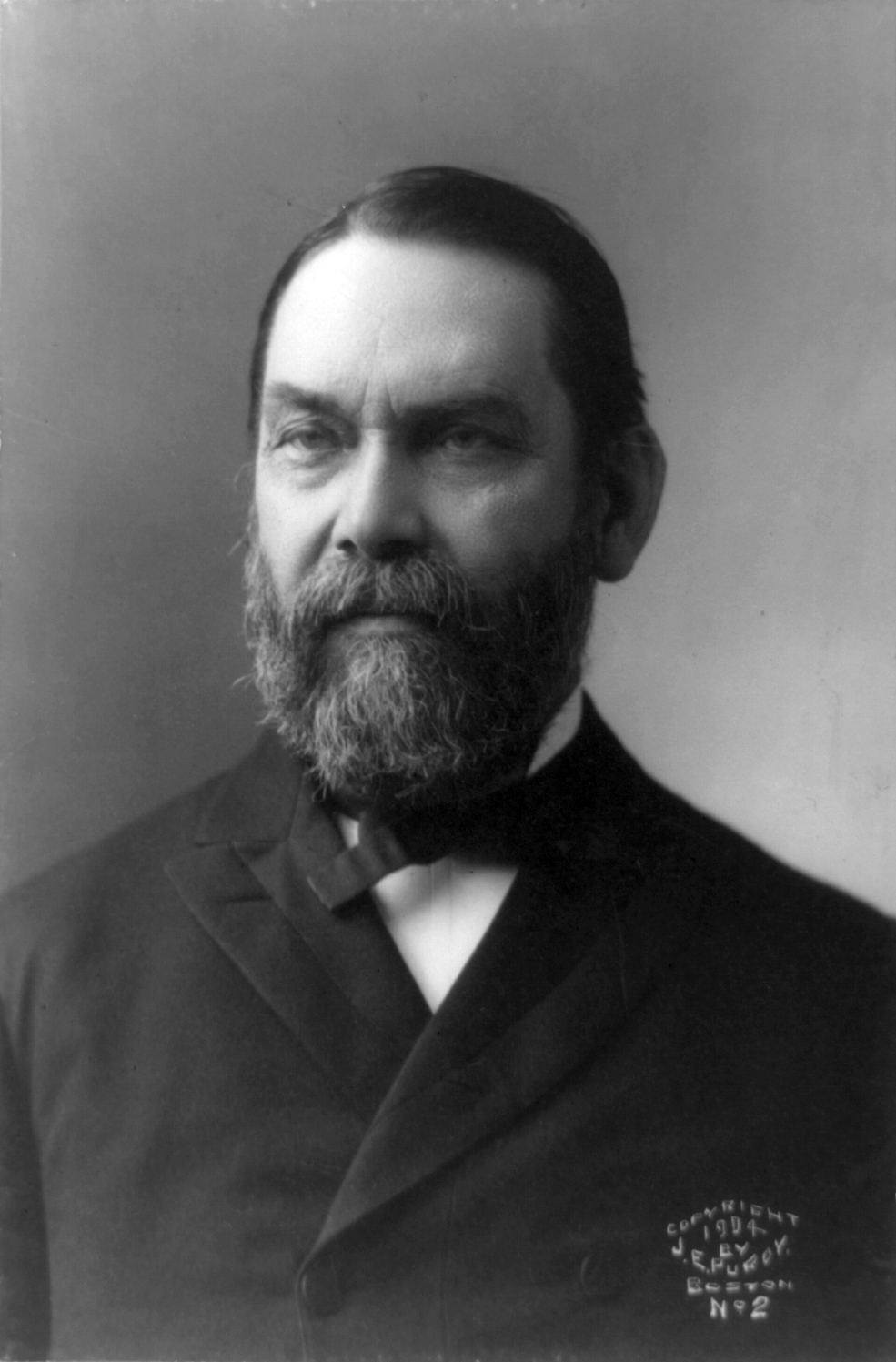
Marcus Perrin Knowlton

Marcus Perrin Knowlton (February 3, 1839 – May 7, 1918) was an American politician and jurist who served as chief justice of the Massachusetts Supreme Judicial Court.

== Biography ==
Marcus Perrin Knowlton was born in Wilbraham, Massachusetts, to Merrick and Fatima Knowlton. He graduated from Yale University in 1860 and was admitted to the bar in 1862 in Hampden County, where he made his residence in Springfield. He was elected to the City Council, and also represented Springfield in the Massachusetts House of Representatives as well as the Massachusetts Senate.

In 1881, he was appointed to the Massachusetts Superior Court. He was subsequently appointed to the Massachusetts Supreme Judicial Court in 1887. Following the appointment of Oliver Wendell Holmes Jr. to the United States Supreme Court in 1902, Knowlton took over as Chief Justice, and he held that position until he retired in 1911 due to failing eyesight.

He died at his home in Springfield on May 7, 1918.

== Personal life ==
He was married to Rose (Ladd) Knowlton and was the father of the acclaimed mountain climber, Elizabeth Knowlton.

== See also ==
- 1878 Massachusetts legislature

Legal offices
Preceded by William Gardner	Associate Justice of the Massachusetts Supreme Judicial Court; 1887-1902	Succeeded by Henry Braley
Preceded by Oliver Wendell Holmes Jr.	Chief Justice of the Massachusetts Supreme Judicial Court; December 8, 1902–September 7, 1911	Succeeded by Arthur Prentice Rugg
