= Arthur Prentice Rugg =

American judge (1862–1938)

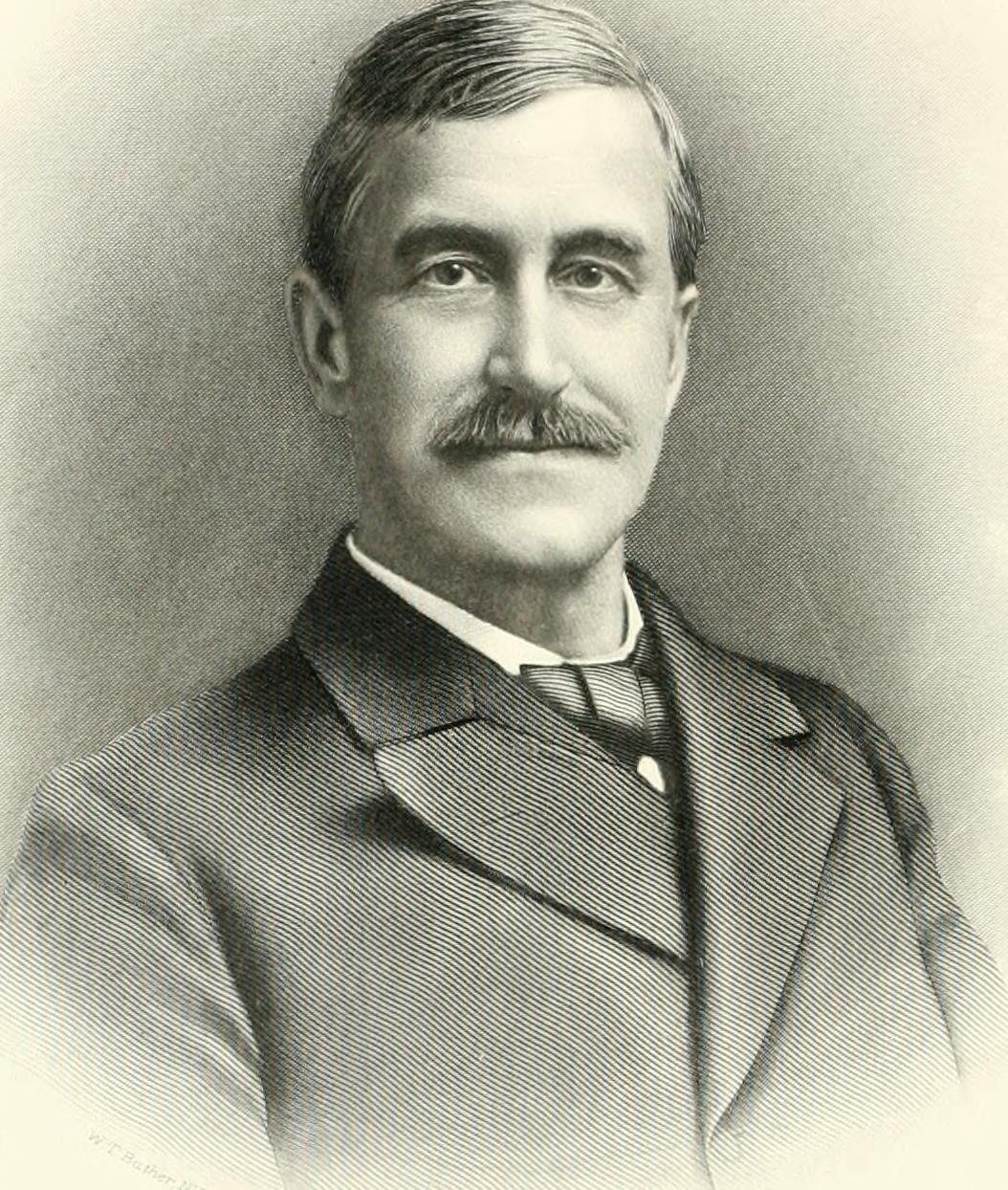
Arthur Prentice Rugg

Arthur Prentice Rugg (August 20, 1862 – June 12, 1938) was a justice of the Massachusetts Supreme Judicial Court from 1906 to 1938, serving as chief justice from 1911 to 1938. He was appointed by Governor Eugene Foss.

Rugg was born on August 20, 1862, in the town of Sterling, Massachusetts. He was one of five children of Prentice Mason Rugg and Cynthia Ross Rugg. Rugg attended and graduated from Lancaster High School in 1879, then from Amherst College in 1883 and finally from the Boston University School of Law in 1886. He was admitted to the bar in 1886.

Immediately after admittance, Rugg established his practice in Worcester, Massachusetts, with John R. Thayer. During this time, Rugg was involved in a number of political organizations. He was a member of Sterling's school committee from 1887. From 1888 to 1890 he was a trustee of the Sterling public library. He was a member of the Worcester city council in 1894 and was president of the group the next year.

In 1889, Rugg married Florence May Belcher. They had three children: sons Charles Belcher and Arthur Prentice Jr. and daughter Sidney H. Writ.

Rugg was elected city solicitor of Worcester in 1897. From this position, Massachusetts governor Curtis Guild Jr. appointed him to the Massachusetts Supreme Judicial Court as an associate justice on September 14, 1906. On September 13, 1911, Massachusetts governor Eugene Foss nominated Rugg to be Chief Justice of the Massachusetts Supreme Judicial Court. Rugg was the youngest person ever to receive that position.

He served on the court until his death, at his home in Sterling. He died of pneumonia.

Rugg received five honorary LL.D. degrees from schools in Massachusetts: Amherst College in 1908; Harvard University in 1914; Boston University in 1923; Williams College in 1924; Boston College in 1938.

Political offices
Preceded by John Lathrop	Associate Justice of the Massachusetts Supreme Judicial Court; 1906–1911	Succeeded by Charles DeCourcy
Preceded by Marcus Perrin Knowlton	Chief Justice of the Massachusetts Supreme Judicial Court; 1911–1938	Succeeded by Fred Tarbell Field
