= James Bernard Carroll =

American judge (1856–1932)

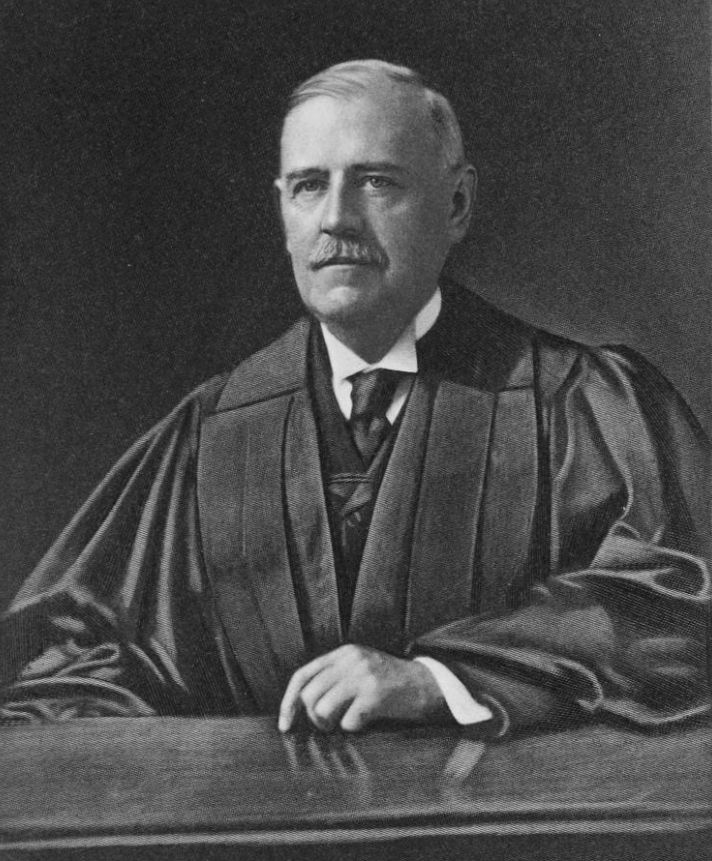

Associate Justice of the Massachusetts Supreme Judicial Court
- In office January 20, 1915 – January 8, 1932

Associate Justice of the Massachusetts Superior Court
- In office December 21, 1914 – January 20, 1915

Personal details
- Born: January 10, 1856 Lowell, Massachusetts
- Died: January 8, 1932 (aged 75) Springfield, Massachusetts
- Spouse: Mary E. Corbett (m. 1884)
- Education: College of the Holy Cross (AB); Boston University (LLB)
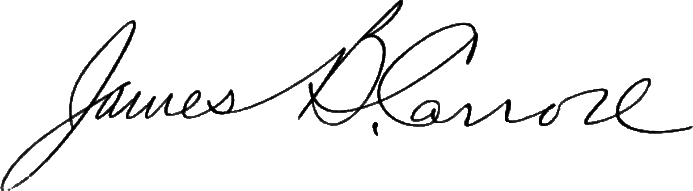
- Signature

James Bernard Carroll (January 10, 1856 – January 8, 1932) was an American lawyer who served as an associate justice of the Massachusetts Supreme Judicial Court from 1915 to 1932. He was appointed by Governor David I. Walsh. He had previously served as Associate Justice of the Massachusetts Superior Court from December 21, 1914 to January 20, 1915.

== Early life and education ==
Born in Lowell, Massachusetts, to Patrick and Bridget Carroll, after his father's death, his family moved to Worcester, Massachusetts, where he graduated from Worcester High School in 1874. As a young man he distributed copies of the Worcester Gazette, but decided against a career in newspaper work.

Carroll attended the College of the Holy Cross, while working as principal of an evening high school. He graduated from Holy Cross with a Bachelor of Arts degree in 1878 and then studied at Boston University School of Law, where he graduated cum laude with an LL.B. in 1880. He was admitted to the Worcester County bar that year.

== Legal and political career ==
In January 1881, Carroll opened a law office in Springfield, Massachusetts, where he practiced for more than three decades and developed a substantial practice in western Massachusetts. He was appointed Springfield city solicitor by Mayor Elisha B. Maynard in 1887 and joined the Democratic State Committee the following year.

Carroll was active in Democratic politics for a number of years. He was the Democratic candidate for lieutenant governor of Massachusetts in 1892, running with gubernatorial candidate William E. Russell. Russell was elected governor but Carroll was defeated. Carroll again ran for lieutenant governor in 1893, this time on the ticket headed by John E. Russell, but both candidates lost. He thereafter largely withdrew from candidacy for statewide office.

Carroll nevertheless continued to be considered for public office. In 1904 he declined the Democratic nomination for district attorney for the western district of Massachusetts, and several years later declined an offer of support from Democratic members of the state legislature for election to the United States Senate. In 1908 he ran for mayor of Springfield, losing a close election to William E. Sanderson.

Carroll later became chairman of the Massachusetts Industrial Accident Board, serving for more than two years before his appointment to the judiciary. His administration of the board drew praise from both labor organizations and employers. Governor David I. Walsh later cited Carroll's work there as evidence of his ability to resolve disputes through what Walsh described as a comparatively direct and inexpensive process, and emphasized Carroll's experience with the industrial issues then increasingly coming before the courts.

== Judicial career ==
Carroll had twice declined appointment to the Massachusetts Superior Court before eventually accepting a seat on that court in December 1914. Walsh appointed him on December 9, 1914, to fill the vacancy created by the elevation of Justice Edward P. Pierce to the Massachusetts Supreme Judicial Court. Carroll resigned as chairman of the Industrial Accident Board and took the oath of office at the Essex County courthouse on December 21, 1914.

His tenure on the Superior Court lasted only about a month. Following the retirement of SJC Justice Henry Newton Sheldon, Walsh nominated Carroll on January 20, 1915, to succeed him as an associate justice of the Supreme Judicial Court. Because Carroll had so recently been appointed to the Superior Court, Walsh said that he regarded the nomination essentially as a selection from the practicing bar rather than a promotion from long judicial service. Carroll's nomination was submitted to the Executive Council, where state law required it to remain for seven days before confirmation. He subsequently joined the Supreme Judicial Court and served from 1915 until his death in 1932.

== Personal life and death ==
Carroll married Mary E. Corbett, a teacher from Lowell, Massachusetts, on July 15, 1884.

He died from pneumonia at his home in Springfield, Massachusetts, on January 8, 1932, two days before his 76th birthday.

Political offices
Preceded by Henry Newton Sheldon	Justice of the Massachusetts Supreme Judicial Court; 1915–1932	Succeeded by Charles Donahue
