= Benjamin Lynde Jr. =

American judge (1700–1781)

Benjamin Lynde Jr. (October 5, 1700 – October 9, 1781) was a justice of the Massachusetts Superior Court of Judicature from 1745 to 1771, serving as chief justice from 1769 to 1771. He was appointed by Governor William Shirley.

Born in Salem, Massachusetts, His father, Benjamin Lynde Sr., was also an attorney and a judge. Lynde graduated Harvard University in 1718. In 1739 he was appointed Judge of the Inferior Court of Common Pleas for Essex County and in 1745 he was appointed to the Massachusetts Superior Court of Judicature as an associate justice. In 1769 he was appointed chief justice.

In 1771, he resigned from his position as Chief Justice and was appointed Judge of the Inferior Court of Common Pleas for Essex County. He held that position until his death on October 9, 1781.

Political offices
Preceded by Thomas Hutchinson	Chief Justice of the Massachusetts Superior Court of Judicature; 1769–1771	Succeeded by Peter Oliver
