= Henry Rugg =

Irish Anglican priest

Henry Rugg (1625–1671) was an Anglican priest in Ireland in the second half of the 17th century.

Rugg was born in Gloucester and educated at Magdalen College, Oxford. He was Dean of Cloyne from 1661 until his death.
