= Daniel Dewey =

American politician (1766–1815)

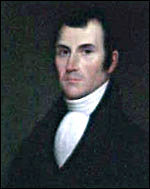

Member of the U.S. House of Representatives from Massachusetts's 12th district
- In office March 4, 1813 – February 24, 1814
- Preceded by: Ezekiel Bacon
- Succeeded by: John W. Hulbert

Personal details
- Born: January 29, 1766 Sheffield, Province of Massachusetts Bay, British America
- Died: May 26, 1815 (aged 49) Williamstown, Massachusetts, U.S.
- Party: Federalist
- Education: Yale College
- Profession: Lawyer

Daniel Dewey (January 29, 1766 – May 26, 1815) was a U.S. representative from Sheffield, Massachusetts.

== Career ==
Born in Sheffield in the Province of Massachusetts Bay, Dewey attended Yale College. He studied law. He was admitted to the bar in 1787 and commenced practice in Williamstown, Massachusetts. He was treasurer of Williams College, Williamstown, Massachusetts from 1798 to 1814. He served as member of the Massachusetts Governor's Council 1809–1812.

Dewey was elected as a Federalist to the Thirteenth Congress and served from March 4, 1813, until February 24, 1814, when he resigned, having been assigned to a judicial position. He was appointed by Governor Caleb Strong an associate judge of the Massachusetts Supreme Judicial Court on February 24, 1814, and served until his death in Williamstown, Massachusetts, May 26, 1815. He was interred in West Lawn Cemetery.

U.S. House of Representatives
Preceded by Ezekiel Bacon	Member of the U.S. House of Representatives from Massachusetts's 12th congressional district March 4, 1813 – February 28, 1814	Succeeded by John W. Hulbert
Legal offices
Preceded by Samuel Sewall	Associate Justice of the Massachusetts Supreme Judicial Court; 1814–1815	Succeeded by Samuel Wilde
