= Charles B. Rugg =

US Assistant Attorney General from 1930 to 1933

United States Assistant Attorney General for the Civil Division
- In office 1930–1933
- President: Herbert Hoover
- Preceded by: Herman J. Galloway
- Succeeded by: George Clinton Sweeney

District attorney of Worcester County, Massachusetts
- In office 1926–1930
- Preceded by: Emerson W. Baker
- Succeeded by: Edwin G. Norman

Personal details
- Born: January 20, 1890 Worcester, Massachusetts, U.S.
- Died: November 26, 1962 (aged 72) Boston, Massachusetts, U.S.
- Party: Republican
- Spouse: Marjory L. Boynton (m. 1917)
- Children: 2
- Education: Amherst College; Harvard Law School
- Occupation: Attorney

Charles Belcher Rugg (January 20, 1890 – November 26, 1962) was an American attorney who served as United States Assistant Attorney General from 1930 to 1933.

== Early life ==
Rugg was born on January 20, 1890, in Worcester, Massachusetts. His father, Arthur Prentice Rugg, was chief justice of the Massachusetts Supreme Judicial Court from 1911 to 1938. Rugg attended Worcester Public Schools and graduated from Worcester Classical High School in 1907. He earned his bachelor of arts and degree from Amherst College in 1911 and his bachelor of laws from Harvard Law School in 1914. He helped organize the Harvard Legal Aid Bureau and was its president from 1913 to 1914. On November 8, 1913, Rugg tried the association's first court case. On June 21, 1917, Rugg married Marjory L. Boynton of Brookline, Massachusetts.

== Career ==
Rugg was admitted to the bar in 1914 and was associated with the firm Sibley, Sibley & Blair. That same year, he was elected to represent Ward 4 on the Worcester common council.

On October 5, 1917, Rugg enlisted in the United States Naval Reserve. He was ordered to the cadet school of the First Naval District in Cambridge, Massachusetts. He was commissioned as an ensign on January 3, 1918 and ordered to the Bureau of Ordnance at the Washington Navy Yard.

In 1920, Rugg was appointed a United States Commissioner. He resigned the following year to become an assistant district attorney. He was elected district attorney in 1926.

On January 31, 1930, president Herbert Hoover nominated Rugg for the position of Assistant Attorney General. This position defended the United States in claims against the government in the United States Court of Claims and United States district courts. He personally argued cases before the United States Supreme Court, something previously done by lower-raking attorneys.

In 1933, Rugg entered private practice in Boston with the firm of Ropes, Gray, Best, Coolidge and Rugg. In 1934, he was appointed a special assistant attorney general to represent the Commonwealth in the Millen-Faber case. In 1935, he represented five textile firms that challenged the collection of $2 million in taxes imposed by Agricultural Adjustment Act as unconstitutional. In 1939, he represented Massachusetts public works commissioner William F. Callahan in his removal hearings. The following year, he represented the Old Colony Railroad before the Interstate Commerce Commission. In 1943, United States Attorney General Francis Biddle appointed Rugg as a special assistant to represent the U.S. government in its antitrust suit against the Associated Press. In 1944, Rugg represented Husband E. Kimmel, commander of the United States Navy forces in Hawaii during the attack on Pearl Harbor, during the Naval Court of Inquiry's investigation into the attack. In 1949, Rugg was appointed by the Boston Bar Association to present evidence of unethical practices by lawyers working in Suffolk County, Massachusetts to the Massachusetts Supreme Judicial Court's special commissioner.

Rugg led Republican nominee Thomas E. Dewey's campaign in Massachusetts during the 1948 United States presidential election. In 1949, Republicans chose Rugg to lead its effort to keep an initiative petition baring parochial school students from public school busses off the ballot. The following year, he co-authored the Sears–Rugg bill, which provided these students with public funds for transportation.

In 1958, Rugg represented the Fall River Cotton Manufacturers during labor negotiations.

== Death ==
Rugg died on November 26, 1962 at Massachusetts General Hospital. He was survived by his wife and two daughters.
