= Arthur Dolan =

American judge (1876–1949)

Arthur Walter Dolan (September 22, 1876 – September 28, 1949) was a justice of the Massachusetts Supreme Judicial Court from 1937 to 1949. He was appointed by Governor Charles F. Hurley.

== Personal life ==
Dolan was born in Boston on September 22, 1876, to John Dolan, an Irish immigrant, and Delia Murphy Dolan, an English immigrant. He attended the Boston Public Schools and then was graduated from Boston College in 1897. Harvard Law School conferred a bachelor of laws degree in 1900 and he received a doctor of laws degree from Boston College in 1922.

On September 29, 1903, Dolan married Christine M. Barr and they had five children. (Note: Barr was the daughter of Michael Barr and Mary McLaughlin Barr of Boston.)

== Career ==
From 1900 to 1905, Dolan served on the Boston Common Council, and as presideing officer from 1902 to 1905. The following year, he chaired the commission that divided Suffolk County into representative districts, and then in 1907 became secretary to Boston Mayor John F. Fitzgerald. At the election in 1907, he was chosen as Register of Probate for Suffolk County and served in that capacity until 1922. Governor Channing Cox appointed him a probate judge on November 29, 1922.

On October 8, 1937, Governor Charles F. Hurley appointed Dolan as an associate justice of the Supreme Judicial Court. Upon his appointment, the Boston Bar Association unanimously adopted the following resolution:

Voted: That the Council of the Bar Association of the City of Boston notes with gratification the report of the choice of His Excellency, the Governor, of Hon. Arthur W. Dolan, Judge of the Probate Court in Suffolk County, to become an associate justice of the Supreme Judicial Court. The elevation is warranted by the excellent performance of his judicial duties in his present position and by his learning and capacity. The Council is confident that such a choice is destined to meet with widespread approval. The Council recommends to His Excellency, the Governor, the making of this appointment.

It was the first, and as of his death the last, time the Association had ever made that type of statement of a candidate who had been merely nominated. While on the SJC, he wrote 492 opinions, including 172 dealing with probate matters.

Dolan served on the high court until August 20, 1949.

== Notes ==
Political offices
Preceded by John Crawford Crosby	Justice of the Massachusetts Supreme Judicial Court; 1937–1949	Succeeded by Edward Counihan
