= Nathaniel Hubbard =

American judge (1680–1748)

Coat of Arms of Nathaniel Hubbard

Nathaniel Hubbard (October 13, 1680 – 1748) was a justice of the Massachusetts Superior Court of Judicature from 1745 to 1746. He was appointed by Governor William Shirley. Hubbard was the grandson of early Massachusetts historian and clergyman William Hubbard, and was for many years resident in Bristol, then part of Bristol County, Massachusetts and now in Rhode Island.

Hubbard was born in 1680 to John and Ann (Leverett) Hubbard in Ipswich, Massachusetts. As a young man he moved to Braintree before relocating to Dorchester and then Bristol. He graduated from Harvard College in 1698. In about 1707 he married Elizabeth Nelson. In Dorchester he was active in civic affairs, serving as a local magistrate, and owned extensive real estate, extending into Dedham. He was also a proprietor of a large tract of land in Maine. In Bristol he was appointed a judge of the court of common pleas in 1728, and was appointed a judge of the admiralty court for Bristol County and all of Rhode Island in 1729.

Political offices
Preceded by Paul Dudley	Justice of the Massachusetts Superior Court of Judicature; 1745–1746	Succeeded by John Cushing Jr.
