= Benjamin Lynde Sr. =

American judge (1666–1749)

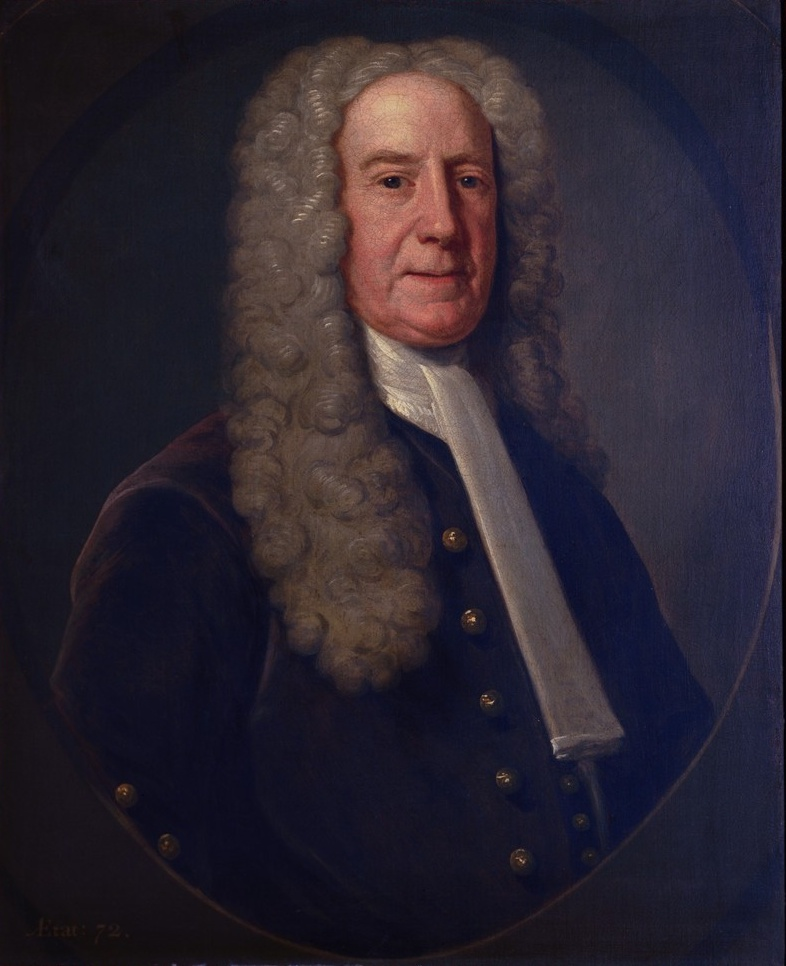
- portrait by John Smibert
- Born: 22 September 1666
- Died: 28 January 1745 (aged 78)
- Alma mater: Harvard College
- Occupation: Judge
- Spouse(s): Mary Browne Lynde
- Children: Benjamin Lynde Jr.

Benjamin Lynde (September 22, 1666 – January 28, 1745) was a lawyer and magistrate of the Province of Massachusetts Bay. Born in Salem, he was sent to England by his parents, where he read law at the Middle Temple. He was the first Chief Justice (appointed associate 1712, chief justice 1729) of the Massachusetts Superior Court of Judicature, the province's highest court, to have formal training as a lawyer. Lynde's family gave its name to the town of Lyndeborough, New Hampshire, established in an area where they had extensive land holdings. His son Benjamin Jr. also served as a Massachusetts chief justice. He is buried at the Salem Burying Point amongst other prominent historical figures of the time.

Legal offices
Preceded by John Walley	Associate Justice of the Massachusetts Superior Court of Judicature; 1712–1728	Succeeded by John Cushing Sr.
Preceded by Samuel Sewall	Chief Justice of the Massachusetts Superior Court of Judicature; 1729–1745	Succeeded by Paul Dudley
