= John Cushing Jr. =

American judge (1795–1778)

John Cushing Jr. (July 17, 1695 – March 19, 1778) was a lawyer and judge in Colonial Massachusetts and political figure who served as a justice of the Massachusetts Supreme Judicial Court from 1747 to 1771. He was appointed by Governor William Shirley.

He also served in the Massachusetts House of Representatives intermintantly starting in 1725 and served in the Massachusetts Governor's Council from 1746 to 1763. He was also a judge on the Massachusetts Probate and Family Court from 1738 to 1746 in Plymouth County.

He was born in Scituate, Massachusetts and graduated from Harvard College in 1711. Sometimes referred to as John Cushing III, his father, John Cushing, had previously served on the same court, and his son, William Cushing, also later served on the court, and on the Supreme Court of the United States.

Political offices
| Preceded by Nathaniel Hubbard | Justice of the Massachusetts Supreme Judicial Court; 1747–1771 | Succeeded by Court reorganized |
