= John Lathrop (judge) =

American judge

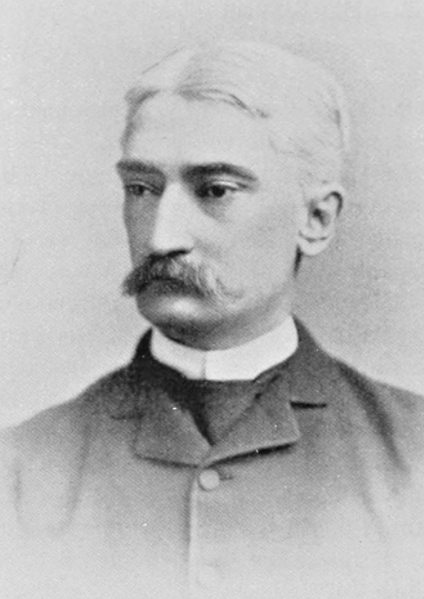

Associate Justice of the Massachusetts Supreme Judicial Court
- In office 1891–1906

Personal details
- Born: February 8, 1835 Boston, Massachusetts, US
- Died: August 24, 1910 (aged 75) Dedham, Massachusetts, US
- Resting place: Brookdale Cemetery
- Education: Harvard Law School
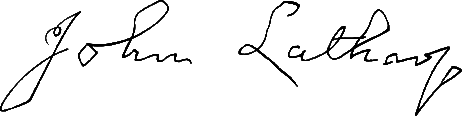
- Signature

John Lathrop (February 8, 1835 – August 24, 1910) was an associate justice of the Supreme Judicial Court of Massachusetts.

== Early life and education ==
Lathrop was born in Boston, Massachusetts, on February 8, 1833, to Rev. John P. Lathrop and Maria Margaretta (née Long) Lathrop. His father was the minister of the Allin Congregational Church in Dedham, Massachusetts. Other ancestors, also with the name John Lathrop, were among the original pilgrims of Plymouth Colony and the minister at Second Church, Boston.

Lathrop attended the Dedham Public Schools and then Burlington College in New Jersey, receiving a degree in 1853. He then attended Harvard Law School and was graduated in 1855. He received an honorary doctor of laws degree in 1906 from Williams College.

== Career ==
After graduation, Lathrop entered the law offices of Charles C. Francis and William Caleb Loring in Boston. He was admitted to the bar in 1856.

In 1862, after the outbreak of the Civil War, Lathrop joined the Dedham Company of the 35th Massachusetts Infantry Regiment as a captain. He fought at the Battle of South Mountain, at Antietam, and at the Battle of Fredericksburg.

In the fall of 1863, he contracted malaria and resigned on November 13, 1863. In 2020, the letters he and his brothers, who also served in the Union Army, sent to their mother were transcribed and published by the Dedham Historical Society.

Lathrop returned to the law and specialized in maritime law. In March 1874, Governor Emory Washburn appointed him as the reporter of the Supreme Judicial Court. In this position, he began the custom of reporting decisions as they were handed down, and not in the order in which they were heard.

In 1888, he was appointed as a judge of the Superior Court by Governor Oliver Ames and was placed on the Supreme Judicial Court by Governor William E. Russell in 1891.

Lathrop resigned as justice on September 11, 1906, as a result of failing health. He was also a lecturer at Harvard and Boston University School of Law.

== Personal life ==
Lathrop was a member of the Union Club of Boston and the St. Botolph Club, serving as president of the former from 1905 to 1907. He died August 24, 1910, in Dedham and his ashes are buried in Brookdale Cemetery.
