= Charles Jenney =

American judge

Charles Francis Jenney (1860–1923) was an American politician from the U.S. state of Massachusetts. He served most notably as justice of the Massachusetts state supreme court from 1919 until 1923.

== Biography ==
Charles Francis Jenney was born in Middleboro, Massachusetts on September 16, 1860 to Charles Edwin Jenney and Elvira Frances Clark. He graduated from law school at Boston University, immediately teaching there following graduation in 1883. He practiced law until 1909.

In 1886, he was elected to the Massachusetts state house of representatives. In 1907, he joined the Massachusetts state senate. In 1909, he gave up the law after being appointed to the Massachusetts Superior Court. In 1919, Governor Calvin Coolidge appointed Jenney to the Massachusetts state supreme court. Jenney died in Boston, Massachusetts on November 29, 1923.

He contributed to American ornithology through his observations and communications as a member of the American Ornithologists Union, the Nuttall Ornithological Club and Charles Johnson Maynard's bird walks.
