= Fred Tarbell Field =

American judge (1876–1950)

Fred Tarbell Field (December 24, 1876 – July 23, 1950) was an associate justice of the Massachusetts Supreme Judicial Court from January 30, 1929 until he became chief justice on June 30, 1938, serving in that capacity until his resignation on July 24, 1947. He was appointed by Governor Charles F. Hurley.

When Oliver Wendell Holmes Jr. retired from the Supreme Court in 1932, Field may have been considered by President Herbert Hoover as a possible replacement; however, the seat went to Benjamin N. Cardozo.

Born and raised in Springfield, Vermont and graduated from Vermont Academy in 1895, Field read law to gain admission to the Massachusetts State Bar. He was the nephew of Walbridge Abner Field, who was also an associate justice and chief justice of the Massachusetts Supreme Judicial Court. Following his admission to the Bar, Field worked in the office of Massachusetts Attorney General Herbert Parker as a law clerk from 1903 to 1904, and as an assistant attorney general from 1905 to 1912, working in the subsequent administrations of Attorneys General Dana Malone and James M. Swift. He then entered private practice in association with Parker in Boston. From 1918 to 1919, Field was a member of the legal staff in the Bureau of Internal Revenue, during which time he helped organize the Advisory Tax Board of the Treasury Department. In 1919, Field returned to Boston and became a partner in the firm of Goodwin, Procter, Field and Hoar, where he remained until his appointment to the state supreme court.
