= Marek (surname) =

Marek is a surname. Notable people with the surname include:

== Sports ==
- Henryk Marek (born 1939), Polish cross-country skier
- Jan Marek (ice hockey, born 1947), American ice hockey player
- Jan Marek (ice hockey, born 1979) (1979–2011), Czech ice hockey player
- Josef Marek (born 1987), Czech footballer
- Kamel Marek (born 1980), Algerian footballer
- Krzysztof Marek (born 1949), Polish rower
- Marcus Marek (born 1961), American football player
- Václav Marek (footballer) (born 1981), Czech football goalkeeper

== Other people ==
- Christine Marek (born 1968), Austrian politician
- Czesław Marek (1891–1985), Polish composer
- Franz Marek (1913–1979), Austrian communist politician
- George Richard Marek (1902–1987), American biographer of classical composers
- Jan Jindřich Marek (1803–1853), also known as Jan z Hvězdy, Czech priest and poet
- Jeff Marek (born 1969), Canadian television personality and radio host
- Jiří Marek (1914–1994), Czech writer
- John Marek (born 1940), Welsh Conservative politician
- John Marek (murderer) (1961–2009), American death row inmate at Florida State Prison
- József Marek (1868–1952), Hungarian veterinarian
- Larry Marek (born 1940), Democratic politician
- Oldřich Marek (1911–1986), Czech entomologist and teacher
- Richard Marek (1933–2020), American writer, editor, and publisher
- Stella Marek Cushing (1893–1938), American folklorist, violinist
- Tadek Marek (1908–1982), Polish-British engineer
- Tadeusz Marek, pen name of Tadeusz Żakiej (1915–1994), Polish musicologist
- Václav Marek (writer) (1908–1994), Czech writer, traveller, publicist and researcher of Saami languages
- Victor W. Marek (born 1943), Polish mathematician and computer scientist
- Voitre Marek (1919–1999), Czech-born Australian artist, brother of Dusan

== Fictional characters ==
- Volunteer Marek from The Good Soldier Švejk

== See also ==
- Marek (given name)
