= Cushing (surname) =

Surname list

Cushing is a surname. Notable people with the surname include:

- Alonzo Cushing (1841–1863), U.S. Army officer and recipient of the Medal of Honor
- Arthur Cushing (1869–1944), Canadian politician
- Brian Cushing (born 1987), American football player
- Caleb Cushing (1800–1879), US legislator
- Charles Cushing (1905–1982), American composer
- Charles Stuart Cushing (1867–1946), American attorney
- Christine Cushing, Canadian celebrity chef
- David Cushing (1920–2008), British fisheries biologist
- Donna Cushing, Welsh politician
- Edmund L. Cushing (1807–1883), chief justice of the New Hampshire Supreme Court
- Eliza Lanesford Cushing (1794–1886), American-Canadian author and editor
- Eloise B. Cushing (1887–1977), American attorney
- Frank Hamilton Cushing (1857–1900), American anthropologist
- Harvey Cushing (1869–1939), pioneer American neurosurgeon
- Jack Cushing (born 1996), American baseball player
- James M. Cushing (1908–1963), US Army mining engineer
- James T. Cushing (1937–2002), American physicist and philosopher of science
- John Cushing (actor) (1719–1790), British stage actor
- John Perkins Cushing (1787–1862), American merchant and philanthropist
- Luther Cushing (1803–1856), author of one of the earliest works on parliamentary procedure
- Nathan Cushing (1742–1812), Justice of the Massachusetts Supreme Judicial Court
- Nick Cushing, English football manager
- Otho Cushing (c. 1820–1942), American artist
- Peter Cushing (1913–1994), British actor
- Robert Cushing (sculptor) (1841–1896), Irish sculptor
- Renny Cushing (1952–2022), American politician
- Richard Cushing (1895–1970), American Cardinal of the Roman Catholic Church
- Stella Marek Cushing (1893–1938), American folklorist, violinist
- Stephen B. Cushing (died 1868), New York State Attorney General 1856–1857
- Thomas Cushing (1725–1788), American lawyer and statesman
- William Cushing (1732–1810), Associate Justice of the U.S. Supreme Court
- William B. Cushing (1842–1874), U.S. Navy officer
- William Henry Cushing (1852–1934), Canadian politician
- William Orcutt Cushing (1823–1902), American Unitarian minister and hymn writer
- Zattu Cushing (1771–1839), American shipbuilder and judge
- Josiah Nelson Cushing (1840–1905), Missionary and Scholar, Burma; author of the first Shan-English Dictionary and others
