= Manndorff zu Pfannhofen und Wissenau =

von und zu Manndorff zu Pfannhofen und Wissenau
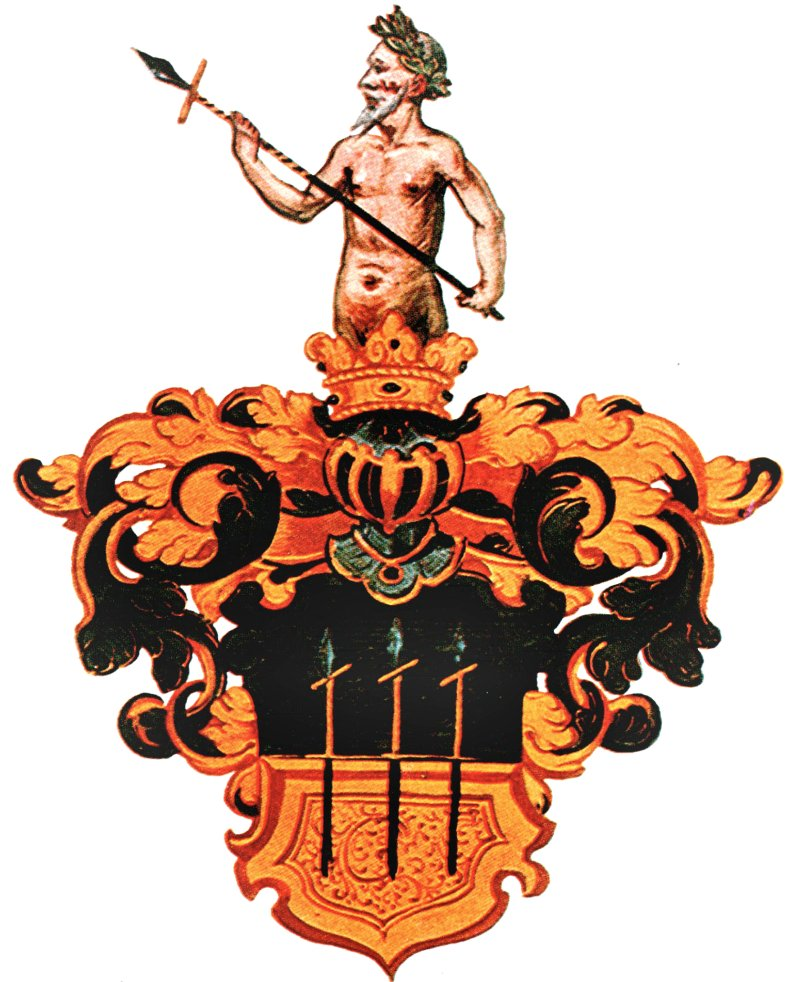
- -->
- Country: Austria, Crownland Carinthia, Holy Roman Empire
- Founded: 12th century
- Titles: Reichs- und erbländisch-österreichische Freiherrenstand (Free lords of the realm and inherited Austrian lands); Freiherr / Freiin (free lord / free lady); Baron / Baronesse; "Euer" Hochgeboren (Your High-Born)
- Cadet branches: Wissenau; Pfannhofen

The Manndorff zu Pfannhofen und Wissenau family is an ancient Austrian noble family, more specifically the Uradel (old nobility). They are among the oldest Carinthian noble families still in existence today.

== Origin ==
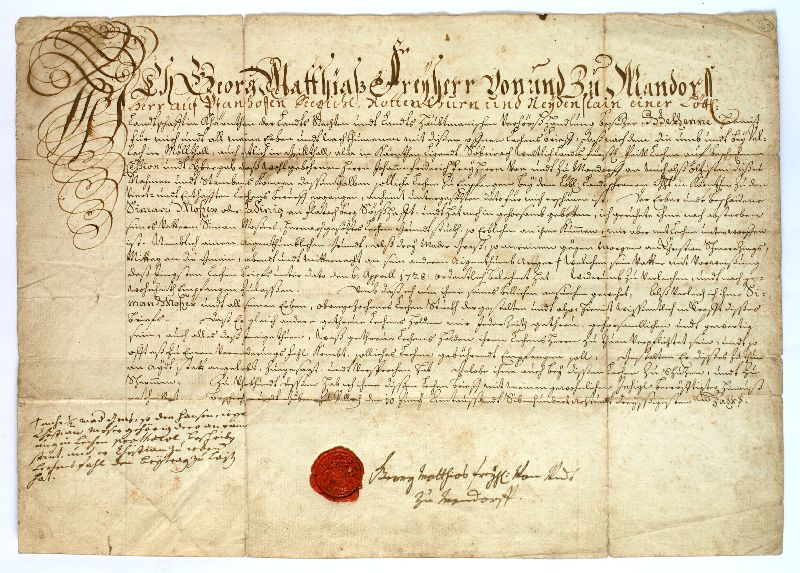

Besides the Metnitz family, the Manndorffs are the oldest non-extinct family belonging to Carinthian nobility. The spelling of the name changed between Manndorff, Manndorf, Mandorf, Mondorf, Monsdorf, Mansdorf, and Manstorff.

The first bearer of the name, Harte Manus miles de Mondorf, appears mentioned in February 1214 before Acre in the Kingdom of Jerusalem as a witness to a deed of gift from the Wicard of Karlsperg, who transferred one of his Carinthian estates to the St. Johannis hospital in Jerusalem. Besides this Manndorff other members of long-established Carinthian nobility, namely Silberberg, Gurniz and Perneck—who were on a pilgrimage in the Holy land with the Wicard of Karlsperg--, were also witnesses to the deed. The exact origin of this first Manndorff and his ancestors remains unclear.

In a legend—written down in the castle of Manndorf in the year of 1688 by Freiherr Georg Siegmund, Baron von und zu Manndorff—titled "Manndorferischem Stamen Paumb" (loosely translated from German "Family Tree of the Manndorff's"), the Duke of Württemberg in 1118 acquainted a big and wild man, who the Prince married to a tall woman. After they had many children, most of them male, the Prince gave them all a village and called them Manndorff. Thereafter the Prince of Württemberg had a war for which he called onto many Manndorff's, who measured well and honorable in battle. The Prince then upraised the Manndorffs to nobility, and in the shield (referring to the coat of arms), gave them a naked, wild brave man including 3 spears. There is no historical evidence for this story.

Many more Manndorffs are documented in Carinthia in the 13th and the 14th century and the family is documented in the official Carinthian nobility register of the years 1446.

Hans von und zu Manndorf, Lord on Manndorf, Gurnitz, Waldenstein, Wiesenau, and Flaschberg, Imperial General Collector in Carinthia, was recorded on January 3, 1625, in the country council of Carniola.

The Manndorffs received the status of "Reichs- und erbländisch-österreichische Freiherrenstand" (Free lords of the realm and inherited Austrian lands) from Emperor Ferdinand III. in Ebersdorf on September 15, 1644, through "Herr auf Pfannhoffen und Wißenau" and the merging of the coat of arms of with the now extinct Haßlinger zu Pfannhofen und Seepüh and the now also extinct von Pibriach zum Biberstein.

== Possessions ==
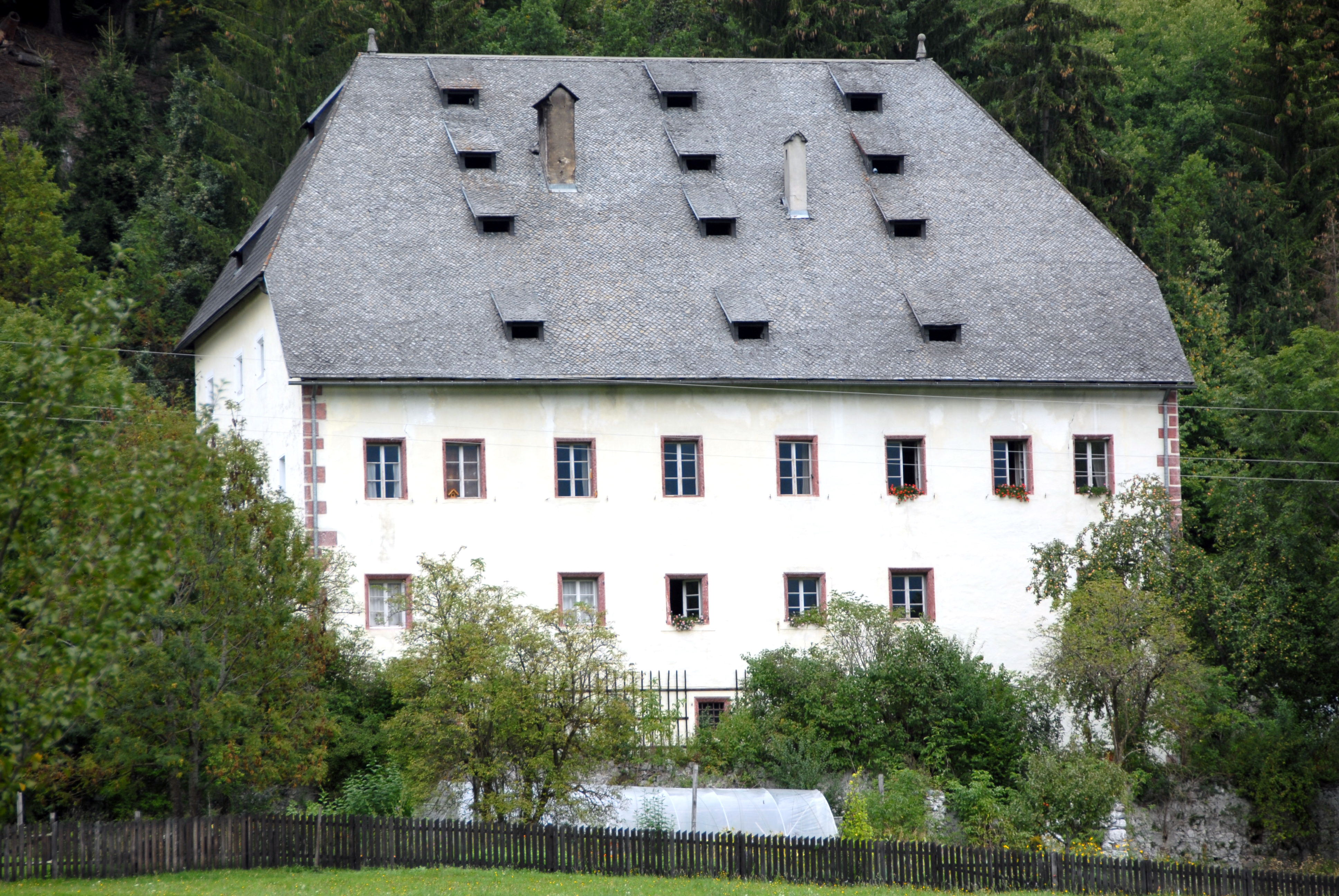
Remainders of Castle Manndorf in Carinthia (only the center estate remains)

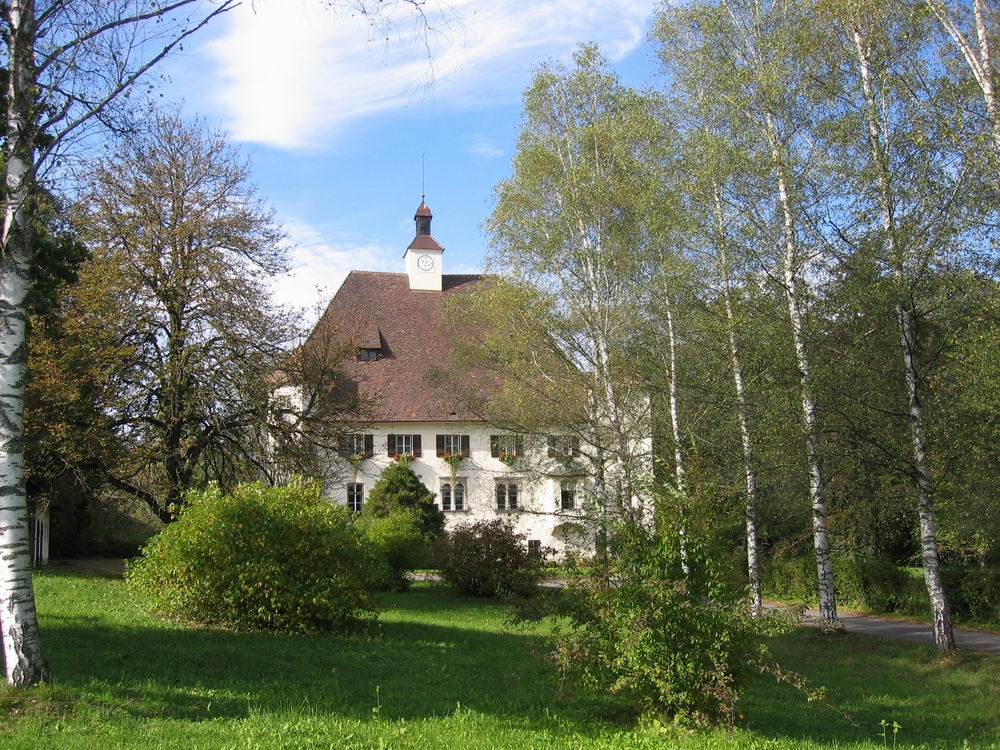
Estate Wiesenau

Over the centuries the Manndorffs acquired the following dominions, estates, and castles in Carinthia.

- Manndorf
- Pfannhofen
- Wiesenau
- Schüttbach
- Pittersberg
- Goldenstein
- Rothenthurn
- Flaschberg
- Wulross
- Biberstein
- Neudenstein
- Krastowitz
- Seebichl
- Vorderberg
- Dietrichstein
- Söbriach
- Görtschachhof
- Waldenstein
- Gurnitz
- Oberfalkenstein
- Winklern

More family possessions existed in eastern Tyrol, Carniola (modern Slovenia) and Hungary.

Hans Manndorff founded the monastery Maria Luggau in 1520 in the valley of Lesachtal. Around the year 1500 he remodeled the estate Edling at Kotschach in the upper Gail Valley in Carinthia to a castle which he called "Manndorf". Castle Manndorf is considered to be one of the first castles in Carinthia

== People ==
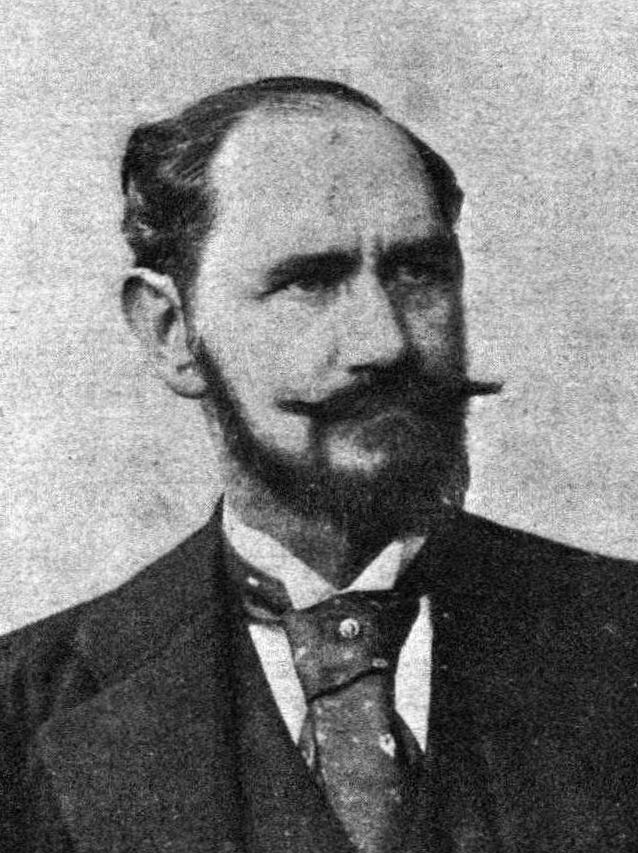
Knight Ferdinand of Mannlicher, inventor and weapons designer

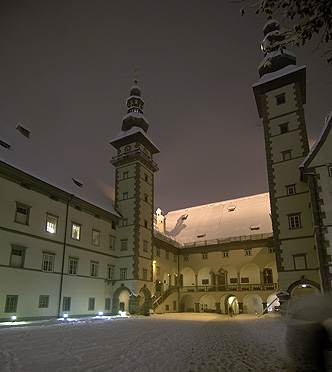
Parliament of Klagenfurt

- Hans Manndorff (1480–1530) was an imperial war paymaster in Vienna.
- Joachim (1507–1556), Caspar (1536–1618), Hans III (1571–1629) of Manndorff were general collection officers in Carinthia.

Many other Manndorffs became deputies to the Carinthian state parliament. The coat of arms of the family Manndorff is represented five times in the hall of coat of arms inside the "Landhaus" (palace of the estates) of Klagenfurt.

- Balthasar Manndorff (1574–1628) was a well known mercenary during the Thirty Years' War, Captain in the wars against Italy, and was stabbed to death in 1628 in a duel by a Mr. of Aschau.
- Johann Ferdinand Reichsfreiherr von und zu Manndorff (1644–1696) and his wife Anna, born Countess of Hohenwart, left Carinthia as Protestants around 1690 and settled in Hungary (the present Austrian region Burgenland), where they acquired the castles and estates Galoshaza, Nikitsch, and Pilgersdorf.
- Vincenz Reichsfreiherr von und zu Manndorff (1755–1820) was a district captain of Radom, Lublin, and Samocse in Galicia (present Poland).

Through the marriage of Anton Konrad (1797–1866) with Anna Maria Countess of Esterházy-Galantha a Transylvania -based Hungarian line of the family Manndorff was created, which became extinct with the death of Anton (1922–1978).

- Dr. Geza from this Hungarian line, Reichsfreiherr von und zu Manndorff (1860–1925) was a member of the Hungarian Parliament.
- Rudolph (1849–1918) became known as a political writer, his son Dr. Maximilian Reichsfreiherr von und zu Manndorff (1888–1970) was the teacher of Archduke Gottfried, was a district captain in Waidhofen/Thaya, and the lower Austrian Heimwehr (home guard) Commander, after the Austria-Hungary K.u.k. monarchy ended.

Through marriage of Dr. Maximilian Manndorff with Albertine von Mannlicher (1893–1957), all surviving bearers of the name Manndorff are also descendants of the inventor and arms designer Ferdinand, Knight of Mannlicher.

- Ferdinand Manndorff (born 1922) is a politician and was elected to the Landtag of lower Austria and the Austrian Parliament. His son Andy Manndorff (born 1957) is a well-known composer and Jazz guitarist.
- Hans Manndorff (born 1928), Brother of Ferdinand Manndorff, was the long-time Director of the museum of ethnology in Vienna

== Coat of arms ==
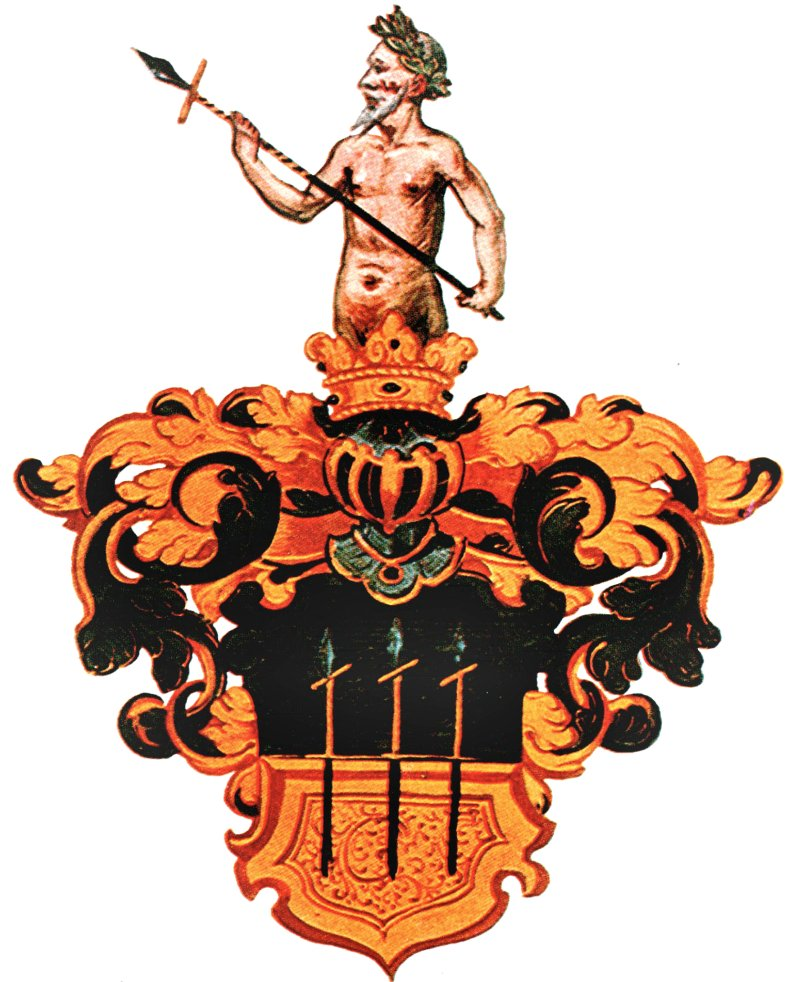

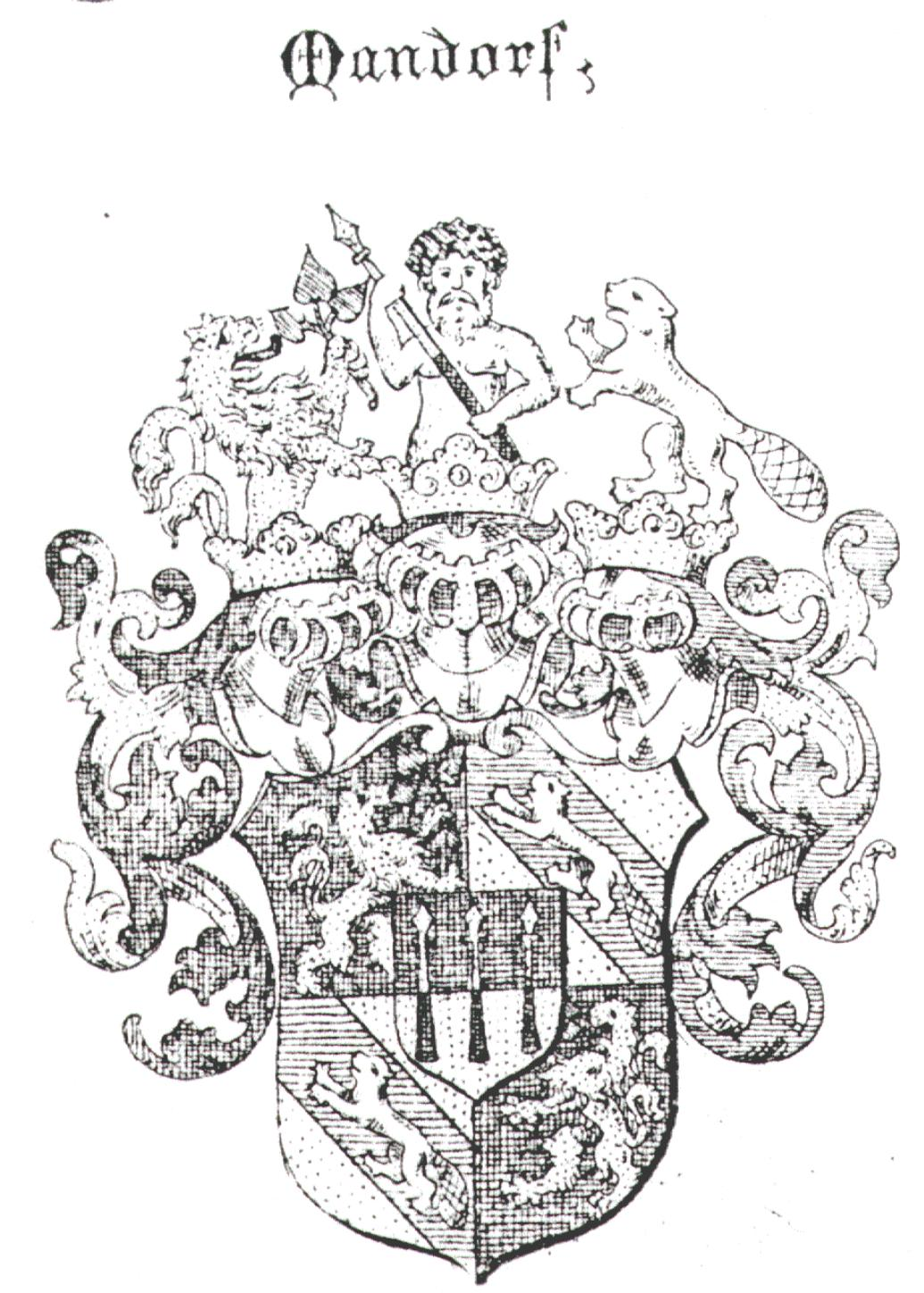
Another version of the modern coat of arms

- Coat of arms (original): Inside a shield split horizontally in black and gold are three spears (called Schweinsfeder — "swine’s feather" — a spear-like war weapon) next to each other with varying colors; on the helmet which has black-golden embellishments is an adorned wild man, holding a spear with both hands in an angle so that the right hand touches the spear's golden part, the left hand the black part. In the oldest seals the spears in the shield were instead bars, they were probably golden in black.
- Coat-of-arms (1644): Split in four with a fifth subdivision in the center. The center features the original coat of arms (as described above). The top left and bottom right feature an inwards facing, upright, two-tailed golden lion, holding a three-leafed green hazel branch (representing extinct Haßlinger line) on a black background; Top right and bottom left feature a blue diagonal bar with a beaver running up its length (representing extinct Pibriach line) on a golden background. On top of the shield are three helmets representing the three lines. On the right helmet, which has black-and-gold embellishments, the Haßlinger lion. On the middle helmet, which has green embellishments as in the original coat of arms, the wild man. On the left helmet, which has blue-and-gold embellishments, the Pibriach beaver.

== Family Tree ==
1. Achaz Mandorfer (died 1448) married Elisabeth Stainpekh
  1. Ulrich Maindorfer married I. Elisabeth Fleckh von Penck, married II. Ursula Anna Plazoller zu Plazoll
    1. (II.)Hans Mandorfer (1480–1530) married Anna Söll von Teisegg, military paymaster to the Kaiser
      1. Joachim Mandorfer (1507–1556) married Dorothea von Graben zum Stein, General collector in Carinthia
        1. Caspar Manndorfer zu Mandorf und Placzoll (1536–1618) married Helena von Pibriach zum Biberstein, General Collector in Carinthia
          1. Hans von und zu Manndorf (1571–1629) married Margarethe Hasslinger zu Pfannhofen und Seepühl, General Collector in Carinthia
            1. Freiherr Siegmund Friedrich von Manndorff, Lord of Pfannhofen and Wissenau (1613–1683) married Katharina Barbara von Attems-Petzenstein
              1. Freiherr Georg Siegmund von Manndorff (1638–1700) married Countess Anastasia to Spaur and Flavon
                1. Freiherr Georg Mathias von Manndorff (1678–1758) married I. Freiin Maria Magdalena von Gaisruck; verh. II. Maria Theresia Kemetter Freiin zu Trübein
                  1. Freiin Maria Anna Katharina Josepha Nepomucena von Manndorff (born 1722)
                  2. Freiherr Niklas Ehrenreich von Manndorff (born 1725) verh. Maria Theresia Menkhover von Menkhoven (1717–1794)
                    1. Freiherr Franz von Manndorff (1754–1797)
                    2. Freiherr Vinzenz von Manndorff (1755–1820) verh. I. Baroness Maria Philippine Vanczura z Rzehnicz married II. Karoline Vanczura z Rzehnicz Kreishauptmann von Radom, Liblin and Samocse in Galizien in modern-day Poland
                      1. (I.) Freiin Friederike von Manndorff (born 1864)
                      2. (II.) Freiherr Anton von Manndorff von Pfannhofen und Wiesenau (1797–1866) verh. Gräfin Anna Mária Esterházy de Galántha
                        1. Freiin Josefine von Manndorff (1833–1890)
                        2. Freiherr Karl von Manndorff (1834–1866)
                          1. Freiherr Geza von Manndorff (1860–1925) verh. Gizella Korbuly, Dr. jur., Gutsbesitzer in Velencze, k.u.k. Lt. d. Res., Abg. d. ungar. Reichstags
                            1. Freiherr Bela von Manndorff (1892–1971) verh. I. Ella Meszleny v. Meszlen verh. II Alexa Halasz v. Dabas, Dipl. Ing., Rittm. d. Res.
                              1. Freiin Eva Anna Maria von Manndorff (1920–2004)
                              2. Freiherr Anton von Manndorff (1922–1978) verh. I Alexa Herresbacher verh. II Marianne Rousso
                                1. Freiherr Nikolaus Bela von Manndorff (1948–1970)
                              3. Freiin Elisabeth von Manndorff (1926–2010), Ordensfrau im Sacre Coeur in Bregenz, Riedenburg
                            2. Freiin Anna Maria von Manndorff (1893–1968)
                      3. (II.) Freiherr Adolf von Manndorff, Herr auf Pfannhofen und Wissenau (1802–1876) verh. I. Freiin Eleonore Helversen von Helversheim verh. II. Luise Kager Freiin von Stampach verh. III. Johanna Schild
                        1. (I.) Freiin Maria von Manndorff (1841–1848)
                        2. (I.) Freiin Caroline von Manndorff (1842–1852)
                        3. (I.) Freiin Melanie von Manndorff (1843–1857)
                        4. (I.) Freiin Ottilie von Manndorff (1844–1870)
                        5. (I.) Freiherr Rudolf von Manndorff (1849–1918) verh. Sophia Fiedler, politischer Schriftsteller
                          1. Freiin Miriam von Manndorff (1880–1934)
                          2. Freiherr Rudolf von Manndorff (1882–1912)
                          3. Freiin Gabriele von Manndorff (1883–1940)
                          4. Freiherr Franz Xaver von Manndorff (1885–1941) verh. Anna Kropfitsch
                            1. Freiin Guida von Manndorff (1912–2004)
                            2. Freiherr Rudolf von Manndorff (1914–1941)
                          5. Freiherr Udo von Manndorff (1886–1901)
                          6. Freiin Sophie von Manndorff (1887–1949)
                          7. Freiherr Maximilian von Manndorff (1888–1970) verh. Albertine von Mannlicher, Dr. jur., Erzieher des Erzherzogs Gottfried, Bezirkshauptmann in Waidhofen/Thaya und Kommandant der Niederösterreichischen Heimwehr.
                            1. Ferdinand Manndorff (1922–2013) verh. I. Hildegard Petrasch verh. II. Dorothea Feldhahn, Politiker und Abgeordneter zum Niederösterreichischen Landtag und zum Österreichischen Nationalrat
                              1. (I.)Hartmann Rudolf Maria Manndorff (born 1951) verh. Patricia Danninger
                                1. Maximilian Friedrich Maria Manndorff (born 1989) verh. Xhoj Hysenaj
                                2. Isabella Katharina Maria Manndorff (born 1991)
                                3. Sophia Anna Maria Manndorff (born 1993)
                              2. (II.)Andy Manndorff (born 1957), Komponist und Jazzgittarist, verh. Andrea Schneider
                            2. Harti Manndorff (1924–1944), Fliegerleutnant
                            3. Lore Manndorff (1926–1992)
                            4. Hans Manndorff (born 1928) verh. I. Gertrude Graf verh. II. Elisabeth Bauer, Dr.phil., Univ. Prof., Direktor des Museums für Völkerkunde in Wien.
                              1. (I.) Wolfgang Manndorff (born 1960)
                              2. (I.) Rudolf Manndorff (born 1963) verh. Anette Schneider, Pilot
                                1. Julian Manndorff (born 1999)
                              3. (II.) Hemma Manndorff (born 1984)
                            5. Maria Manndoff (born 1934) verh. I. DI Nikolaus Rohla verh. II. Dr. Herbert Melichar verh. III. Mag. pharm. Wolfgang Lorenzoni
                            6. Franzi Manndorff (born 1936) verh. I. Elisabeth Daublebsky von Eichhain verh. II. Irene Umgeher, Dr. jur., Vorstandsdirektor einer Versicherungsgesellschaft, Major der Res.
                              1. Georg Manndorff (born 1969), Mag. rer.soc.oec.
                              2. Hannes Manndorff (born 1970), Dr. phil.
                          8. Freiherr Johann von Manndorff (1890–1891)
                          9. Freiin Helene von Manndorff (1892–1969)
                          10. Freiin Mathilde von Manndorff (1893–1970)
                          11. Freiherr Johann von Manndorff (1894–1895)
                        6. (I.) Freiin Maria von Manndorff (1850–1850)
                        7. (II.) Freiin Philomena von Manndorff (1872–1948)
                        8. (II.) Freiherr Robert von Manndorff (1874–1937)
                      4. Freiin Nepomucena von Manndorff

== Literature ==
- Gothaisches Genealogisches Taschenbuch der Freiherrlichen Häuser (GGT F). 1870 bis 1941
- Genealogisches Handbuch des Adels, Freiherrliche Häuser XXIII. 2005, Ältere Genealogie
- Friedrich Graf Lanjus: Mandorff-Regesten. In: Monatsblatt der Gesellschaft „ADLER“. 1934
- Siebmachers Wappenbuch, Band 29, „Der Adel in Kärnten, Krain und Dalmatien“. Neustadt an der Aisch 1980
- A. Weiß: Der Adel Kärntens bis zum Jahre 1300. Wien 1869
- Paul Dedic: Kärntner Exulanten des 17. Jahrhundert. In: Carinthia I. 1952
- Georg Siegmund Freiherr von Manndorff: Mandorfferischer „Stamen-Paumb“. Rothenthurn 1688
- Vinzenz Freiherr von Manndorff: Ergänzungen dazu, Wien 1815
- Gustav Adolf von Metnitz: Geadelte Bürger in Kärnten. In: Carinthia. 1964
- H. Wiessner, M. Vyoral-Tschapka: Burgen und Schlösser in Kärnten. Bezirk Hermagor, Spittal/Drau, Villach, Wien 1986
- Thomas Tiefenbacher: Helena - eine geschichtliche Erzählung. Klagenfurt 1958.
- detaillierte Ahnentafeln auf
