= Václav Marek =

Václav Marek may refer to:

- Václav Marek (footballer) (born 1981), Czech football goalkeeper
- Václav Marek (writer) (1908–1994), Czech writer, traveller, publicist and researcher of Saami languages
