= Jenny Schermaul =

Bohemian botanical illustrator

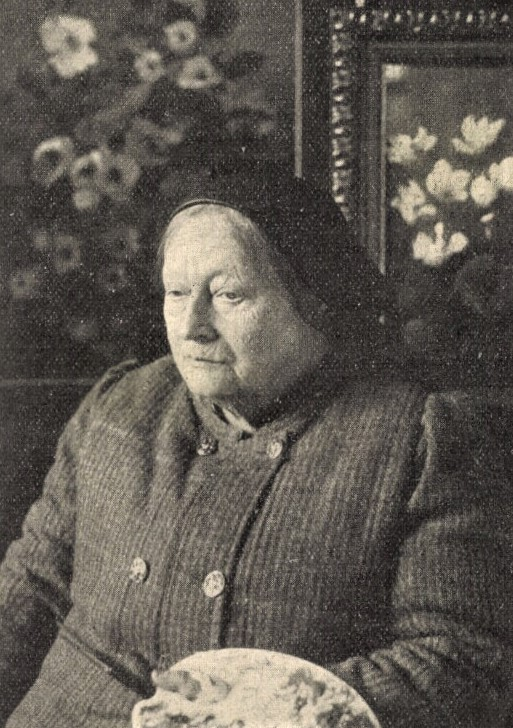
- Born: May 24, 1828; Liblín
- Died: October 30, 1909; New Town
- Resting place: Olšany Cemetery
- Occupations: Painter, illustrator

Jenny Schermaul (May 24, 1828 – October 30, 1909) was a Bohemian flower painter and botanical illustrator.

Jenny Schermaul was born on May 24, 1828 in Liblín. She exhibited her works at the 1873 Vienna World's Fair and the 1880 exhibition of the Prussian Academy of Arts in Berlin. She was a prolific botanical illustrator. She and Joseph Seboth illustrated Aglaia Elisabeth von Enderes' and Moritz Willkomm's Frühlingsblumen ("Spring Flowers", 8 vols., 1882-84), Carus Sterne's Frühlings-, Sommer-, Herbst- und Winterblumen ("Spring, Summer, Autumn and Winter Flowers," 1883-86), and Ferdinand Graf's Die Alpenpflanzen nach der Natur gemalt ("Alpine Plants Painted from Nature", 4 vols., 1880-1886). She was the sole illustrator for Sterne's Sommerblumen. Eine Schilderung der niederen Blumenwelt ("Summer Flowers. A Description of the Native Floral World," 1884), producing 124 engravings and 40 color lithographs.

Jenny Schermaul died on 30 October 1909 in New Town.

== Gallery ==
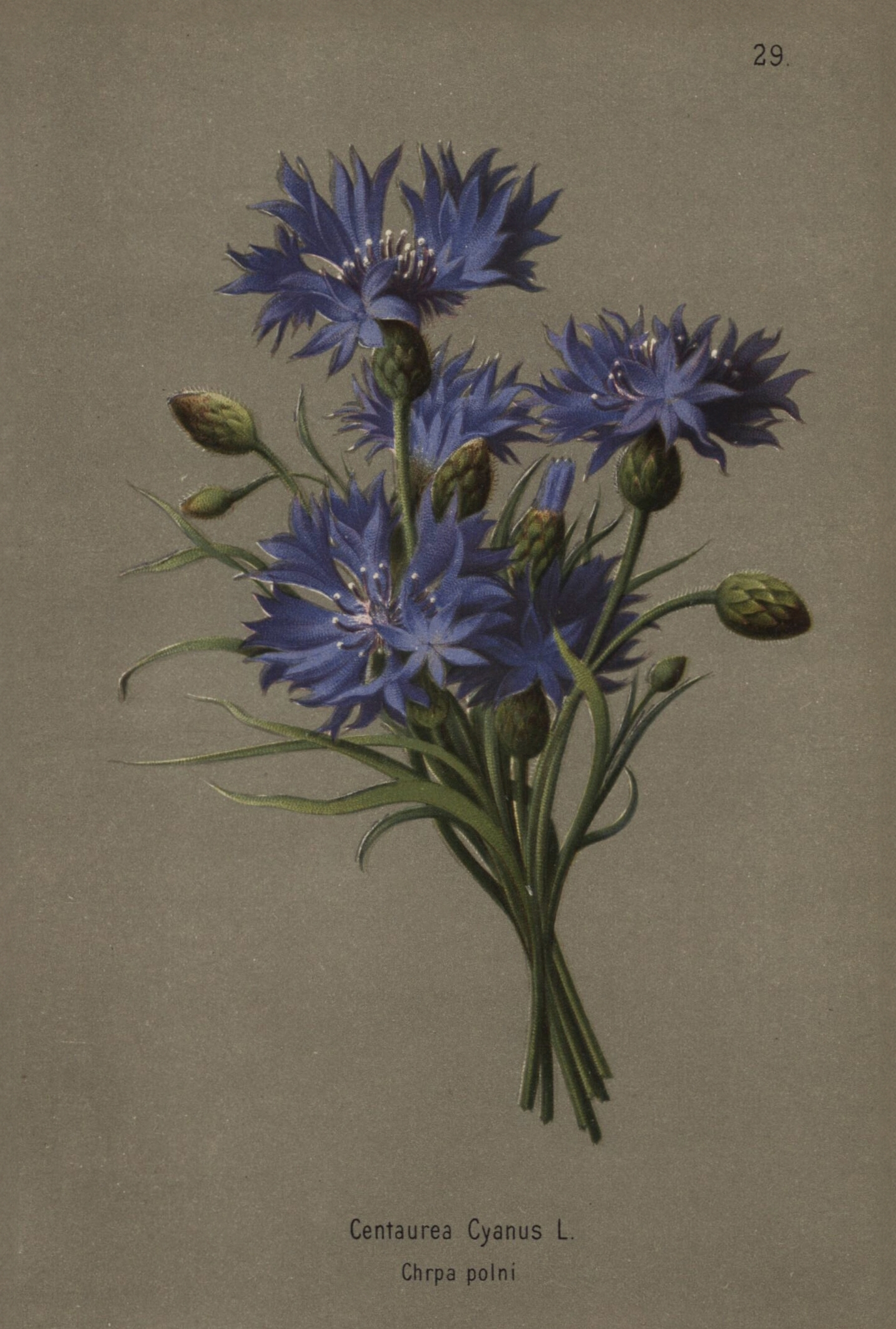
Centaurea cyanus L. (1888)

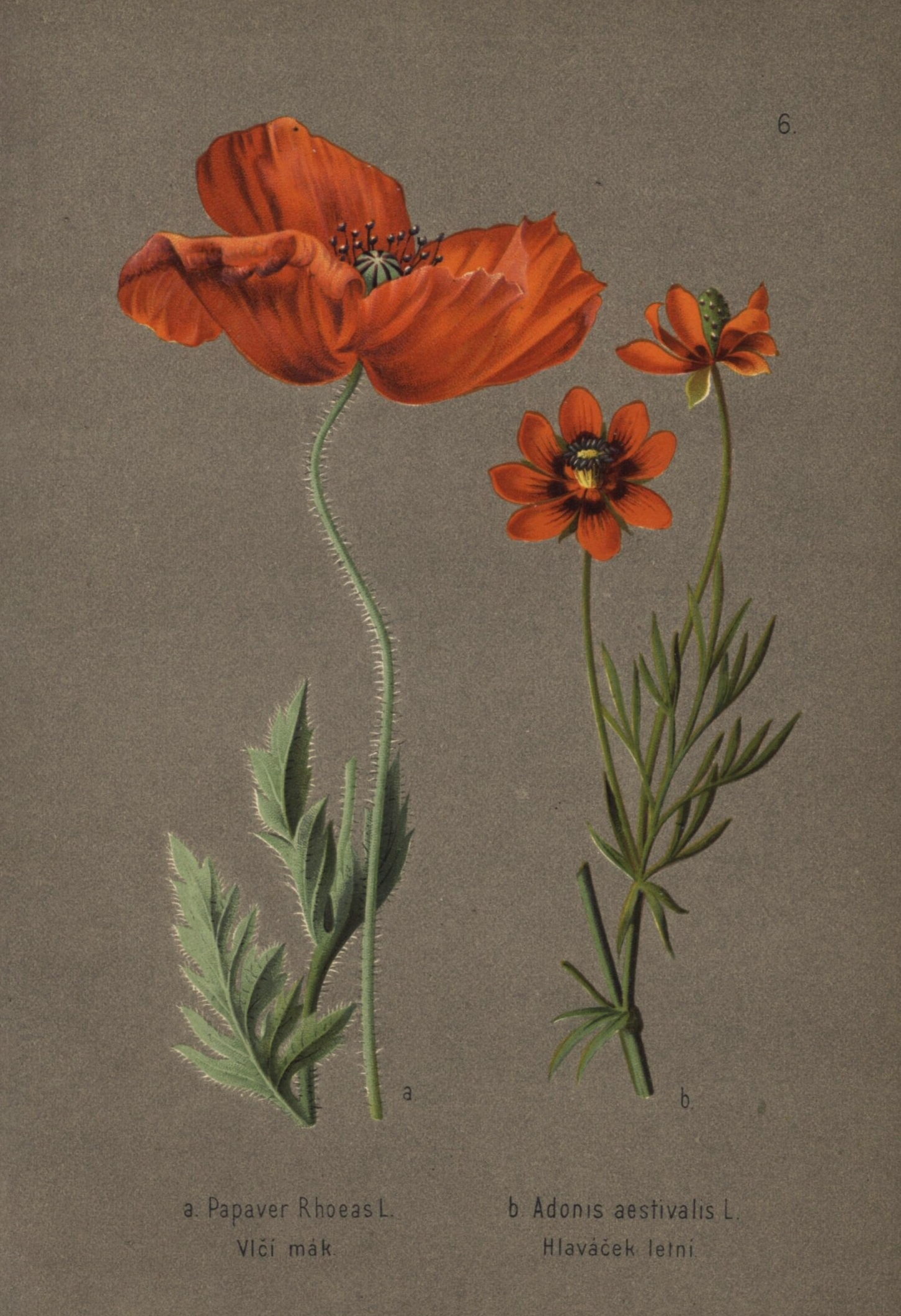
Papaver Rhoeas L. and Adonis aestivalis L. (1888)

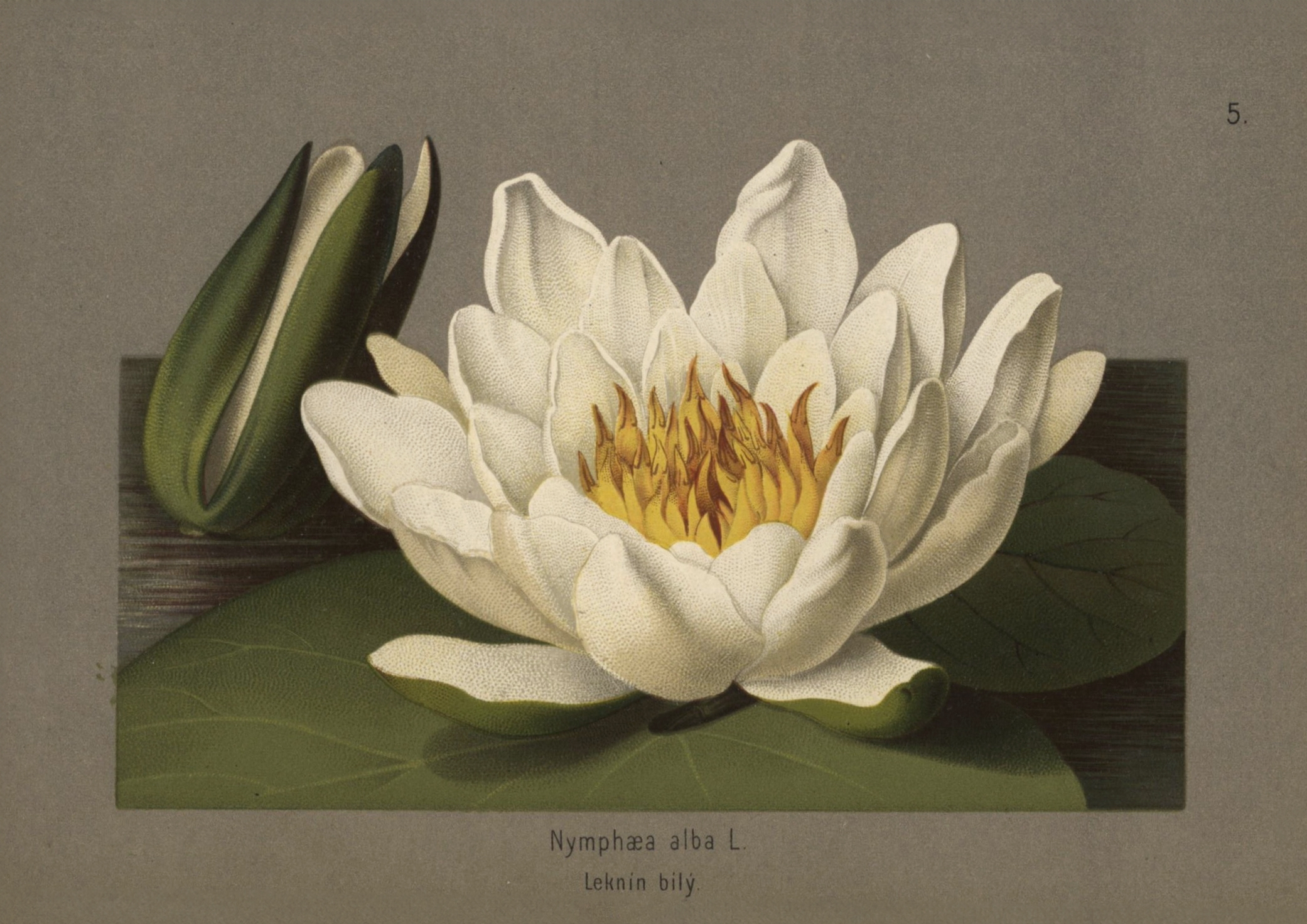
Nymphaea alba L. (1888)
