= Jan Marek =

Jan Marek may refer to:

- Jan Marek (ice hockey, born 1947), ice hockey goaltender who played with the DEG Metro Stars (Germany)
- Jan Marek (ice hockey, born 1979), Czech ice hockey player who died in the 2011 Lokomotiv Yaroslavl air disaster

== See also ==
- Jan Marek Marci, Bohemian doctor and scientist
