= Ellen Cushing =

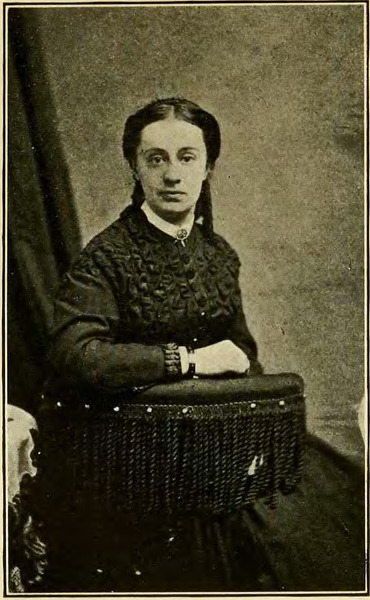
- Born: August 29, 1840; Kingston
- Died: April 30, 1915 (aged 74); Providence
- Occupation: Missionary
- Spouse(s): Josiah Nelson Cushing

Ellen Howard Winsor Fairfield Cushing (August 29, 1840 – April 30, 1915) was an American missionary in Myanmar.

She was born on August 29, 1840 in Kingston, Massachusetts. She worked as a schoolteacher in Boston in 1861, but the next year she left her job to volunteer for the Port Royal Experiment, where newly freed slaves worked on abandoned land. Winsor supervised workers on St. Helena Island and Lady's Island. On the former island, she caught and survived a case of yellow fever. In 1863, she married Josiah Fairfield, the superintendent of plantations. She was widowed in 1865 when he went down with the steamer SS Melville off Cape Hatteras.

She returned to Boston to become matron of The Home for Little Wanderers. In August 1866, she married Josiah Nelson Cushing, a seminary student at Newton Theological Institute. The couple travelled to work as missionaries in northeast Burma (present day Myanmar), arriving in Rangoon in 1867. They ministered to Shan people at stations at Toungoo and Bhamo and created Shan language translations of the Gospels and an English-Shan dictionary.

In 1886 Cushing became a field secretary with the Philadelphia Baptist Missionary Union while her husband continued missionary work. In 1892, she helped found the Baptist Training School for Christian Workers, which was named Ellen Cushing Junior College until its closing in 1980.

After her husband died in 1905, she returned to Burma for several years to complete his translations.

Cushing died on 30 April 1915 in Providence, Rhode Island.
