= Sadská =

- Town
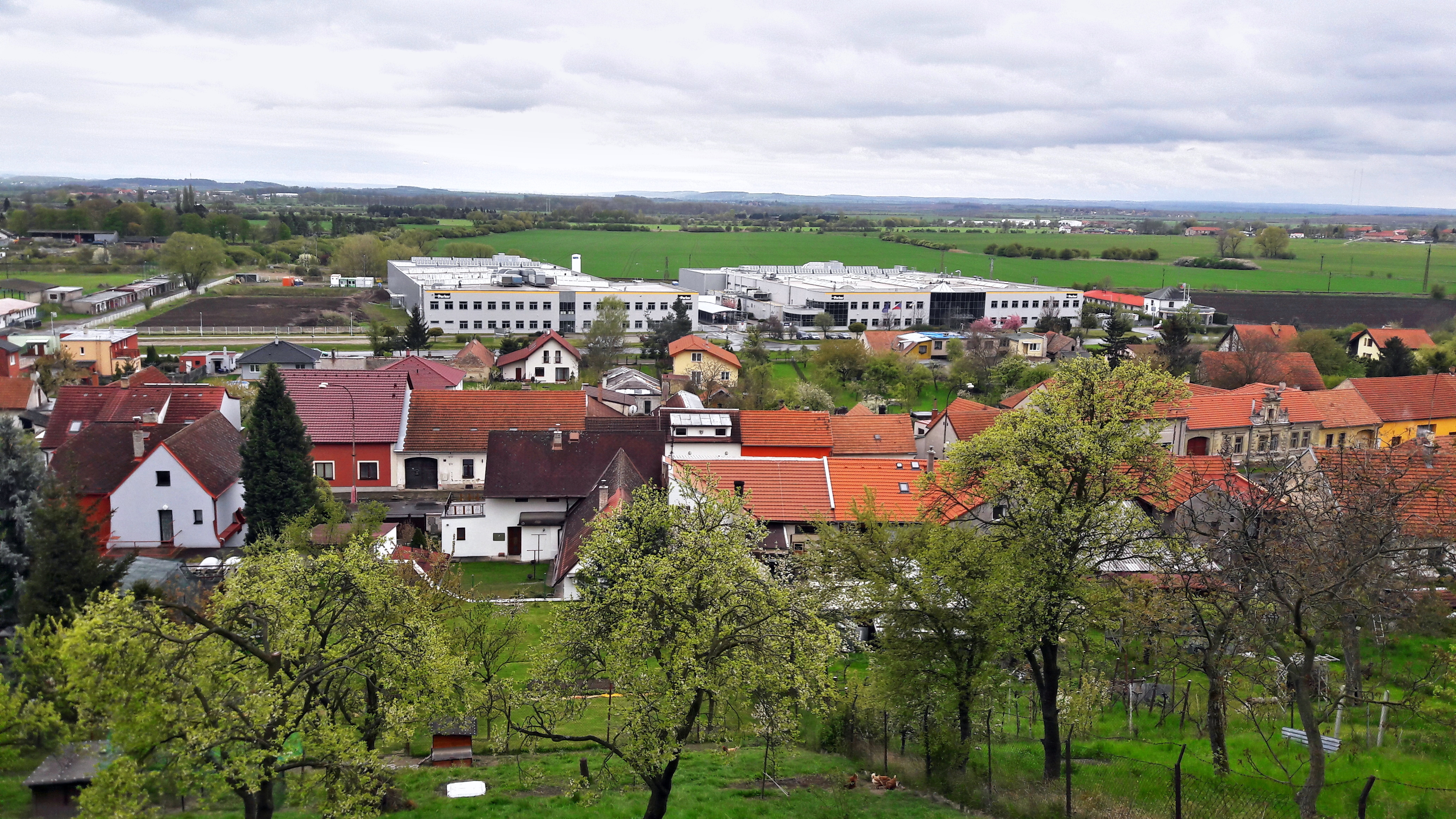
- Southern part of Sadská

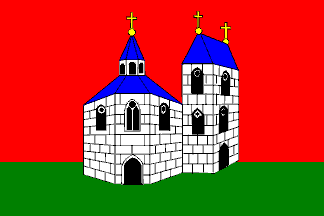
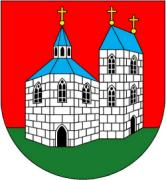
- Flag Coat of arms

- Location in the Czech Republic
- Coordinates: 50°8′21″N 14°58′56″E
- Country: Czech Republic
- Region: Central Bohemian
- District: Nymburk
- First mentioned: 993

Government
  - Mayor: Milan Dokoupil

Area
  - Total: 16.44 km^{2} (6.35 sq mi)
- Elevation: 185 m (607 ft)

Population (2026-01-01)
  - Total: 3,308
  - Density: 201.2/km^{2} (521.1/sq mi)
- Time zone: UTC+1 (CET)
  - Summer (DST): UTC+2 (CEST)
- Postal code: 289 12
- Website: www.mesto-sadska.cz

Sadská (Czech pronunciation: [ˈsat.skaː]) is a town in Nymburk District in the Central Bohemian Region of the Czech Republic. It has about 3,300 inhabitants. The town is located in the Central Elbe Table, near the Elbe River. Sadská existed as early as the 10th century and is therefore among the oldest Czech towns.

== Etymology ==
The name of the settlement in the oldest documents fluctuated between different forms and the origin of the name is unclear. There is a theory that the name was derived from the personal name Saky or from the word saky (literally 'bags', but figuratively it could mean 'fat people').

== Geography ==
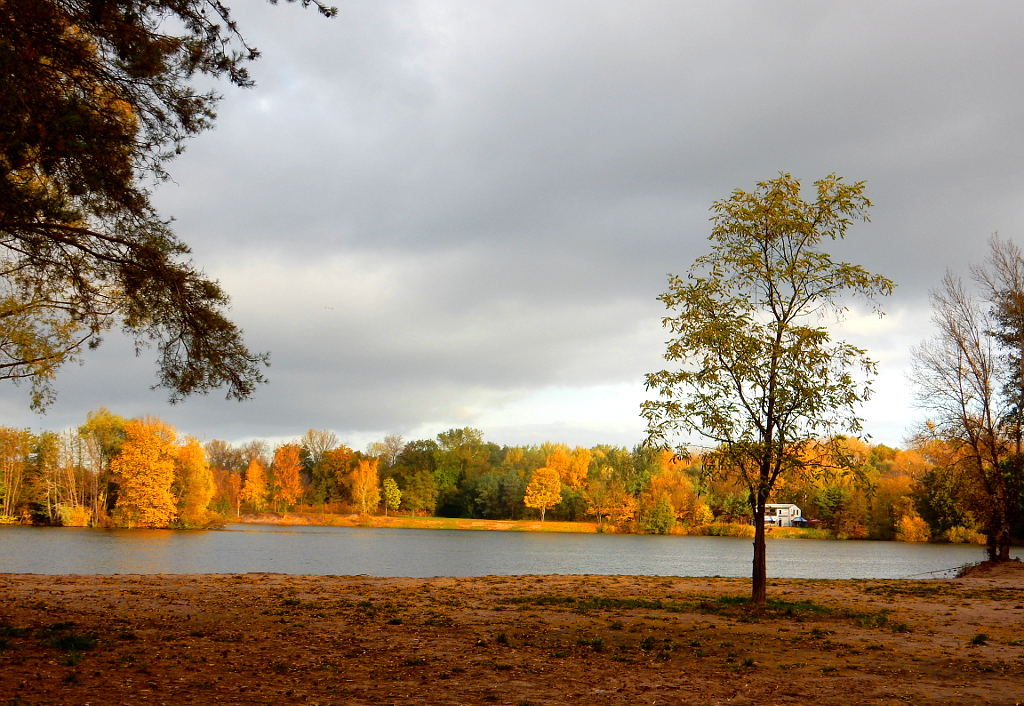
Sadská Lake

Sadská is located about 6 kilometres (4 mi) southwest of Nymburk and 30 km (19 mi) east of Prague. It lies in the Central Elbe Table lowland within the Polabí region. The highest point is a hill in the centre of the town at 215 m (705 ft) above sea level. The Šembera River flows southeast of the town, and the Elbe forms short part of the northern municipal border. In the northern part of the territory is Sadská Lake, which was created by flooding a sand quarry.

== History ==
The first written mention of Sadská is in the foundation document of the Břevnov Monastery from 993. A royal castle was built on a hill above the town to protect the country road. In 1118–1120, Duke Bořivoj II had built the Church of Saint Apollinaris with a chapter. Until the mid-13th century, monarchs used to go to Sadská for entertainment and hunting. In 1262, the seat was moved to Poděbrady, only the chapter remained. A hundred years later, Charles IV transferred the chapter to New Town of Prague, and the golden times of Sadská came to an end.

A convent was founded here, but it was burned down during the Hussite Wars. A new prosperity began in 1562, when Sadská was promoted to a market town by Emperor Ferdinand I. During the 17th century, the castle disappeared as a result of the Thirty Years' War and several large fires. In 1784, Sadská was promoted to a town by Emperor Joseph II.

== Demographics ==
Historical population

Year	Pop.	±%
1869	3,121	—
1880	3,244	+3.9%
1890	3,125	−3.7%
1900	3,150	+0.8%
1910	3,096	−1.7%

Year	Pop.	±%
1921	3,057	−1.3%
1930	3,238	+5.9%
1950	3,099	−4.3%
1961	3,011	−2.8%
1970	2,904	−3.6%

Year	Pop.	±%
1980	3,058	+5.3%
1991	3,104	+1.5%
2001	3,059	−1.4%
2011	3,260	+6.6%
2021	3,271	+0.3%

Source: Censuses

== Transport ==
The D11 motorway runs south of the town.

Sadská is located on the short railway line Nymburk–Poříčany.

== Sights ==
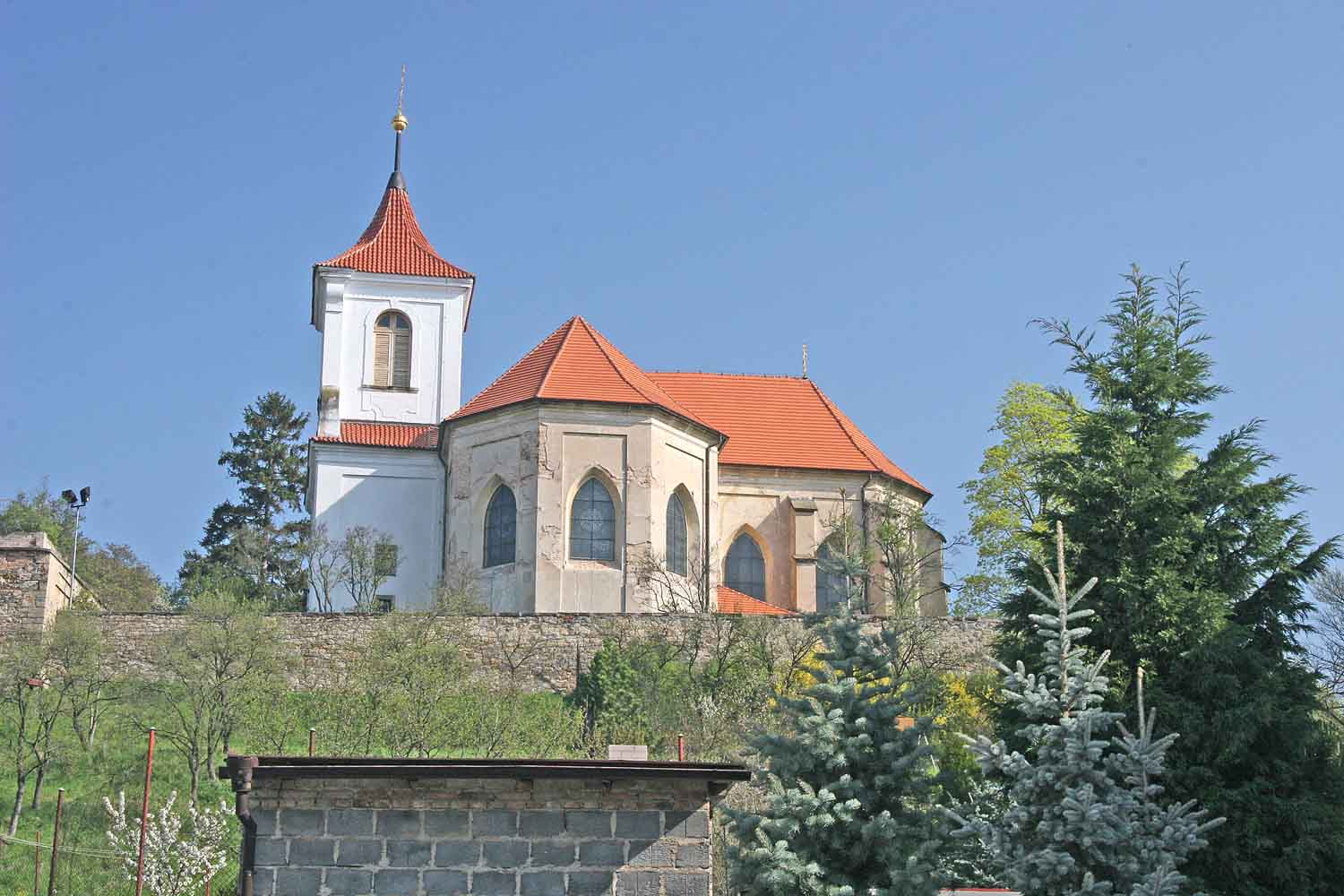
Church of Saint Appolinaris

The main landmark of the town is the Church of Saint Appolinaris, located on a hill above the town. It was rebuilt to its current form by Kilian Ignaz Dientzenhofer in 1737–1739, and modified in 1894–1895.

The Chapel of Our Lady of Sorrows was built next to a spring of healing water in 1714–1721, and probably was also rebuilt by Dientzenhofer.

The Baroque bell tower in Sadská dates from 1691. Originally it was a clock tower.

== Notable people ==
- Franz Xaver Niemetschek (1766–1849), philosopher and music critic
- Václav Marek (1908–1994), writer, traveller, publicist and researcher
