= Charles Pergler =

American lawyer

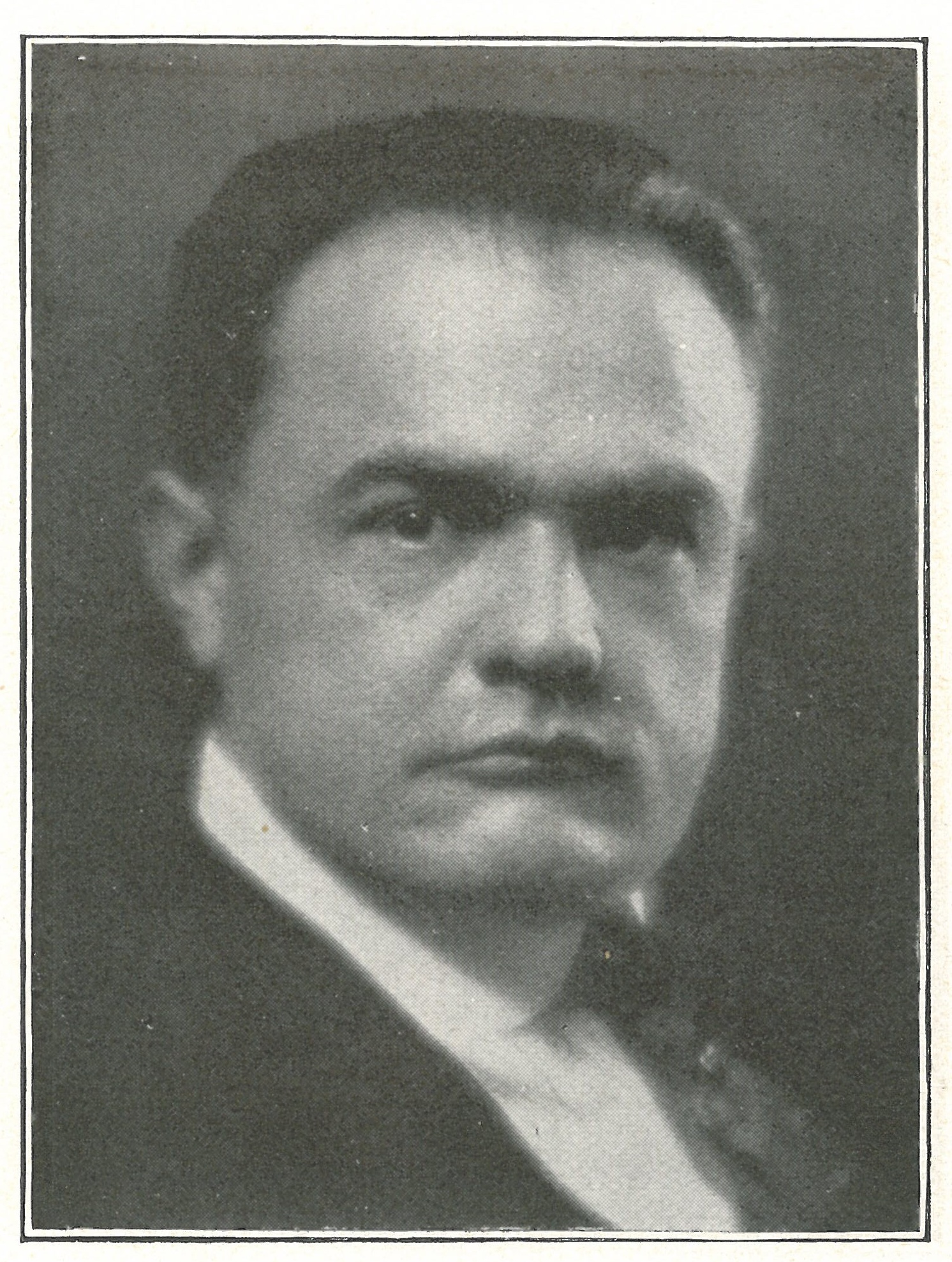
- Charles Pergler around 1920
- Born: Karel Pergler; March 6, 1882
- Died: August 14, 1954 (aged 72)
- Citizenship: United States
- Occupations: lawyer, journalist, diplomat, politician

Karel Pergler, known also by Anglicized Charles Pergler (Liblín, March 6, 1882 – Washington, D.C., August 14, 1954) was a Czech-American lawyer, journalist, diplomat and politician. He was a Czechoslovak First Republic ambassador to the United States and Japan.

Pergler was born in Liblín, Bohemia, but moved to the United States at a young age. When his father died, the family moved back to Bohemia, where Pergler got active in the socialist and nationalist movements supporting Czechoslovak independence from Austria-Hungary. He went back to the United States in 1903, studying law at Kent State, and afterwards practicing law in Iowa till 1917.

He served as the secretary of Professor Thomas Garrigue Masaryk from May 1918 in America.

He became ambassador to the United States after Czechoslovak independence in 1918, then becoming ambassador to Japan in 1920. He was dismissed from the foreign service in 1921, with his pension taken away, because of fraud at the Tokyo embassy. He returned to the United States, obtaining a Master of Laws degree from American University. He would return to Czechoslovakia in 1929, where he worked together with Radola Gajda and Jiří Stříbrný against Edvard Beneš, and got elected to parliament. In February 1931 he had to relinquish his post, because issues were raised over his citizenship. He returned to America, and taught at various universities. He died in Washington, D.C., in 1954.
