= Burgruine Flaschberg =

Castle ruins in Austria

Coordinates: 46.7495°N 12.9387°E

- Carinthia, Austria
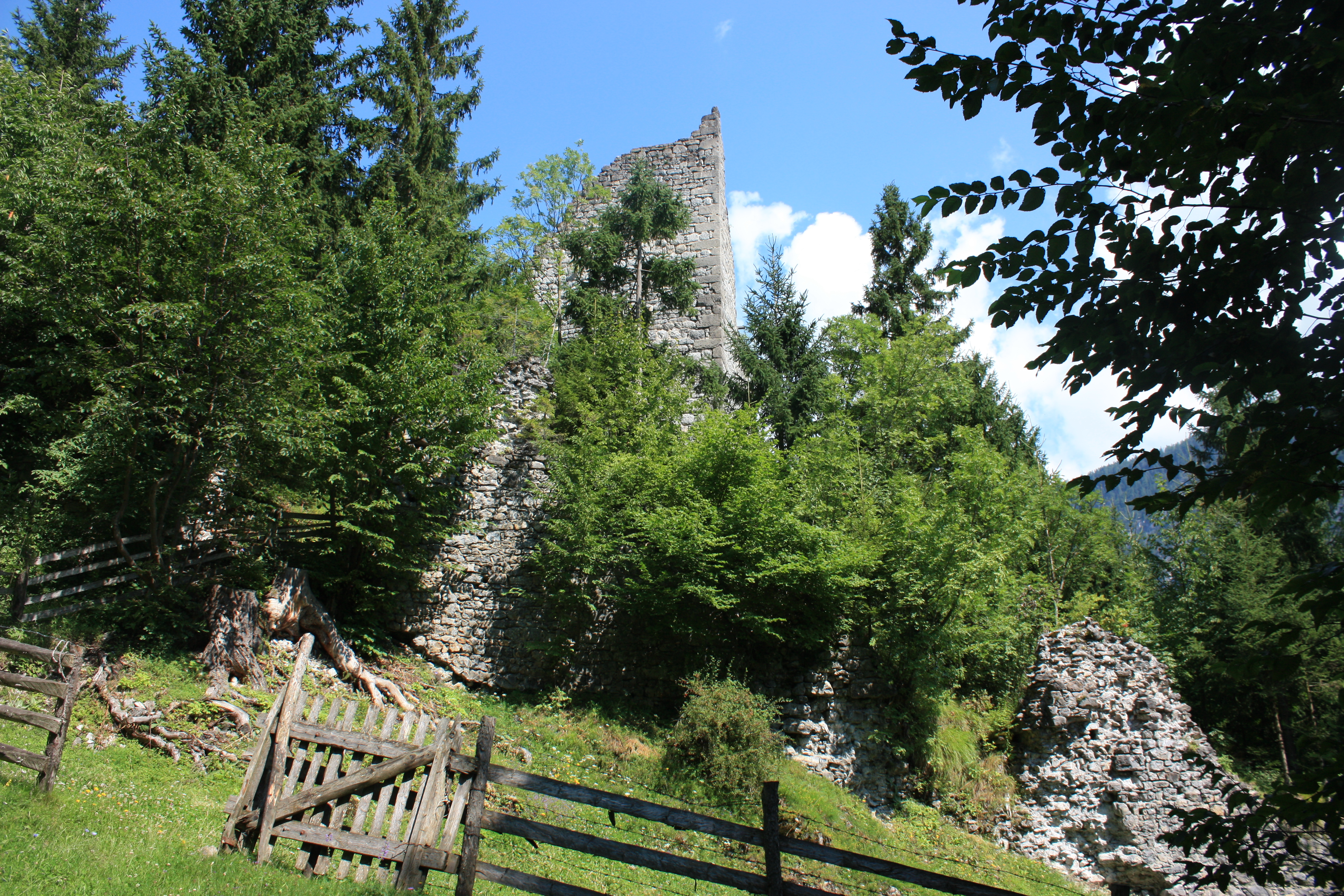

Site information
- Type: Hilltop castle

Site history
- Built: first mention 1154

Burgruine Flaschberg is a castle in Carinthia, Austria.

== See also ==
- List of castles in Austria
