= John Cushing (actor) =

British stage actor (1719–1790)

John Cushing (1719-1790) was a British stage actor.

He appeared at a variety of London fairs during the early 1740s, before joining the company at Goodman's Fields Theatre in 1744 along with his wife. He then spent many years as part of the company at the Covent Garden Theatre. His final appearance there came in 1782 and died in Liverpool in 1790.

== Bibliography ==
- Highfill, Philip H, Burnim, Kalman A. & Langhans, Edward A. A Biographical Dictionary of Actors, Actresses, Musicians, Dancers, Managers, and Other Stage Personnel in London, 1660-1800: Volume 4. SIU Press, 1975.
