= Jan Jindřich Marek =

Czech priest and poet

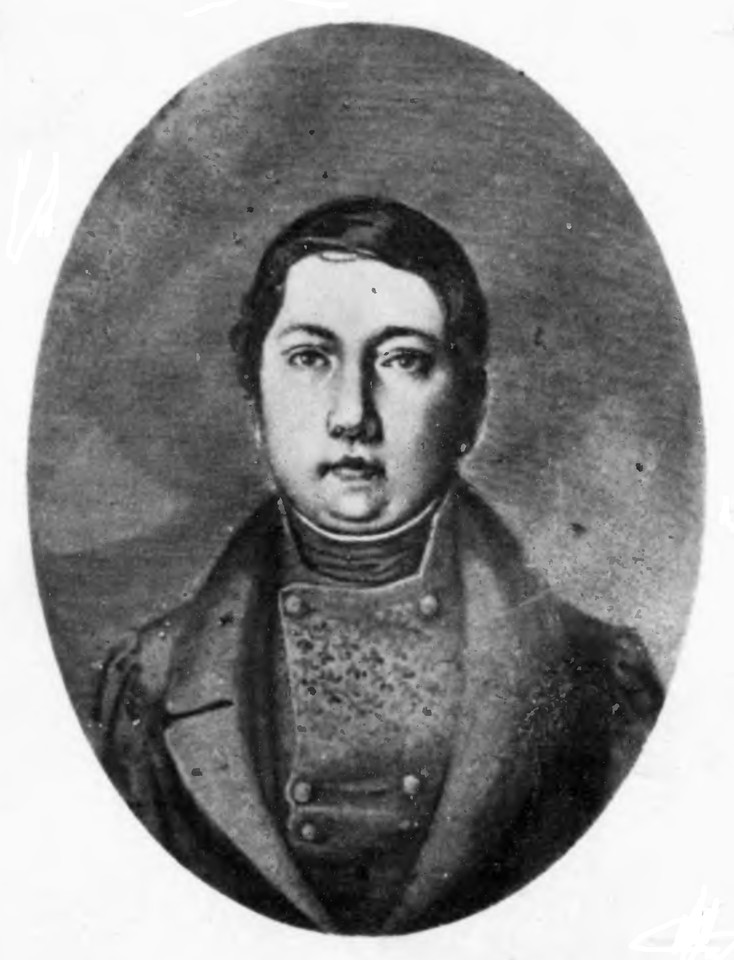
Marek in his youth

Jan Jindřich Marek (4 November 1803, Liblín – 3 November 1853, Kralovice), known also by his nom de plume Jan z Hvězdy, was a Czech priest and poet. He provided the text for Smetana's cantata for mixed chorus and orchestra Česká píseň (Czech Song) 1878.
