= Luther Cushing =

American jurist (1803–1856)

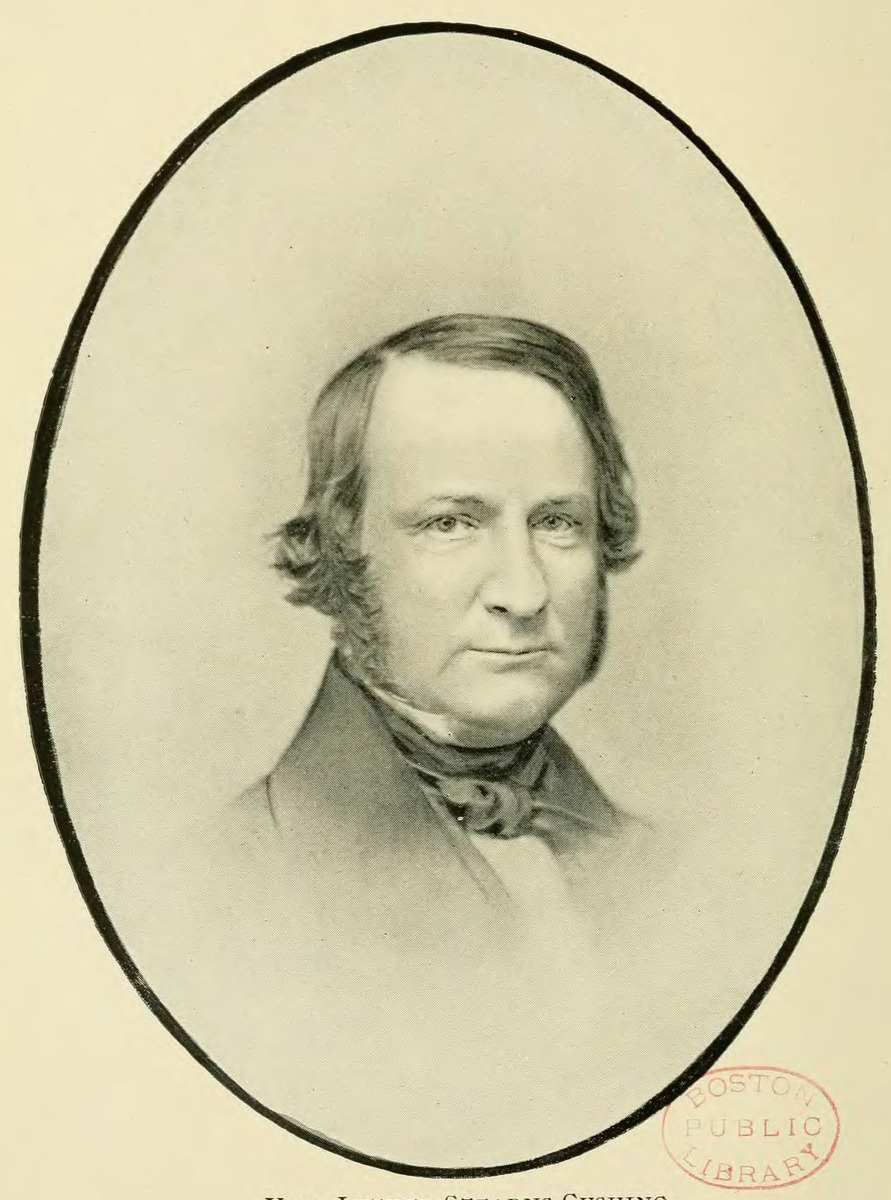
- Born: 1803
- Died: 1856 (aged 52–53)
- Occupation: Writer, jurist

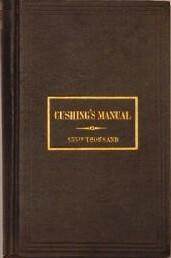
Cushing's Manual, 1876 printing

Luther Stearns Cushing (June 22, 1803 – June 22, 1856) was an American jurist. He was born on June 22, 1803, in Lunenburg, Massachusetts, and died on June 22, 1856, in Boston.

Cushing wrote one of the earliest works on parliamentary procedure, Rules of Proceeding and Debate in Deliberative Assemblies, commonly known as Cushing's Manual. The first edition was published in 1845. It was frequently revised by Cushing. Afterwards, others continued to revise the manual periodically.

He earned his law degree from Harvard Law School, the only member of the 1826 class.

== Notable later editions ==
- Allison, William L. Cushing's Manual of Parliamentary Practice (1886)
- Sullivan, Frances P. Cushing's Manual of Parliamentary Practice (1887, 1905)
- Baker, James Freeman. Cushing's Manual of Parliamentary Practice (1890)
- Ingalls, John James, Cushing's Manual of Parliamentary Practice (1895)
- Bolles, Albert S. Cushing's Manual of Parliamentary Practice (1901, with printings thru 1935)
- Bolles, Albert S. Cushing's Manual of Parliamentary Practice with Rules of Procedure in Business Corporations (1901, 1914)
- Gaines, Charles Kelsey, The New Cushing's Manual of Parliamentary Practice (1912)
- Lowe, Paul E. Cushing's Manual of Parliamentary Practice (1925)
- Cushing, Luther S. Modern Rules of Order (1964)
