= Baptist Institute for Christian Workers =

Historic building in Pennsylvania, United States

- U.S. National Register of Historic Places
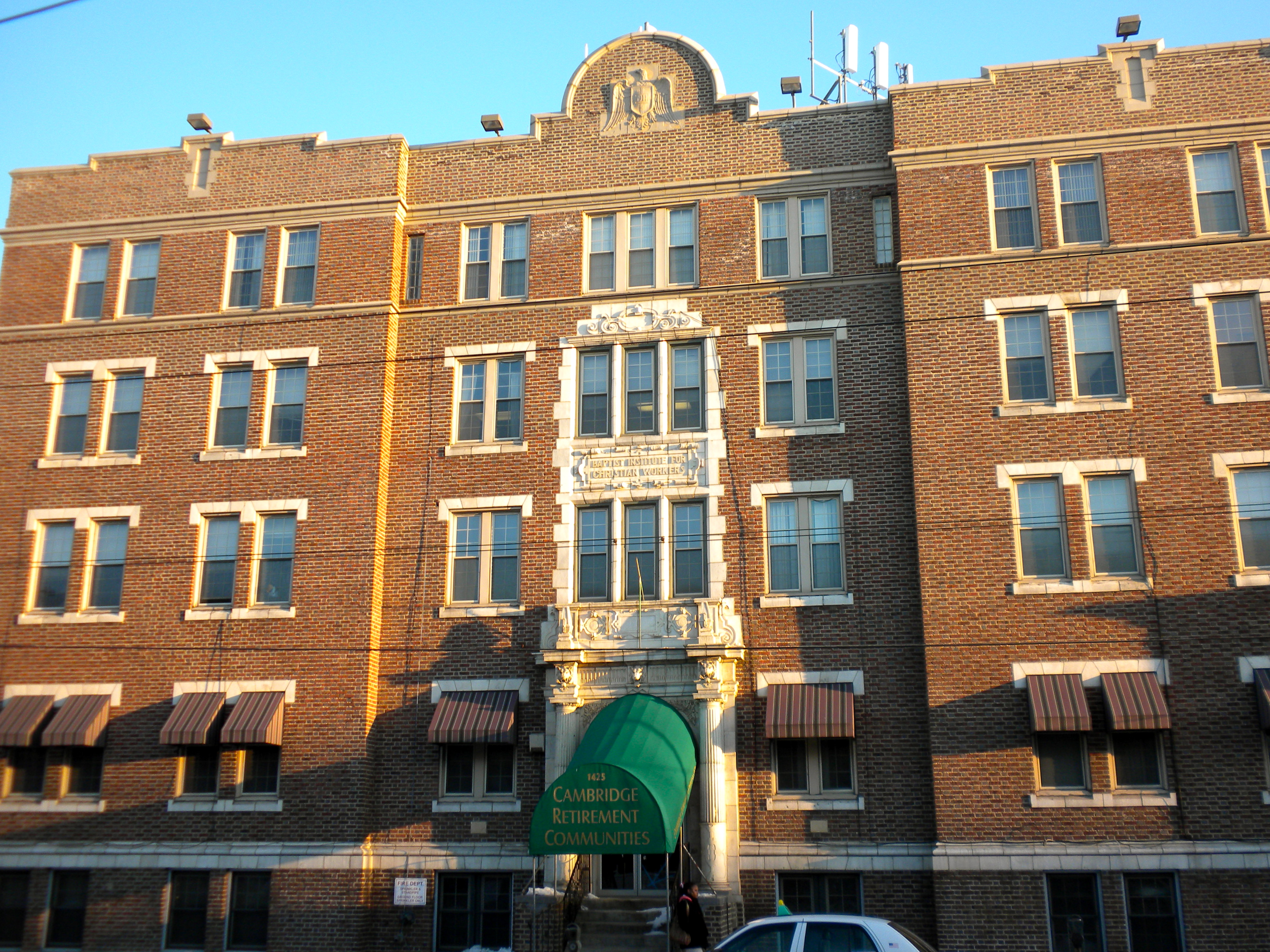

- Location within Philadelphia Location within Pennsylvania Location within the United States
- Location: 1427 Snyder Ave., Philadelphia, Pennsylvania
- Coordinates: 39°55′28″N 75°10′15″W
- Area: 0.2 acres (0.081 ha)
- Built: 1911
- Architect: Stevens, Benjamin R.
- Architectural style: Late Gothic Revival, institutional gothic
- NRHP reference No.: 83002265
- Added to NRHP: April 21, 1983

Baptist Institute for Christian Workers (also known as Crown Nursing Home and now known as Snyder House) is a historic building 1427 Snyder Avenue in Philadelphia, Pennsylvania, which has been used for several purposes and currently is a rehabilitation facility for veterans.

The unique late-Gothic Revival (Institutional Gothic) and Jacobean style building was constructed between 1911 and 1929 by Benjamin Rush Stevens for use as home to the Baptist Institute, a junior college, which later moved to Bryn Mawr and became known as Ellen Cushing Junior College. In 1952 the Navy started using the building, and in 1958 the building began use as a nursing home known as Crown Nursing Home and then later the Cambridge Retirement Community. The building was added to the National Register of Historic Places in 1983. The building was renovated in 2013 and currently is used by the Veterans' Administration at a 40-bed facility known as Snyder House for veterans recovering from homelessness and addictions.
