= Josiah Nelson Cushing =

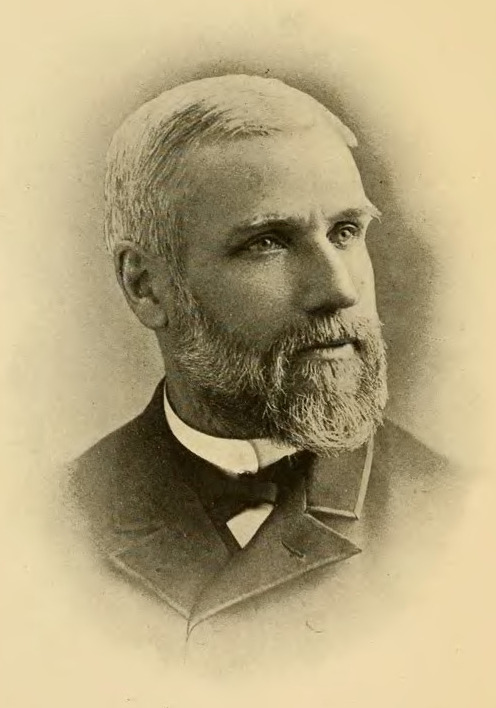
- Born: May 4, 1840; Attleboro, Massachusetts, U.S.
- Died: May 17, 1905 (aged 65); St. Louis, Missouri, U.S.
- Occupations: Missionary; linguist; translator
- Spouse: Ellen Cushing
- Children: 1 son
- Writing career
- Period: 1866–1905
- Genres: Religious texts, Linguistic reference
- Subjects: Shan language, Christianity

Josiah Nelson Cushing (J. N. Cushing) was born on 4 May 1840, at Attleboro, Bristol County, Massachusetts, United States.

Josiah Nelson Cushing was an American Baptist missionary who worked in Burma from 1866 to 1905. He was the author of the first English Grammar of the Shan Language (1871) and the first Shan-English Dictionary (1881). He was also responsible for the translation of the Holy Bible into the Shan language. In the task of translation, he was aided by a fellow missionary, Edwin D. Kelley, who died before the translation could be completed. In addition to translating the Bible into Shan, Cushing and his team of translators also worked on a catechism in related dialects.

At the age of 65, he died on May 17, 1905, in St. Louis, Missouri, USA.

He left a legacy with his book, Shan-English Dictionary, which stands firmed as an important material for referencing of the Shan language. Evidently, it has been used as a key sources for the SEALang Library, a dedicated website for online referencing and services for Southeast Asian languages.

== Family ==
His father was Alpheus Nelason Cushing, and his mother was Charlotte Everett Foster. He was married to Ellen Howard Cushing and they had a son.

== Publications ==
- Cushing, Josiah Nelson. Grammar of the Shan Language. American Mission Press, 1871.
- Cushing, J. N. A Shan and English dictionary. Rangoon: Bennett, 1881.
- Cushing, Josiah Nelson, translator. The New Testament Translated into Shan from the Original Greek. 1st edition, American Baptist Mission Press, 1882.
- Cushing, Josiah Nelson. The Shan Mission. Americ. Baptist Miss. Union, 1886.
- Cushing, Josiah Nelson. Elementary Handbook of the Shan Language: By Rev. Josiah Nelson Cushing. C. Bennett Trübner, 1880.
- Cushing, Josiah Nelson. The Holy Bible ... Translated into Shan from the Original Languages [by Josiah Nelson Cushing], Etc. American Baptist Mission Press, 1892.
- Cushing, Josiah Nelson. Buddhism in Southern Asia. [publisher not identified], 1905, http://books.google.com/books?id=-OA3AQAAMAAJ.
- Hsinbyushin, and Josiah Nelson Cushing. The Po U Daung Inscription Erected by King Sinbyuyin in 1774 A.D. Printed by the Superintendent, Gov’t. printing, 1891.
