= Liblín =

- Market town
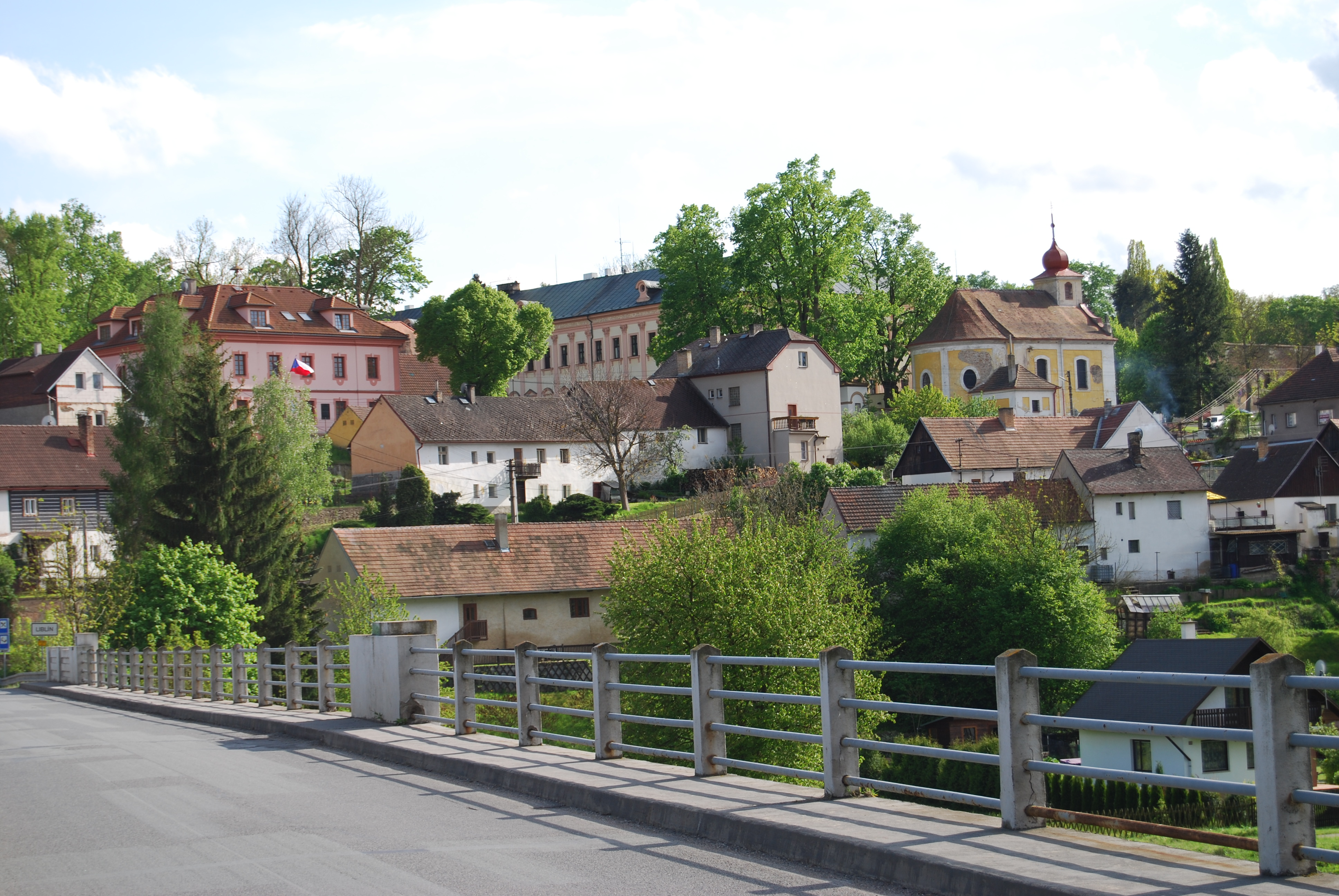
- View from the northeast

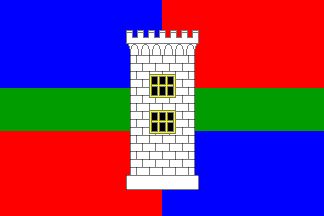
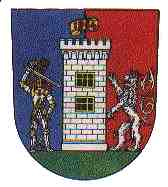
- Flag Coat of arms

- Location in the Czech Republic
- Coordinates: 49°55′0″N 13°32′39″E
- Country: Czech Republic
- Region: Plzeň
- District: Rokycany
- First mentioned: 1180

Area
  - Total: 6.05 km^{2} (2.34 sq mi)
- Elevation: 312 m (1,024 ft)

Population (2026-01-01)
  - Total: 268
  - Density: 44.3/km^{2} (115/sq mi)
- Time zone: UTC+1 (CET)
  - Summer (DST): UTC+2 (CEST)
- Postal code: 331 41
- Website: www.liblin.cz

Liblín (Czech pronunciation: [ˈlɪbliːn]) is a market town in Rokycany District in the Plzeň Region of the Czech Republic. It has about 300 inhabitants.

== Etymology ==
The initial name of the settlement was Libín (in Old Czech written as Ľubín), meaning "Liba's (court)". It the 17th century, the name evolved to Liblín.

== Geography ==
Liblín is located about 19 kilometres (12 mi) north of Rokycany and 22 km (14 mi) northeast of Plzeň. It lies in the Plasy Uplands. The highest point is the hill Na Mýti at 432 m (1,417 ft) above sea level. The municipality is situated on the right bank of the Berounka River and the market town proper is situated in its meander. The Střela River joins the Berounka on the municipal border of Liblín.

== History ==
The first written mention of Liblín is from 1180. In the second half of the 14th century, the Libštejn Castle was built near Liblín and then was bought by the Kolowrat family. The village became part of the Libštejn estate at the turn of the 14th and 15th centuries. During the Hussite Wars, Liblín was repeatedly damaged and looted. In 1510, the Libštejn estate was acquired by the Waldstein family. At the beginning of the 17th century, the estate was bought by the Gryspek family. During the Thirty Years' War, Liblín was again repeatedly looted. A new period of prosperity began in the 18th century, when a new Baroque castle was built.

In 1904, Liblín was promoted to a market town.

== Demographics ==
Historical population

Year	Pop.	±%
1869	433	—
1880	458	+5.8%
1890	441	−3.7%
1900	397	−10.0%
1910	368	−7.3%

Year	Pop.	±%
1921	357	−3.0%
1930	329	−7.8%
1950	308	−6.4%
1961	508	+64.9%
1970	431	−15.2%

Year	Pop.	±%
1980	388	−10.0%
1991	284	−26.8%
2001	301	+6.0%
2011	286	−5.0%
2021	287	+0.3%

Source: Censuses

== Transport ==
There are no railways or major roads passing through the municipality.

== Sights ==
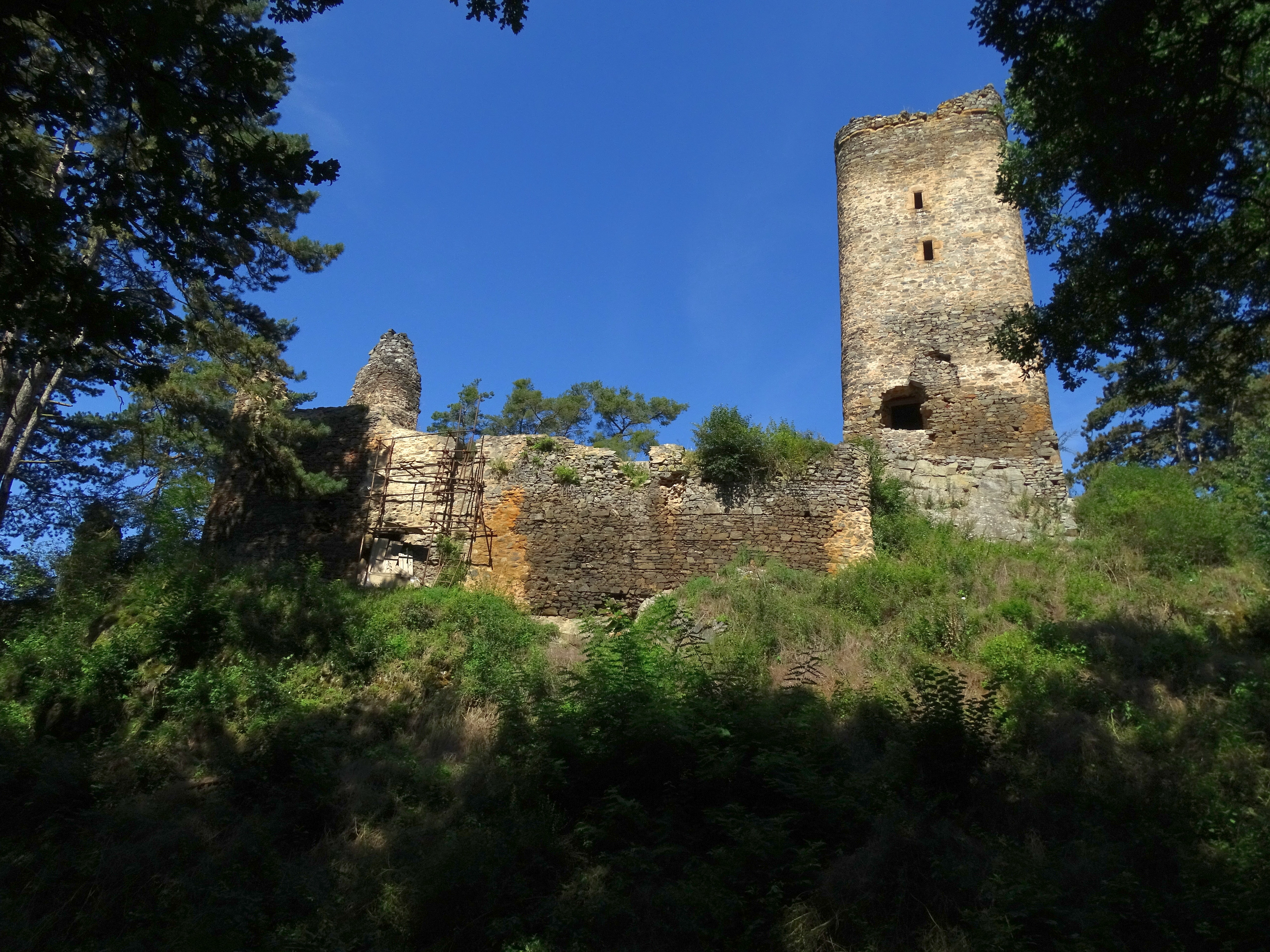
Ruin of the Libštejn Castle

The main landmarks of Liblín are the Liblín Castle and the Church of Saint John of Nepomuk. The castle was built in the late Baroque style in 1721–1725 on the site of an old Renaissance fortress. In 1845, it was modified in the Neoclasical style into its present form. Today it houses an institute of social welfare. The church was built in the castle complex in 1751–1752. Next to the castle is a park with three valuable statues of saints Joseph, Gotthard and John the Evangelist.

A tourist destination is the ruin of the Libštejn Castle. The castle was documented as abandoned in 1590 and definitively fell into disrepair during the Thirty Years' War.

A technical monument is the reinforced concrete arch road bridge that spans over the Berounka. It dates from 1929.

== Notable people ==
- Jan Jindřich Marek (1803–1853), poet
- Charles Pergler (1882–1954), diplomat and lawyer
