= Václav Marek (footballer) =

Czech footballer

Personal information
- Full name: Václav Marek
- Date of birth: 16 March 1981 (age 45)
- Place of birth: Český Brod, Czechoslovakia
- Height: 1.87 m (6 ft 1 1/2 in)
- Position: Goalkeeper

Team information
- Current team: Bohemians 1905
- Number: 28

Senior career*
Years	Team	Apps	(Gls)
2002–2004	Xaverov Horní Počernice		
2004–2005	Břevnov		
2005–2006	Xaverov Horní Počernice	49	(0)
2006–2009	1. FC Slovácko	14	(0)
2009–	Bohemians 1905	3	(0)
- * Club domestic league appearances and goals as of 29 May 2011

Václav Marek (born 16 March 1981) is a Czech football goalkeeper.
