= Jan Marek (ice hockey, born 1947) =

American ice hockey player (born 1947)

- Born: July 25, 1947 (age 79) Prague, Czechoslovakia
- Height: 5 ft 7 in (170 cm)
- Weight: 172 lb (78 kg; 12 st 4 lb)
- Position: Goaltender
- Shot: Left
- 1.GBun team: DEG Metro Stars
- NHL draft: Undrafted
- Playing career: 1979–1982

Jan Marek (born July 25, 1947) is an American retired professional ice hockey goaltender who played three seasons (1979–82) in the Eishockey-Bundesliga league for the DEG Metro Stars.
