= Václav Marek (writer) =

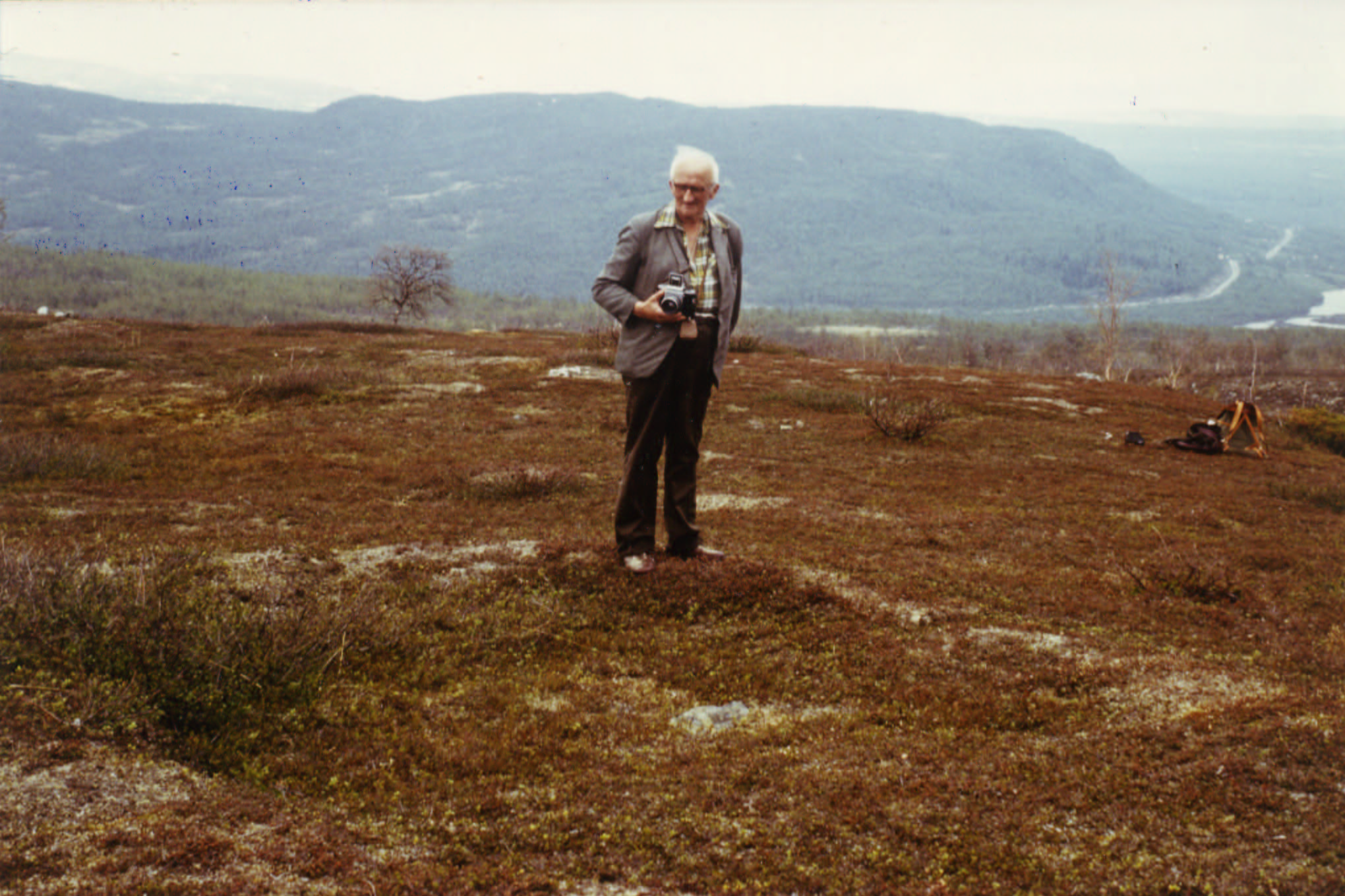
- Václav Marek in Börgefjell in 1979
- Born: 5 March 1908; Sadská, Austria-Hungary (now Czech Republic)
- Died: 5 March 1994 (aged 85); Prague, Czech Republic
- Occupations: writer, traveller, publicist, researcher
- Writing career
- Language: Czech
- Period: 1936–1994
- Genres: Sami languages, Sami people

Václav Marek (5 March 1908 – 14 May 1994) was a Czechoslovak writer, traveller, publicist, researcher of Saami languages.

== Early life ==
Václav Marek was born in Sadská in 1908 to parents Antonín Marek and Marie Mareková (b. Němečková). His father died in 1913, his mother in 1924. He studied in Poděbrady in an economic school in 1923−1924. After 2 years break he served as an apprentice in Studený, and then in a mill in Sadská, in order to help to feed his family. In the mill he lost his left hand in 1926. In 1928 he worked in Lomnice nad Popelkou for a while for architectural firms, then returned to his birth village, but he had no work. In 1929 he went abroad, visited 20 countries in Europe, where he started to write stories. His father, who travelled in Algeria, China or Vietnam, because he served in the French Legion between 1902 and 1906, also wrote stories. In 1931 he settled down in Norway in Lapland, where nowadays Børgefjell National Park is located. During World War II he participated in the Norwegian resistance movement. In 1948 he returned to Czechoslovakia. He worked at a biological research department, where he wrote several articles about hunting and forestry. From 1951 he worked at Research Institute of Forestry in Zbraslav, focusing on soil zoology. From 1955 he worked for the Czechoslovak Academy of Agricultural Sciences as an expert abstractor. The museum in Hattfjelldal Municipality organized an exhibition of Marek's pictures taken during his Norwegian stay. In the Børgefjell National Park there is also a trail dedicated to his memory, called Marek's Trail.

== Work ==
Since the 1940s he wrote articles about the Sami history, culture and religion. The magazine Czechoslovak Ethnographie published several articles on religion and culture of the Samis. He also wrote a trilogy played in Lapland (Susendal) between the 18 and 20th centuries. Marek's photos are often published in Norwegian ethnographic and historiographic works. His own memories are kept in the National Museum in Prague and they were shown in two exhibitions in the Czech Republic.

== Published books, articles and reviews ==
- Vodopád Finský skok. In Ahoj IV, 1936, 23, str. 14
- Nahoře na Susně. In Ahoj IV, 1936, 7, str. 6
- Zapomenutí. Ze života španělských rybářů. In Ahoj IV, 1936, 6, str. 6
- O staré osamocené Laponce. Věčné štěstí. In Ahoj V, 1937, 29, str. 22
- Vyděděnci Severu. In Ahoj V, 1937, 37, str. 11
- Čechoslovák u sedláků za polárním kruhem. In Ahoj V, 1937, 42, str. 12
- Rybář u skandinávských řek a jezer. In Ahoj VI, 1938, 12, str. 12-13
- Nomádi na severu. In Letem světem XII, 1938, 25, str. 8-10
- Náš ptačí svět na severu Evropy. In Naší přírodou II, 1938, 8, str. 281-283
- Kvíčaly. In Vesmír XX, 1942, 7
- Lopaři. In Věda a život XV, 1949, 2, str. 63-73
- K zazvěřování našich hor. In Stráž myslivosti XXVII, 1949, 3, str. 19-20
- O škodlivosti káně rousné. In Stráž myslivosti XXVII, 1949, 9, str. 93-94
- Vysazování a zdomácnění severské zvěře I. In Stráž myslivosti XXVII, 1949, 20, str. 198-201
- Vysazování a zdomácnění severské zvěře II. In Stráž myslivosti XXVII, 1949, 21, str. 209
- O kaňkování kun. In Stráž myslivosti XXVII, 1949, 23–24, str. 235-237
- Obydlí a stavby u Laponců. In Československá Ethnografie (dále jen ČSE) II, 1954, str. 176-199
- Výzkum půdní zvířeny ve smrkovém pralese na Pradědu. In Práce VÚ lesnických v ČSR, Praha 1954
- O dávných náboženských představách Laponců. In ČSE, III, 1955, str. 352-373
- Väinö Kaukonen: Kuusitoista Elias Lönnrotin kirjettä Jakov Grotille. In ČSE III, 1955, str. 425-426
- K otázce přežitků totemistických představ u Laponců. In ČSE IV, 1956, str. 38-54
- Väinö Kaukonen, Karjalais-suomalainen kansanrunous karjalan Kansan alkuperäkysymyksen valossa. In ČSE VI, 1958, str. 214-215
- Inga Serning, Lappska offerplatsfynd från järnalder och medeltid i de svenska lappmarkena. In ČSE VI, 1958, str. 317-318
- Žena v dávném laponském náboženství. In ČSE, VII, 1959, str. 261-274
- Říše saivů, Jabmeaimo a názory dávných Laponců o životě a smrti. In ČSE, VII, 1959, str. 386-399
- Laponské pohádky a pověsti a jejich zhodnocení pro všeobecnou folkloristiku. In ČSE IX, 1961, str. 177-191
- K antropologii jižních Laponců. In Zpravodaj Československé společnosti anthropologické XVII, 2, 1964, str. 4-11
- Z minulosti Laponska. In Lidé a země 5, 1971, str. 221-224
- Kočovníci věčné touhy. Blok: Brno 1972
- Laponština trochu jinak. In Neděle s LD (příloha Lidové demokracie) 1974, 38, str. 10, 21.9.
- Svátek Lucie. In Neděle s LD (příloha Lidové demokracie) 1976, 49, str. 10, 11.12.
- Samene i Susendalen. Hattfjelldal kommune: Hattfjelldal 1992
- Saamský kalendář a dělení času v dějinách Severu. In Cargo, časopis pro kulturní/sociální antropologii, 1999, II/1, Praha, str. 3-17
- Interferenční mechanika I. In Nomáda, studentský časopis pro filosofii, 1999, 3., Praha, str. 11-13
- Noidova smrt. Pohádky a pověsti z Laponska. Triáda: Praha 2000
- Život Sámů. In Severské listy 2001/3 (červen 2001)
- Rosomák z Vraních hor. In Severské listy, prosinec 2001, str. 26-27
- Černé děti. In Severské listy 1/2004, str. 24-25
- Staré laponské náboženství. P. Mervart / ÚJB FF MU: Červený Kostelec 2009
