= Stella Marek Cushing =

American folklorist (1893–1938)

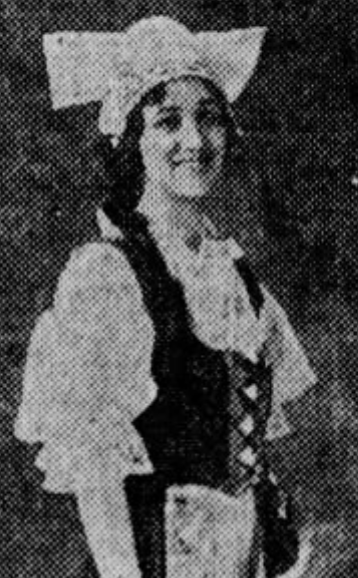
- Stella Marek Cushing, from a 1928 newspaper
- Born: 1893; New York City, U.S.
- Died: April 14, 1938 (aged 44–45); Montclair, New Jersey, U.S.
- Occupation(s): Folklorist, violinist, folk dancer, educator, writer

Stella Marek Cushing (1893 – April 14, 1938) was an American folklorist and violinist. She taught about, performed, and collected folk music, dances, and costumes from Eastern and Central Europe, and organized folk dance and music events in the United States.

== Early life and education ==
Marek was born in New York City and raised in Worcester, Massachusetts, the daughter of William Marek and Frances Pospisil Marek. Both of her parents immigrated from Bohemia, and her first language was Czech. Her mother died in 1901. Marek showed talent at the violin from an early age.

== Career ==
Cushing traveled in Europe collecting folk music. She taught and performed European folk music and dance, sometimes wearing traditional costumes, in Europe and the United States. "The program that Stella Marek Cushing presents is both educational and entertaining," explained a 1929 newspaper, "but it is even more the endeavor of a gifted daughter of a great people to bring to the America she loves something of the culture and art and music of her fatherland."

Cushing was credited as an arranger on several recordings of folk songs for the Victor label in 1936 and 1937. In 1936, she co-directed a folk festival in Montclair, New Jersey. In 1937, she was decorated by the Czech government with the Order of the White Lion, for her contributions to Czech culture. She served on the executive board of the Folk Festival Council of New York, and taught at the American Institute of Normal Methods in Massachusetts. She was active in the Universalist Church. "I believe that a fuller knowledge of the life and culture of a foreign people will do as much toward bringing about goodwill and understanding between nations as any amount of political and economic education," she told an interviewer in 1934.

== Publications ==
- Songs of work and worship (1923)
- "Trips Abroad: Russia and Ukraine", "Trips Abroad: Poland and Czechoslovakia", "Trips Abroad, Sweden", "Trips Abroad: The Southern Slavs", "Trips Abroad: Italy", "Trips Abroad: Japan", "Trips Abroad: China", "A Playground in Kiev", "At the Frontier", "Christ is Born", "Street Scene in Hong Kong", "Plays, Pageants, and Festivals", "Midsummer Magic", "At Home in Japan", and "Vendemmia", in Music Highways and Byways

== Personal life and legacy ==
Marek married engineer Samuel Truman Cushing in 1917. They had a son, Donald. She died in 1938, in her forties, at her home in Montclair, New Jersey. There is a box of her papers in the collection of the New York Public Library. The Montclair Library established a folklore collection as a memorial to Cushing. In 1948, pianist Harriet Cohen and librarian Margery Quigley gave special books to the Montclair Library in Cushing's memory.
