= Morton (surname) =

- Place of origin: British Isles

Morton is an English, Irish, and Scottish surname. Notable people with the surname include:

== A–K ==
- Adam Morton (1945–2020), Canadian philosopher
- Alan Morton (disambiguation), several people
- Alexander Morton (disambiguation), several people
- Alexandra Morton (born 1957), American and Canadian marine biologist
- Alicia Morton (born 1987), American actress
- Amy Morton (born 1959), American actress
- Andrew Morton (disambiguation), several people
- (Arthur) Leslie Morton, communist historian and educator
- Behren Morton (born 2002), American football player
- Bill Morton (disambiguation), several people
- Bubba Morton (1931–2006), American baseball player and coach
- Cale Morton (born 1990), Australian footballer
- Charles Morton (disambiguation), several people
- Chesley V. Morton (born 1951), American politician, stockbroker
- Chris Morton (born 1956), English motorcycle speedway rider
- Craig Morton (1943–2026), American professional football player
- Craig Morton (rugby union) (born 1961), Australian international rugby union player
- Cynthia C. Morton (born 1955), American geneticist
- David Morton (disambiguation), several people
- Desiree Morton, American politician
- Dudley W. Morton (1907–1943), US Navy submarine commander during World War Two
- Eddie Morton (1870–1938), An American ragtime singer
- Edward Morton (disambiguation), several people
- Eleanor Morton, Scottish comedian
- Euan Morton (born 1977) is a Scottish actor, singer, and voiceover artist.
- Frederic Morton (1924-2015), author
- Genevieve Morton (born 1986) South African top model
- Harry Morton (disambiguation), several people
- Henry Morton (politician) (1867–1932), Australian politician
- Henry Morton (scientist) (1836–1902), scientist, first president of Stevens Institute of Technology
- Henry Vollam Morton (1892–1979), journalist and writer
- Ian Morton (born 1970), English cricketer
- Jalen Morton (born 1997), American football player
- James St. Clair Morton (1829–1864), American military officer
- Jelly Roll Morton (1885/1890–1941), influential jazz pianist, bandleader and composer
- Jenny Morton, New Zealand neurobiologist and academic
- Joe Morton (born 1947), American actor
- John Morton (disambiguation), several people
- Jordan Morton, Scottish footballer
- Joy Morton, Morton Salt Company owner
- Julius Sterling Morton (1832–1902), United States Secretary of Agriculture
- Kate Morton (born 1976), Australian author
- Kathy Morton, professional name used by Kathy Godfrey early in her broadcasting career
- Keith William Morton (born 1930), British mathematician
- Kendall Morton, Australian politician

== L–Z ==
- Les Morton (born 1958), English racewalker
- Levi P. Morton (1824–1920), 22nd vice-president of the United States
- Lindsay Morton, American cancer epidemiologist
- Lorraine H. Morton (1918–2018), American politician and educator
- Marcus Morton (1784–1864), Governor of Massachusetts
- Marcus Morton (jurist) (1819–1891), Chief Justice of the Massachusetts Supreme Judicial Court
- Mark Morton (disambiguation), several people
- Mary Morton (1879–1965), British sculptor
- Mary Morton Masters (1867–1917), New Zealand artist
- May Morton (1894–1965), English actress
- Michael Morton (disambiguation), several people
- Oliver Hazard Perry Morton (1823–1877), U.S. senator from Indiana
- Parker Morton (1911–1995), Australian rules footballer and coach
- Paul Morton (disambiguation), several people
- Peter Morton, a founder of Hard Rock Cafe and owner of Hard Rock Hotel in Las Vegas
- Philip Morton (disambiguation), several people
- PJ Morton (born 1981), American singer
- Ralph Morton (1896–1985), puisne judge of the High Court of Southern Rhodesia
- Ray Morton, English motorcycle speedway rider
- Richard Morton (disambiguation), several people
- Ricky Morton (born 1956), professional wrestler
- Robert Morton (disambiguation), several people
- Runako Morton (1978–2012), West Indian cricketer
- Samantha Morton (born 1977), Academy Award-nominated English actress
- Samuel Morton (1894–1923), Chicago mobster
- Samuel George Morton (1799–1851), American physician and natural scientist
- Sebastian Arocha Morton, American record producer
- Susan Morton, New Zealand professor of epidemiology and population health
- Tex Morton (1916–1983), New Zealand entertainer, songwriter, actor, stage hypnotist, and hypnotherapist
- Thomas Morton (disambiguation), several people
- Tyler Morton (born 2002), English footballer
- Wal Morton, English motorcycle speedway rider
- Wendy Morton (born 1967), British politician
- William Morton (disambiguation), several people

== See also ==
- Earl of Morton, a title in the Scottish peerage
- Justice Morton (disambiguation)
- Morton (disambiguation)
- Moreton (disambiguation)
- Morten
