= Justice Morton =

Justice Morton may refer to:

- James Madison Morton Sr. (1837–1923), associate justice of the Massachusetts Supreme Judicial Court
- John Morton (American politician) (1725–1777), associate justice of the Supreme Court of Pennsylvania
- Marcus Morton (1784–1864), associate justice of the Massachusetts Supreme Judicial Court
- Marcus Morton (judge) (1819–1891), chief justice of the Massachusetts Supreme Judicial Court, and son of the previous
- Sir Ralph Morton (1896–1985), puisne judge of the High Court of Southern Rhodesia

== See also ==
- Judge Morton (disambiguation)
