= Senator Morton =

Senator Morton may refer to:

== Members of the United States Senate ==
- Jackson Morton (1794–1874), U.S. Senator from Florida from 1849 to 1855
- Oliver P. Morton (1823–1877), U.S. Senator from Indiana from 1867 to 1877
- Thruston Ballard Morton (1907–1982), U.S. Senator from Kentucky from 1957 to 1968

== United States state senate members ==
- Bob Morton (politician) (1934–2015), Washington State Senate
- Earl D. Morton (1918–1995), Wisconsin State Senate
- Harry Kemp Morton (1905–1994), New York State Senate
- Margaret E. Morton (1924–2012), Connecticut State Senate

== See also ==
- Morton (surname)
