= Walbridge A. Field =

American judge (1833–1899)

Walbridge Abner Field
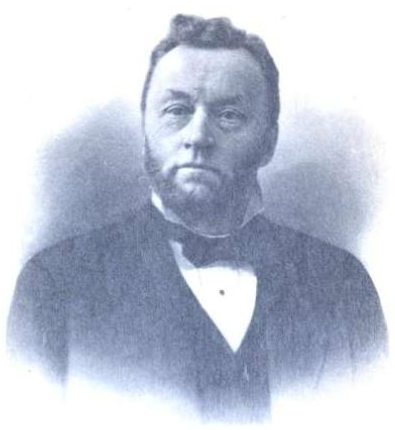

Member of the U.S. House of Representatives from Massachusetts's 3rd district
- In office March 4, 1877 – March 28, 1878
- Preceded by: Henry L. Pierce
- Succeeded by: Benjamin Dean
- In office March 4, 1879 – March 3, 1881
- Preceded by: Benjamin Dean
- Succeeded by: Ambrose Ranney

Associate Justice of the Massachusetts Supreme Judicial Court
- In office February 21, 1881 – September 4, 1890
- Appointed by: John Davis Long
- Preceded by: Seth Ames
- Succeeded by: James Madison Morton Sr.

12th Chief Justice of the Massachusetts Supreme Judicial Court
- In office September 4, 1890 – July 15, 1899
- Appointed by: John Quincy Adams Brackett
- Preceded by: Marcus Morton
- Succeeded by: Oliver Wendell Holmes Jr.

Member of the Boston Common Council (wards 5 and 8)
- In office 1865–1867

Member of the Boston School Committee
- In office 1863–1864

Personal details
- Born: April 26, 1833 Springfield, Vermont, U.S.
- Died: July 15, 1899 (aged 66) Boston, Massachusetts, U.S.
- Party: Republican
- Spouse(s): October 4, 1869 Eliza E. McLoon (died March 1877), October 31, 1882 Frances Farwell
- Children: Eleanor Louise, Elizabeth Lenthal
- Education: Dartmouth College; Harvard Law School
- Profession: Lawyer

Walbridge Abner Field (April 26, 1833 – July 15, 1899) was an American lawyer, jurist and politician who served as a member of the United States House of Representatives from Massachusetts, and as the chief justice of the Massachusetts Supreme Judicial Court.

== Biography ==
He was born in North Springfield, Vermont on April 26, 1833. He graduated from Dartmouth College in 1855, where he also served as a tutor. He studied law in Boston, Massachusetts and at the Harvard Law School. Field was admitted to the bar in 1860 and commenced practice in Boston. He served as a member of the City's school committee, and represented wards 5 and 8 on Boston's Common Council.

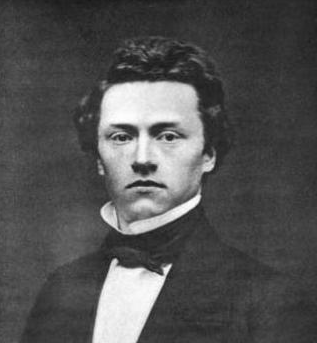
Walbridge Abner Field as a young man

Field was appointed assistant United States Attorney in 1865, serving in this capacity until April 1869, when he was appointed Assistant Attorney General of the United States, holding this office until August 1870, when he resigned and resumed his law practice.

In 1876, Walbridge ran for a seat in Congress against Democrat Benjamin Dean. Initially the count showed that Dean was ahead by 44 votes. Dean's margin shrank to seven votes after a recount. A committee reviewing the election results found that 25 votes were cast for Field in the 4th District. The Board of Canvassers determined that those were votes that were intended to be made for Field and the Boston Board of Aldermen voted to include those votes. After the final count, Field was declared the winner by five votes.

Dean contested the election in the House of Representatives regarding the results of the election. Massachusetts Congressman Benjamin Butler, a Republican at the time, had a personal dislike of Field, according to news accounts of the time, and supported efforts to unseat Field in the House. The Committee on Elections held hearings on the matter and voted 6-5 to unseat Field and seat Dean instead. On March 27, 1878, the House voted 120-119 in favor of Dean with Republican Butler voting in the majority. After initially supporting Field, Rep. James T. Jones of Alabama flipped his vote to Dean, saying that even though the facts supported Field, "that he had no right to have opinions of his own, and had surrendered them to the dictates of his colleagues."

In the 1878 elections, Field faced off with Dean in a rematch. The election included allegations from Butler that Field held anti-Irish views as he had once advertised for a servant in which he specified that he sought a Protestant and 'no Irish need apply". Field won the election by a larger majority; however, Dean again challenged the result charging irregularities with the count. This time, Walbridge was seated and served out his term. He declined to run for another term of office in 1880.

Field was appointed by Governor John Davis Long to the bench of the Massachusetts Supreme Judicial Court on February 21, 1881. He was promoted by Governor John Quincy Adams Brackett to the position of Chief Justice on September 4, 1890 and served until his death in Boston on July 15, 1899. He was succeeded by Oliver Wendell Holmes. His interment was in Forest Hills Cemetery in West Roxbury.

Political offices
Preceded by Henry L. Pierce	Member of the U.S. House of Representatives from Massachusetts's 3rd congressional district March 4, 1877 – March 28, 1878	Succeeded by Benjamin Dean
Preceded by Benjamin Dean	Member of the U.S. House of Representatives from Massachusetts's 3rd congressional district March 4, 1879 – March 3, 1881	Succeeded by Ambrose Ranney
Legal offices
Preceded by Seth Ames	Associate Justice of the Massachusetts Supreme Judicial Court; February 21, 1881 – September 4, 1890	Succeeded by James Madison Morton Sr.
Preceded by Marcus Morton	Chief Justice of the Massachusetts Supreme Judicial Court; September 4, 1890 – July 15, 1899	Succeeded by Oliver Wendell Holmes Jr.
