= Walter Lofthouse Dean =

American painter (1854–1912)

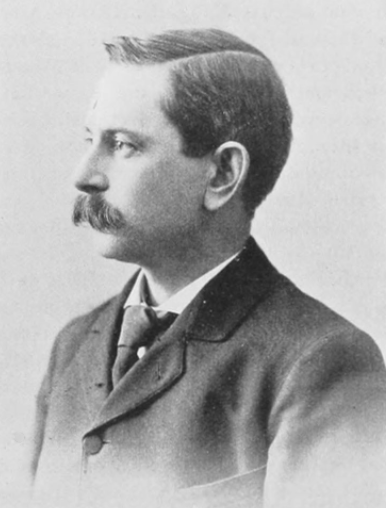
- Portrait of Dean, circa 1896
- Born: Walter Lofthouse Dean; June 4, 1854; Lowell, Massachusetts
- Died: March 12, 1912 (aged 57); Gloucester, Massachusetts
- Education: Massachusetts Institute of Technology, Massachusetts College of Art and Design, Pupil of M Achille Oudinot, Académie Julian
- Known for: Painting
- Notable work: from United States, Canada, France, Belgium, Netherlands, England, Italy, Puerto Rico
- Awards: 1895 Massachusetts Charitable Mechanics Association Silver Medal, 1904 St Louis Exposition Medal
- Elected: Vice President of Boston Art Club, President of South Boston Art Club, Paintings Juror 1900 Paris Expo, Rear Commodore of Boston Yacht Club

Walter Lofthouse Dean (June 4, 1854 – March 13, 1912) was an American marine painter, commodore of the Boston Yacht Club and Vice President of the Boston Art Club. Dean was one of the most prominent members in Boston, Massachusetts of the Paint and Clay Club, the Art Club, the Society of Water Color Painters, the South Boston Art Club and was also a member of the Salmagundi Club of New York and on the Massachusetts jury of paintings for the 1900 Paris Exposition.

Dean was also one of first artists to work primarily from Gloucester, Massachusetts, where he worked for 25 summers from a large studio on Rocky Neck, and later settled year round. While Dean is primarily known for marine paintings from the Boston region, he also created a wide-range of art from his travels to France, the Netherlands, Italy, Belgium, England, Canada and Puerto Rico.

Dean was a well recognized artist while he was alive and was listed in the 1896 Men of Progress, the 1903 Men of Massachusetts, along with Who's Who in American Art. His canvases were seen in most of the important general exhibitions for more than a quarter century. Dean's largest painting, Peace (see below: Peace), depicting several units of the White Squadron in Boston harbor, is owned by the US Government and was exhibited at the Chicago World's Fair in May–October 1893.

Walter Lofthouse Dean died at his home in Gloucester, Massachusetts, on March 13, 1912.

== Family ==
Walter Lofthouse Dean was born on June 4, 1854, in Lowell, Massachusetts, in Middlesex County. He was the third son of the Honorable Benjamin Dean and Mary Ann (French) Dean, who were related to several of the best-known families of the region. Walter Dean's grandparents, Benjamin Dean and Alice Lofthouse Dean, of Clitheroe, England, moved to the United States of America in 1829, when Benjamin, an engraver and designer, entered the employ of the Merrimack Print Works.

Dean's father, Benjamin Dean was born in Clitheroe, England in 1824, and became a prominent Boston lawyer, a US Congressman and a 33-degree Mason who served as grand master of the Grand Commandery of the United States from 1880 to 1883. His mother, Mary Ann French, was born to Josiah Bowers French, a bank president and former Mayor of Lowell, and his wife, Mary Anne Stevens of Billerica, Massachusetts.

Dean had three brothers and two sisters. He never knew his oldest brother, Josiah French Dean, who died before the age of two. His second oldest brother, Benjamin Wheelock Dean, was a contractor who married Annie Page of South Boston. His younger sister, Clitheroe, was born in South Boston and married Charles L. James of Brookline. His youngest brother, Josiah Stevens Dean married May Lillian Smith in 1888 and became a prominent Boston lawyer and judge who died in 1941. Dean's youngest sister, Mary Dean, was born in Lowell and married Walter Tufts.

Dean married Katharine Bates Whiting of Boston on July 1, 1874 and together they had two daughters, May (1875) and Clitheroe (1879).

== Nautical life ==
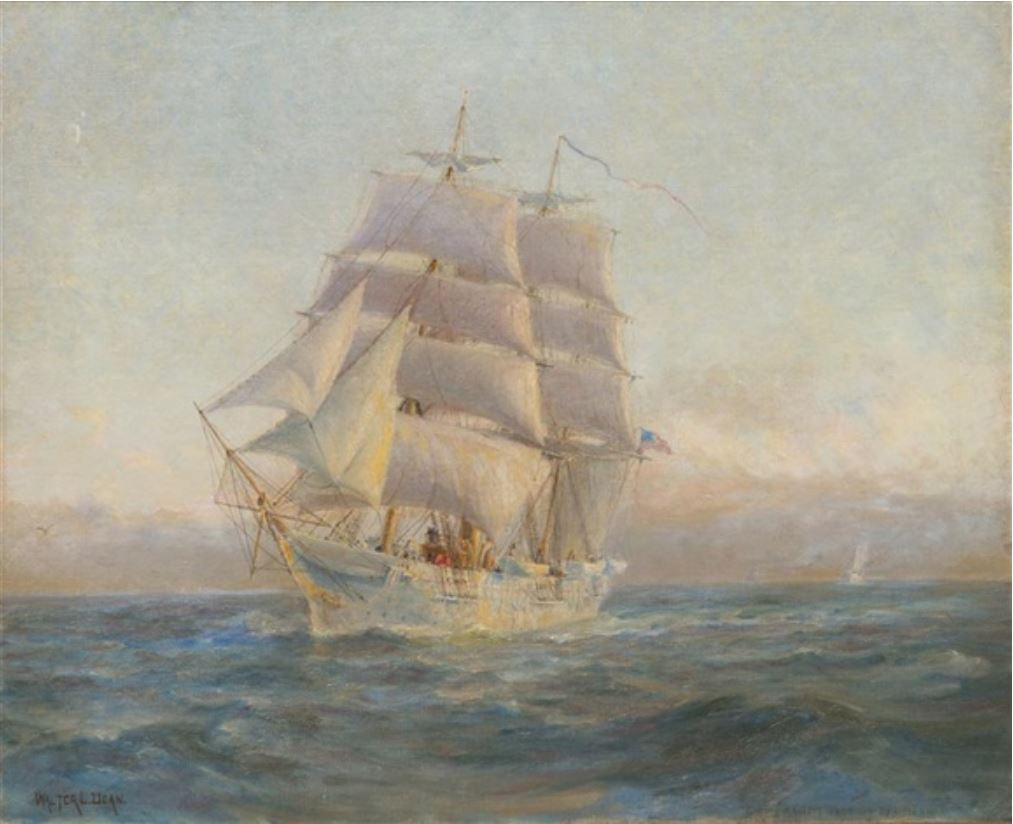
U.S.S. Enterprise, ca 1895

Dean was always fascinated by the sea and was a life member, trustee and one-time commodore of the Boston Yacht Club. Early in his teens, through his love of adventure and fondness of the sea, he made a cruise of a month on a Gloucester fishing vessel to the Banks; and, when a school boy, he passed every possible moment out of school hours on the water. His cat-boat Fannie was long the fastest boat of her size, and took first prize in many races. In 1885, after his return from Europe, Dean fitted up a yacht of twenty-six tons, and set out on a four-month sketching cruise along the New England coast, visiting every port between Boston and Eastport, acting as his own skipper and pilot. Later he made more extended voyages on the barkentine Christiana Redman and the bark Woodside for the purposes of becoming familiar with square-rigged vessels. He made several voyages out of Gloucester on fishing vessels. Shortly before his death, which occurred in 1912, he spent an entire summer nominally as ship's carpenter (since law would not permit his going as a passenger) aboard one of the whalers out of Bedford. During this voyage, which was confined to the North Atlantic ground off Cape Hatteras, he made valuable sketches and studies of present-day whaling operations.

== Early life and education ==
Dean was serious about his career as an artist from an early age, though there may have been some family pressure to pursue a more financially certain career path in the cotton textile industry. After graduating from public school, Dean left Boston to learn all details of the cotton manufacturing business at a mill in Tilton, New Hampshire. While at this mill, he learned all aspect of the business as an apprentice working at each of the machines and offices within the factory. Dean ultimately decided that he did not want to enter the cotton manufacturing business.

Dean attended the Massachusetts Institute of Technology's School of Architecture in 1873, but left MIT to study the fine arts at the Massachusetts State Normal Art School (now known as Mass College of Art & Design) where his brother's father-in-law, Walter Smith (art educator), was co-founder and Principal. While a student at the Normal Art School, Dean was an instructor at the Boston Art Academy. Upon graduating a four year program in three years from the Normal Art School, Dean became an instructor at Purdue University, in Lafayette, Indiana, in 1876. In 1877, Dean returned to Boston to become a teacher of drawing at the Boston Free Evening Drawing School.

== Learning from a Master (1881) ==
After trying ranch life for one month in Texas, in 1881 Dean returned to Boston, where he studied painting under the direction of Achille Oudinot, a pupil of Jean-Baptiste-Camille Corot and Charles-François Daubigny. This master awakened a deeper insight into the soul of things, and helped him to get a better idea of composition, atmosphere, perspective, light and shade.

== Europe and the Académie Julian (1882–84) ==
After earning $2,500 from the sale of his paintings, in 1882, at the age of 28, Dean traveled to France, where he first spent seven months on the French coast, sketching the local people and boats in Brittany. He then went on to Paris, France to study at the Académie Julian with Jules-Joseph Lefebvre and Gustave Boulanger. These were two of the most influential art instructors in the world at that time. It is apparent that Dean enjoyed Europe, where he traveled primarily along the coastlines of France, Belgium, the Netherlands, Italy and England. In England, he secured an old chapel as a studio in the village of Cornwall, and finished a number commissions for "Manchester gentleman" of Mediterranean scenes.

== Peace (1891) ==
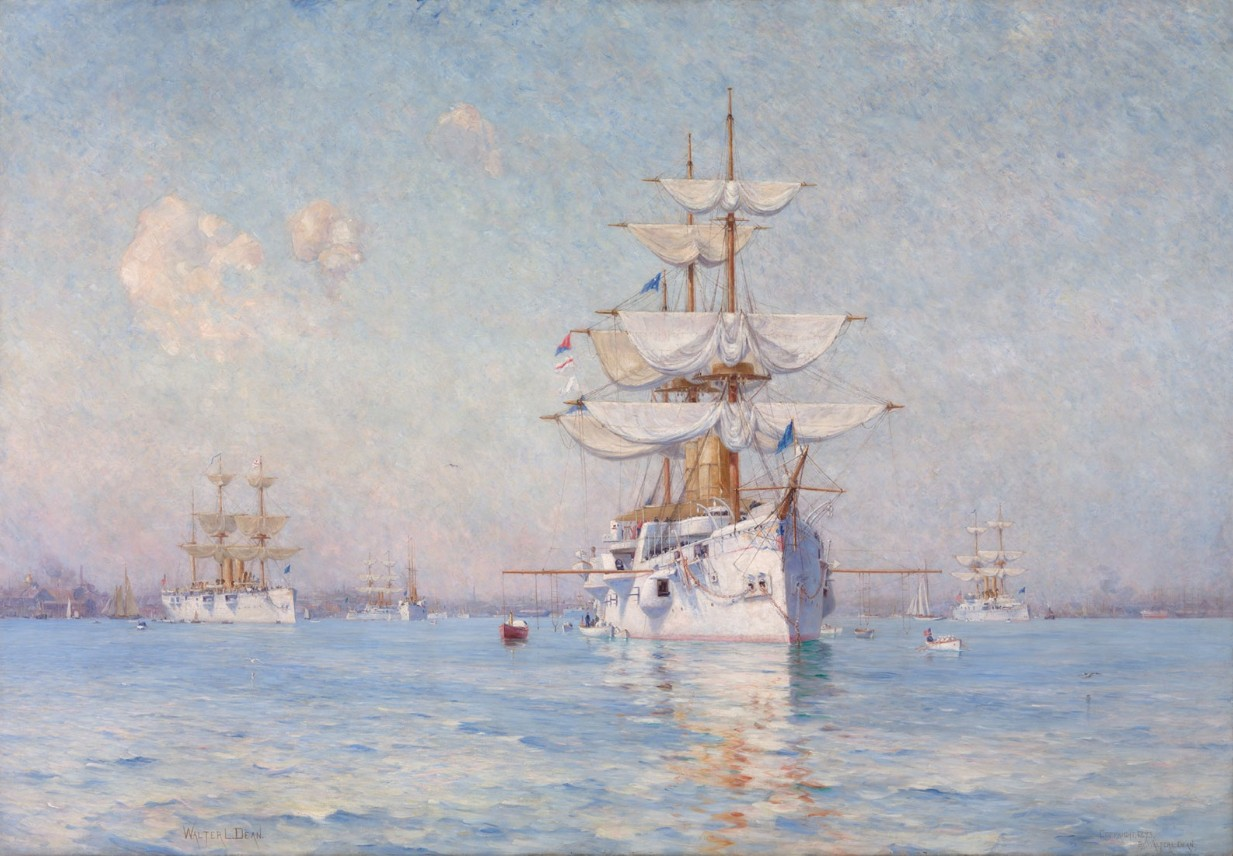
Peace, 1891

Perhaps Dean's most important work, Peace (see image) is a large painting (9 × 6.25 ft or 274 × 191 cm) depicting the original US Navy fleet at rest in Boston Harbor. Peace was completed in 1891, exhibited widely from 1891 to 1900, placed in the US Capitol in 1900 and purchased by the US Government in 1928. Known variously as "The White Squadron" and "The Squadron of Evolution", this impressive fleet of white-hulled, ironclad, steam and sail-powered naval war ships was built to protect America's growing commercial ventures at sea in the late 19th century.

An 1895 article in the Boston Sunday Journal had the following to say about Peace.

Peace is perhaps the best known marine work of an American artist. It pleased the public as soon as it was shown [to] them, for it was almost the first prominent attempt made to introduce modern war ships into real art. When the North Atlantic squadron came into Boston Harbor a few years ago, Mr. Dean anchored his yacht alongside the white war ships, and secured studies for his painting.

— Mahlstick, May 12, 1895

The US House Resolution 5454 in 1900, which proposed to purchase "Peace" for $15,000, states the following:

The bill proposes to purchase an historical painting entitled "Peace" by Walter L. Dean of Boston, Massachusetts. It represents "The Squadron of Evolution," better known as "The White Squadron," as constituted in 1891, lying peacefully at anchor in the harbor of Boston. This squadron is the nucleus of the present Navy. The Chicago as originally constructed was bark rigged, and it is in the foreground of the painting. The Boston and Atlanta are represented as brig rigged, while the Newark is bark rigged and the Yorktown is schooner rigged. These vessels have since been reconstructed to meet modern requirements, so that their original identity has been lost. "Peace" shows them as originally constructed, and is a means of keeping in view the type of ship which started the Navy of which every American is justly proud. There is no question among the minds of your committee but what it is perfectly proper that this historical painting should be owned by the Government and hung in a suitable place in the Capitol building.

The painting is 9 feet long [274 cm] by 6 feet 3 inches high [191 cm]. Wherever it has been exhibited nothing but praise has been bestowed upon it. It was shown at the Columbian Exposition in Chicago in 1892 [1893], where it occupied a place of honor in the United States section of the fine arts department. It was then exhibited at the St. Louis Museum of Fine Arts, and afterwards sent to the Museum of Fine Arts in Boston. It was next shown in the art gallery of the Massachusetts Mechanic's Association fair, and later in the public library under the auspices of the Worcester Art Society. Later it was sent to the Tennessee Centennial Exposition at Nashville, and also to the public library at Bridgeport, Conn. Then at the Boston South End Exposition, and last summer at Poland Springs, Me. Where it was placed in the building which had previously been the Maine State Building at the Chicago Exposition. In all these places this work of art occupied the place of honor and received many awards.

There is perhaps no painting of recent years which has been more favorably received and commented upon wherever seen by artists, art critics, naval officers, and the public generally than "Peace." Mr. Dean is an American artist who stands high in the profession and has no superior as a maritime painter. He has made a life study of the sea and sea craft. The painting is entirely emblematic of peace. It was made when the country was at peace. There is no similar picture in existence, the idea being an original one with Mr. Dean. There are only two other marine pictures in the Capitol building, and they both represent war. There should be a painting of peace. Your committee, therefore, recommends passage of the bill.

Peace was first hung in the Capitol in 1900, in the room of the House Committee on Naval Affairs. The painting remained with the committee throughout various relocations in the Capitol and, in 1919, to the Cannon House Office Building; Peace has been on view in room 311.

== The Seiners ==
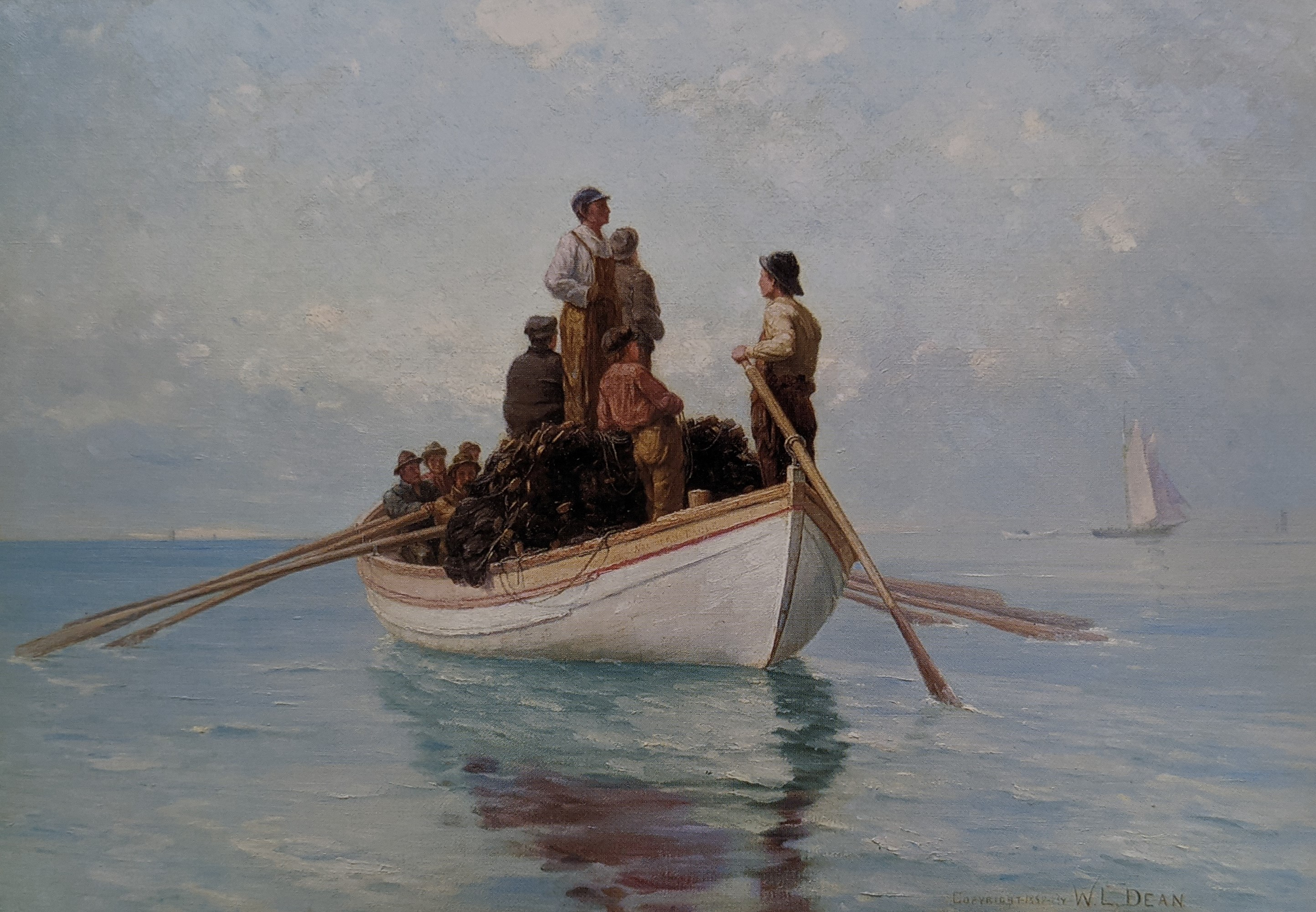
The Gloucester Seiners, 1888

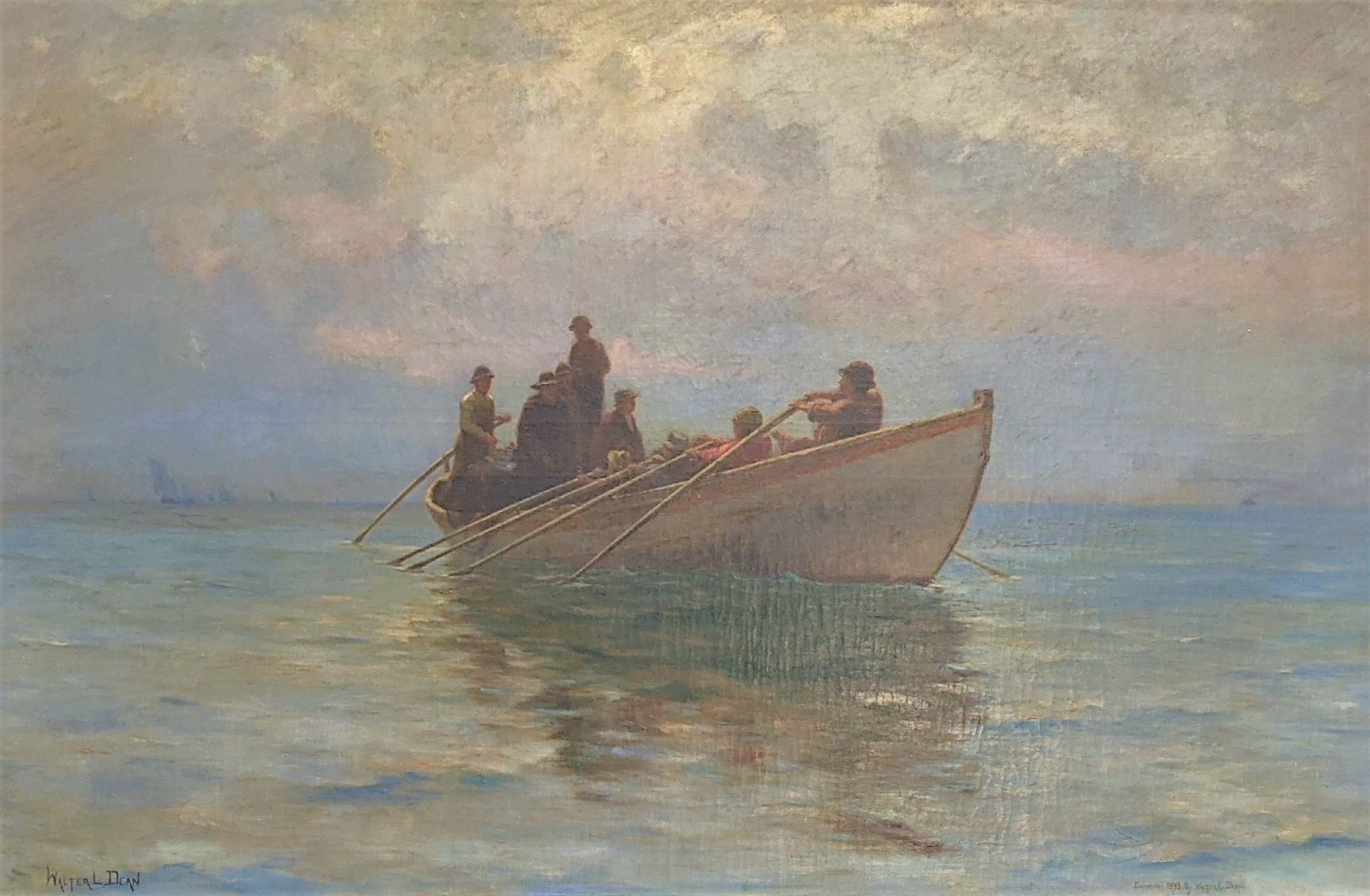
The Seiners Return, 1892

Dean was proficient in painting fisherman and the sea. With two paintings he was able to capture fisherman both going out to their vessels with nets and returning back to port. The “Gloucester Seiners”, while about half the size of “The Seiners’ Return” is still 30 inches by 44 inches and was exhibited at the Boston Art Club in 1889, where it was described as “fresh, clear and airy”.

It was noted in the New England Magazine in 1893 that "of the paintings presented at the Chicago World’s Fair, it is noted that "The Seiners' Return" affords the most satisfactory idea of Dean’s abilities and tendencies. It is pitched in a pleasant, clear, high key of color, has plenty of atmosphere and space, is animated and full of movement. Mr. Dean is a very clever marine painter, and is thoroughly familiar with all the details of this special province of art, in which American painters have won so many laurels."

It was later noted in the Boston Sunday Journal in 1895 that “The Seiners’ Return, a canvas four feet high and six feet long and shows the artist’s talent in figure painting, though in a less degree than his “Market Boat at Capri” which has 18 large men, women and children in the foreground. This painting represents the return of fishermen to their vessels. They are in their tender, with their nets aboard. It is in the late afternoon, there is an evening glow in the sky, and the picture has a good deal of color and feeling." It is a companion piece to the Gloucester Seiners 1888 which represents the start to the nets. The Seiners' Return was exhibited in 1892 at the 67th exhibition of the National Academy of Design, then in the 18th triennial Exhibition of the Massachusetts Charitable Mechanic Association, Boston, October and November 1892, and again in 1893 at the Chicago World’s Fair.

== Selected works ==
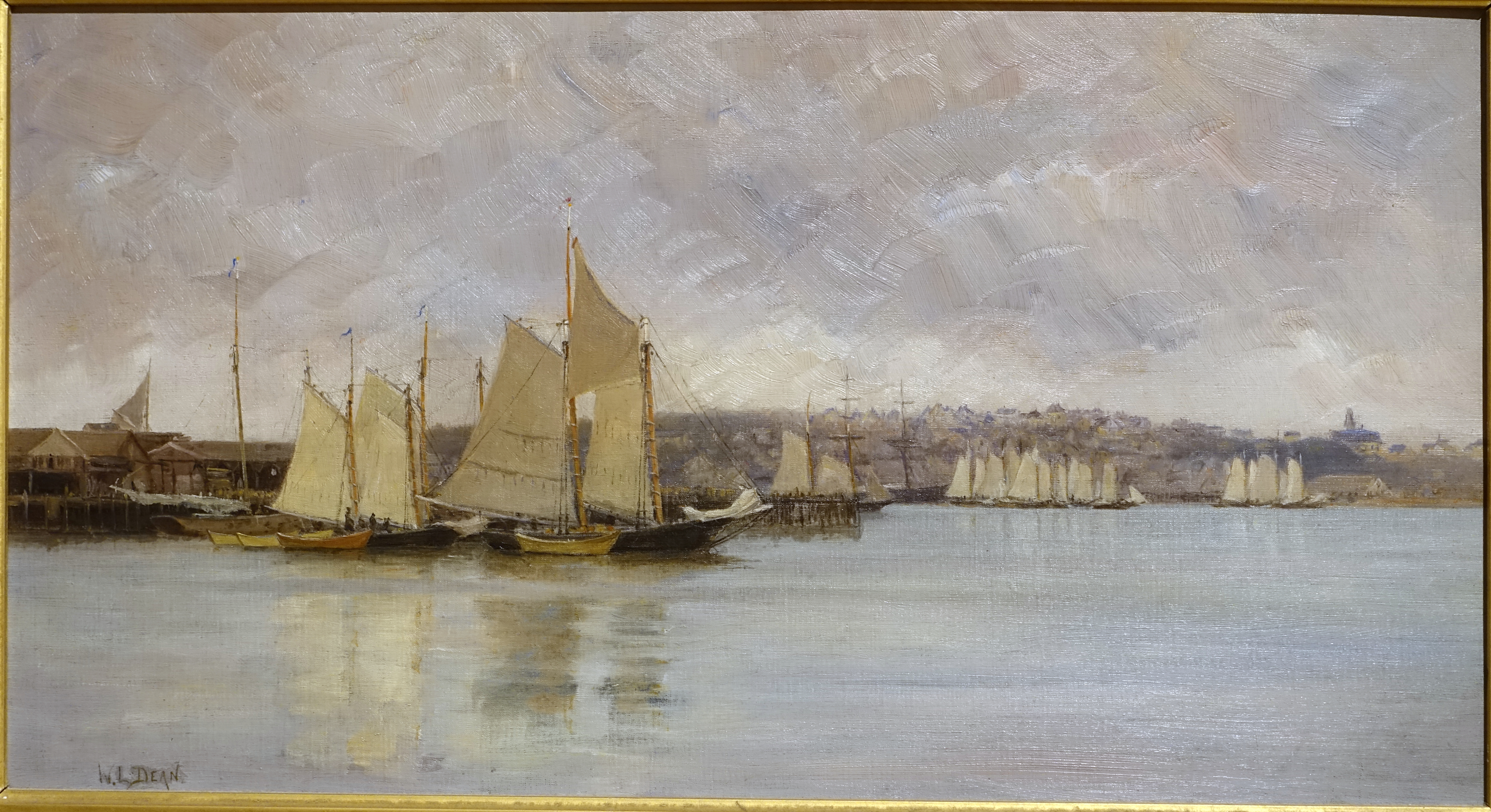
View of Gloucester Harbor, ca1890

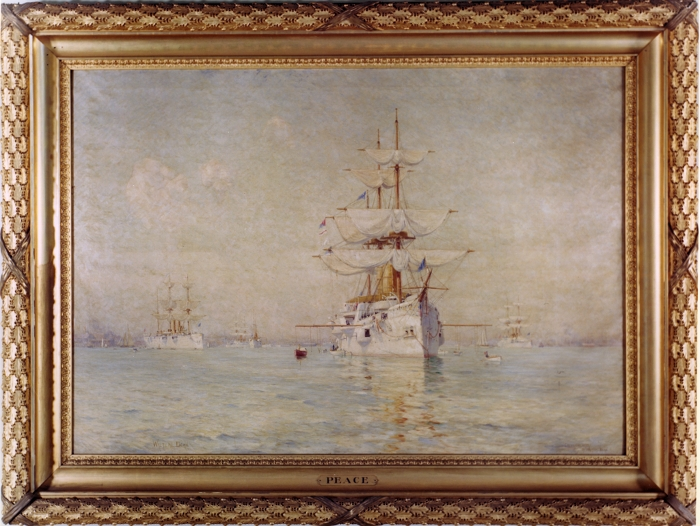
Peace, 1891

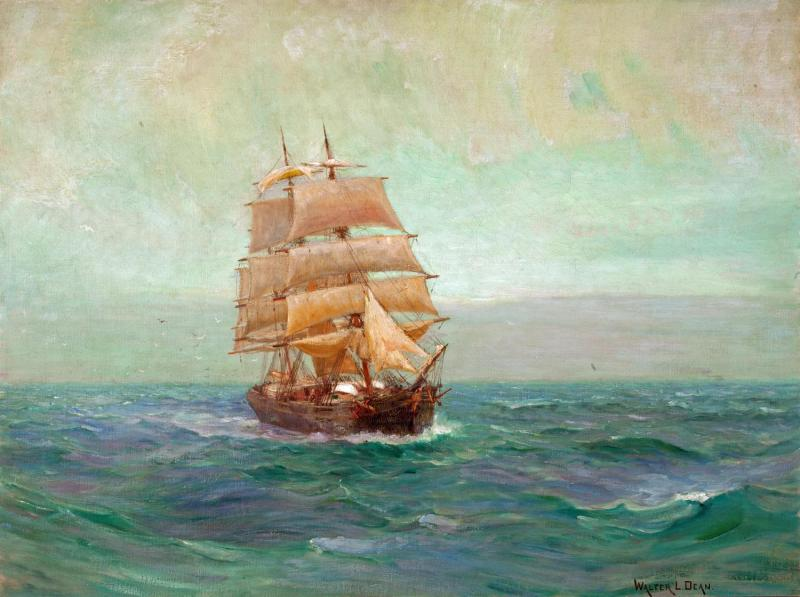
Fog Off Gloucester, ca 1906

- Yacht Tempest (1881) Whistler House Museum of Art
- The Sardine Fleet, Concarneau (1882) exhibited at William & Everett Gallery, 1883
- A Summer Day on the Dutch Shore (1883) exhibited at Poland Spring Gallery, 1898
- On Dutch Sands (ca 1883) Sotheby's New York, 1980
- At the Fountain, Capri (ca 1884) Massachusetts Charitable Mechanic Association, 1884
- Market Boat. Capri (ca 1884) Massachusetts Charitable Mechanic Association, 1884
- North Sea Fisherman off a Lee Shore (ca 1885) Whistler House Museum of Art
- North Sea Fishermen Racing Home (ca 1888) Massachusetts Charitable Mechanic Association, 1890
- The Gloucester Seiners (1888) exhibited at Boston Art Club, 1889
- View of Gloucester Harbor (ca 1890) Cape Ann Museum
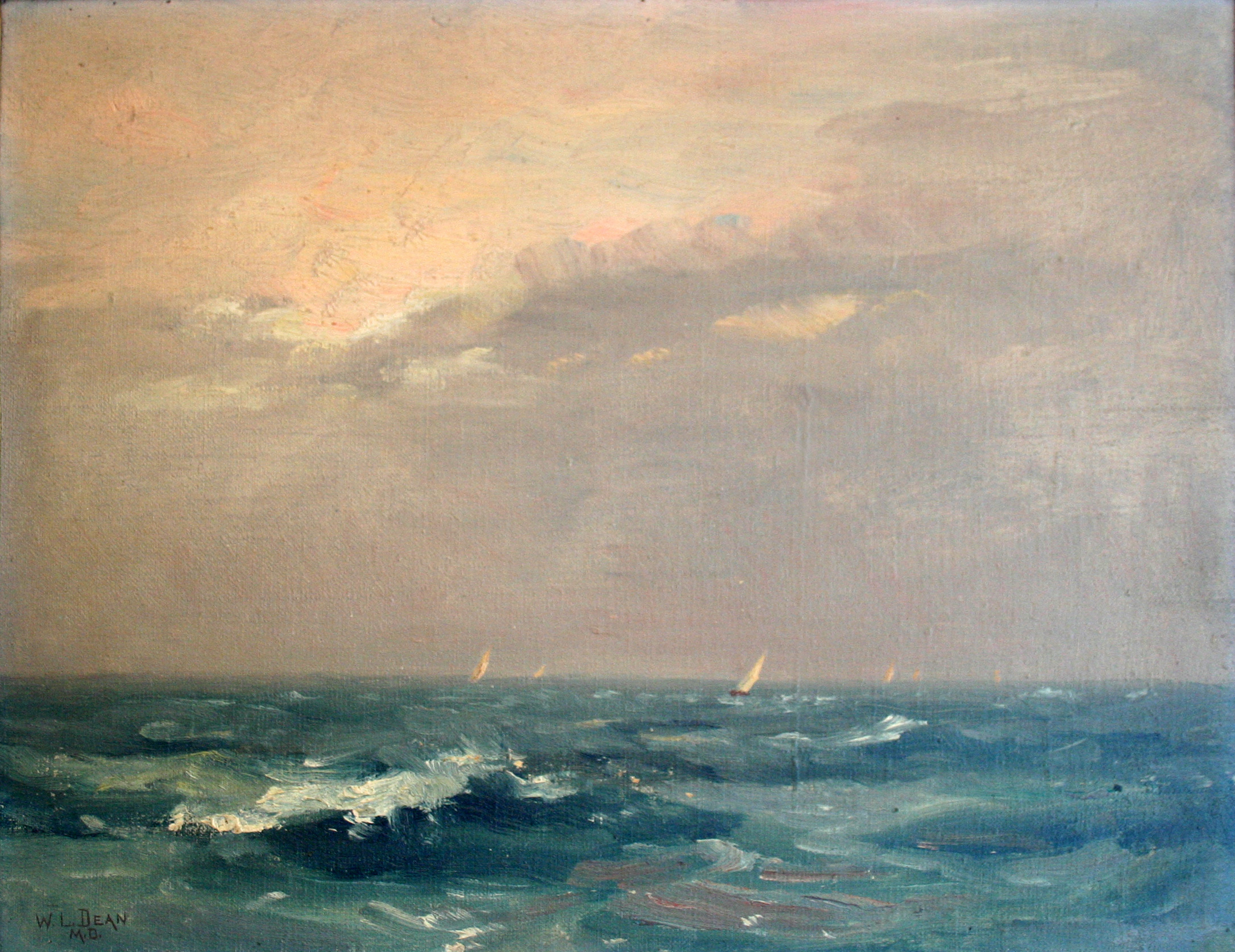
- Looking SW, July 7, 1910
  Open Sea (1890) exhibited at Chicago World's Fair, 1893
- Peace (1891) Cannon House Office Building
- The Seiners Return (1892) exhibited at Chicago World's Fair, 1893
- A Fine Catch (1893) Whistler House Museum of Art
- Naval Review New York (1893) Whistler House Museum of Art
- US Fleet at Hampton Roads (1893) Whistler House Museum of Art
- An October Catch (1894) exhibited at the Boston Art Club, 1894
- Well Rewarded (1894) exhibited at American Water Color Society, Philadelphia Museum of Art, 1894
- Ton Catcher, Bay of Biscay (1895) exhibited at American Water Color Society, Philadelphia Museum of Art, 1895
- Bay of Naples (1896) exhibited at American Water Color Society, Philadelphia Museum of Art, 1896
- U.S.S. Enterprise (ca 1896) exhibited at Paint and Clay Club, 1896
- U.S.S Gunboat Gloucester, at Santiago (1898) exhibited at Worcester Art Club, 1905
- Moonrise (1900) exhibited at Pittsburgh International Exhibition, 1900
- On the Deep Sea (1901) Farnsworth Art Museum
- Ballast Haulers (ca 1903), Bronze Medal at the 1904 Saint Louis Exposition, STOLEN from Lowell General Hospital, 1972
- Gloucester Harbor (1906) Sheldon Museum of Art
- Fog Off Gloucester (ca 1906) New Britain Museum of American Art
- Harbor Cove (1908), exhibited at Boston Art Club, 1908
