= Thomas B. Lawson =

American painter

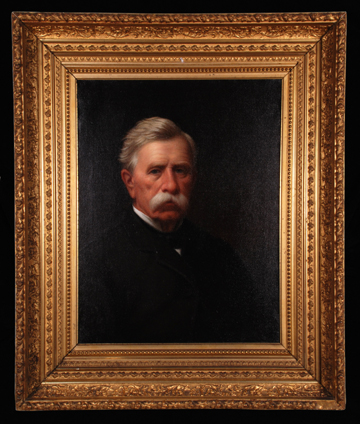
- Born: January 13, 1807
- Died: 1888

Thomas Bayley Lawson (January 13, 1807 – 1888) was an American artist and well-known portrait painter. Lawson was also the founder and first president of the Lowell Art Association and Whistler House Museum of Art.

== Early life and education ==
Thomas was born in Newburyport, Massachusetts on January 13, 1807 to father William Lawson and mother Frances Lawson. He worked his way up in the dry goods industry, first as a clerk, then up to having his own store at the age of 21. Also having a passion for painting, he began to teach himself the art by copying famous works of other artists. By his 23rd birthday, he was accepted to the National Academy of Design in New York City where he trained for a half year in the art of drawing, and then went on to Philadelphia in the Spring of 1832 for another six months. After a year of formal training, Thomas returned to Newburyport to open his own studio, where he remained as a portrait painter for the next decade.

On December 17, 1838 he married Catherine, daughter of Nathan Follansbee of Newburyport.

== Lowell years ==
In 1842, Thomas Lawson relocated his family to Lowell, Massachusetts, where he quickly became one of the prominent portrait painters. He painted many social elites, such as; John Avery, George Brownell, Jane A Lock, Judge John Look, Rev. Miles, John Nesmith.

In 1844, he was commissioned to travel to Washington, D.C. and paint Daniel Webster who was acting Secretary of State at the time. Secretary Webster sat a dozen times for Thomas to complete the work, but it was well worth the effort. Thomas was commissioned to replicate the painting over twenty times, and according to Fredrick W. Colburn, Daniel Webster complimented the painting for its uncanny likeness by saying; "That is the face I shave."

During the American Civil War, Lawson shifted his talent to painting more still lives, especially grapes and fruits. All in all, he painted some 30 still lives.

In 1878, Lawson was instrumental in creating Lowell Art Association, as founder and first president, which is the organization that is responsible for the preservation of the birthplace of James Whistler and the creation of the Whistler House Museum of Art.

Having not forgotten his roots, Thomas also donated to the improvement and development of the Newburyport Public Library. In 1883 he donated one of his Daniel Webster portraits, and in 1884 he donated the portrait of Caleb Cushing.

Thomas Lawson died June 4, 1888, at the age of 81. His son, Walter U. Lawson later married Elizabeth Lennon of New York City, on April 25, 1900. His oldest daughter, Frances Ellen Lawson first married Nicholas Biddle Uhler of Philadelphia, and later Frank Skinner of Woodbury, New Jersey. His Youngest daughter, Lilla Lawson married Fredrick Grant of Boston.

== Famous works ==
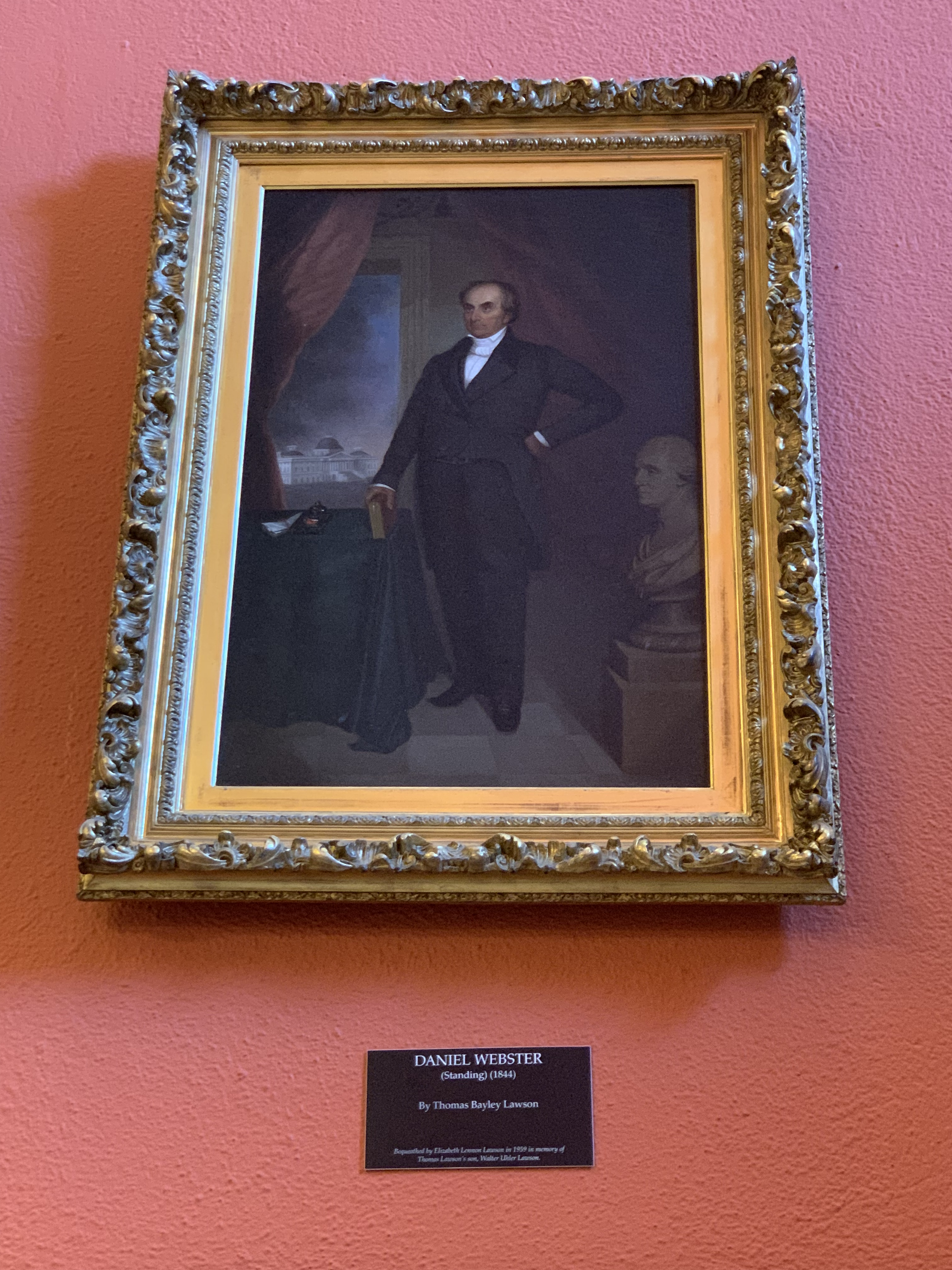
- Portrait of Daniel Webster (1844) now in the Pollard Memorial Library, Lowell, MA.
  Portrait of "Daniel Webster"
- "Hanging Grapes" (displayed at the Whistler House Museum of Art)
- Portrait of "Jeremiah Nelson"
- Portrait of "Caleb Cushing"
