= De Morgan Medal =

Prize in mathematics

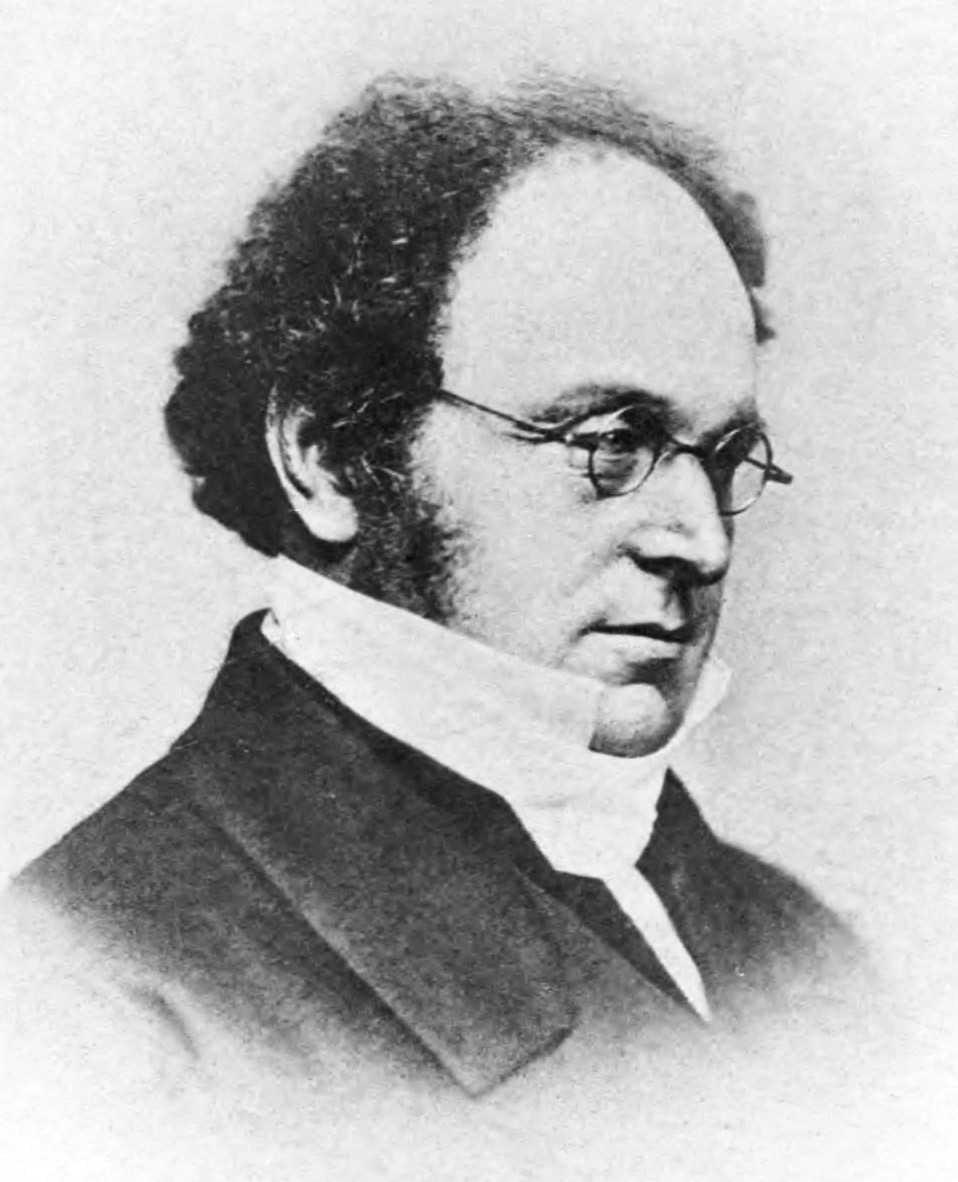
Augustus De Morgan

The De Morgan Medal is a prize for outstanding contribution to mathematics, awarded by the London Mathematical Society. The Society's most prestigious award, it is given in memory of Augustus De Morgan, who was the first President of the society. It is awarded every three years, usually to a mathematician living and working in the United Kingdom.

In 1968, Mary Cartwright became the first woman to receive the award.

== De Morgan Medal winners ==
Recipients of the De Morgan Medal include the following:

- 1884 Arthur Cayley
- 1887 James Joseph Sylvester
- 1890 Lord Rayleigh
- 1893 Felix Klein
- 1896 S. Roberts
- 1899 William Burnside
- 1902 A. G. Greenhill
- 1905 H. F. Baker
- 1908 J. W. L. Glaisher
- 1911 Horace Lamb
- 1914 J. Larmor
- 1917 W. H. Young
- 1920 E. W. Hobson
- 1923 P. A. MacMahon
- 1926 A. E. H. Love
- 1929 G. H. Hardy
- 1932 Bertrand Russell
- 1935 E. T. Whittaker
- 1938 J. E. Littlewood
- 1941 Louis Mordell
- 1944 Sydney Chapman
- 1947 George Neville Watson
- 1950 A. S. Besicovitch
- 1953 E. C. Titchmarsh
- 1956 G. I. Taylor
- 1959 W. V. D. Hodge
- 1962 Max Newman
- 1965 Philip Hall
- 1968 Mary Cartwright
- 1971 Kurt Mahler
- 1974 Graham Higman
- 1977 C. Ambrose Rogers
- 1980 Michael Atiyah
- 1983 K. F. Roth
- 1986 J. W. S. Cassels
- 1989 D. G. Kendall
- 1992 Albrecht Fröhlich
- 1995 W. K. Hayman
- 1998 R. A. Rankin
- 2001 J. A. Green
- 2004 Roger Penrose
- 2007 Bryan John Birch
- 2010 Keith William Morton
- 2013 John Griggs Thompson
- 2016 Timothy Gowers
- 2019 Andrew Wiles
- 2022 John M. Ball
- 2025 Nigel Hitchin

== See also ==
- Whitehead Prize
- Fröhlich Prize
- Senior Whitehead Prize
- Berwick Prize
- Naylor Prize and Lectureship
- Pólya Prize (LMS)
- List of mathematics awards
