= William Morton =

William Morton may refer to:

== Law and politics ==
- William Morton (MP for Leicester) (fl. 1386–1388), MP for Leicester
- William Morton (MP for Berwick-upon-Tweed) (fl. 1584–1593), MP for Berwick-upon-Tweed
- William Morton (judge) (1605–1672), English judge and MP
- William Morton (American politician) (fl. 1886–1888), mayor of Lancaster, Pennsylvania
- William Morton (Manitoba politician) (1884–1958), Canadian politician
- William Dix Morton Jr. (1904–1970), member of the Massachusetts House of Representatives

== Sports ==
- Bill Morton (footballer, born 1877) (William Morton. 1877-?), English footballer, see List of Bury F.C. players (1–24 appearances)
- William Morton (cyclist) (1880–1952), Canadian cyclist
- Bill Morton (American football) (1909–1987), American college football player and American Express executive
- William Morton (boxer), American boxer, see Boxing at the 1955 Pan American Games
- William Morton (cricketer) (1961–2019), Scottish cricketer
- William Morton (footballer), English footballer
- William Morton (rugby union), Irish international rugby union player

== Others ==
- W. L. Morton (1908–1980), Canadian historian
- William T. G. Morton (1819–1868), American dentist, the first to publicly use ether anesthesia
- William Morton (tenor) (1912–1995), Canadian opera singer
- William H. Morton (1877–1947), British locomotive engineer and general manager of the Great Southern Railways of Ireland
- William J. Morton (1845–1920), American physician
- William Morton (priest) (born 1956), Dean of Derry
- William Morton (theatre manager) (1839–1939), amusement caterer and theatre and cinema manager in England

== See also ==
- Bill Morton (disambiguation)
- Billy Morton, American burglar and underworld figure, also known as Billy Porter
- William Moreton (1641–1715), Anglican bishop in Ireland
- William Moreton (judge) (c. 1696 – 1763), English judge
