= Benjamin Dean =

American politician

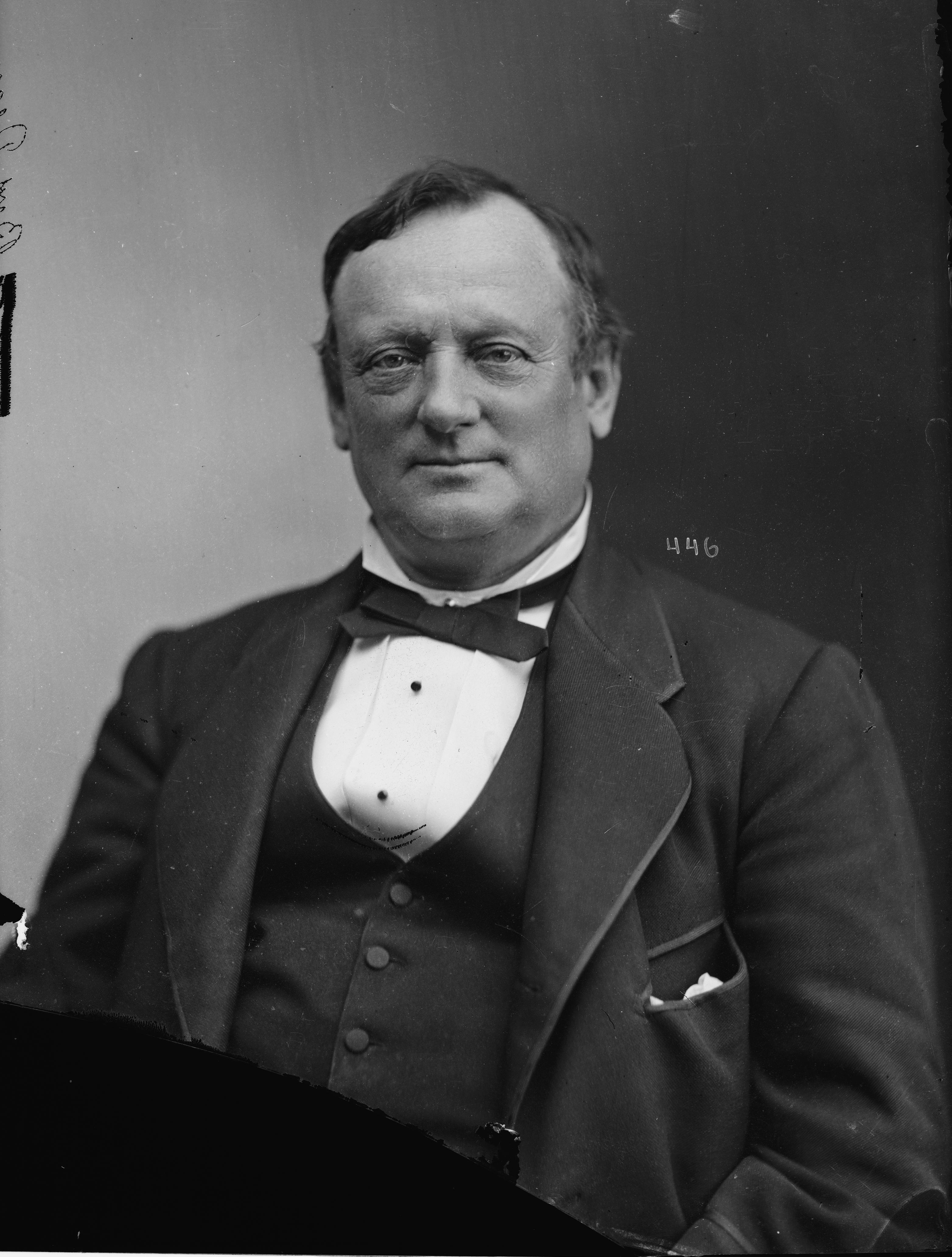

Member of the U.S. House of Representatives from Massachusetts's 3rd district
- In office March 28, 1878 – March 3, 1879
- Preceded by: Walbridge A. Field
- Succeeded by: Walbridge A. Field

Member of the Massachusetts Senate
- In office 1862-1863; 1869

Personal details
- Born: August 14, 1824 Clitheroe, Lancashire, England, U.K.
- Died: April 9, 1897 (aged 72) South Boston, Massachusetts, U.S.
- Party: Democratic
- Education: Dartmouth College
- Profession: Lawyer
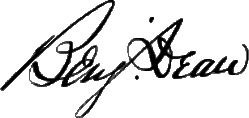
- Signature

Benjamin Dean (August 14, 1824 – April 9, 1897) was a member of the U.S. House of Representatives from Massachusetts.

== Early life ==
Born in Clitheroe, Lancashire, England, U.K., fifth child of Alice Lofthouse and Benjamin Dean, he moved with his family to America at the age of five, and grew up in Lowell, Massachusetts.

He attended Lowell schools and Dartmouth College. In 1845 he was admitted to the bar, and founded the Lowell firm of Dean & Dinsmoor, Attorneys. Dean continued his practice after moving to Boston in 1852.

== Public service ==
Dean served in the Massachusetts Senate and on the Common Council of the City of Boston. In the Massachusetts Senate he was one of two votes against the 14th Amendment in 1869. Dean was elected as a Democrat to the 45th United States Congress, serving from 1878 to 1879. Dean was not a candidate for reëlection in 1878. Thereafter he resumed his law practice in Boston, and was chairman of the board of parks commissioners in his later years.

== Personal life ==
Dean was married to Mary Anne French, daughter of Lowell Mayor Josiah Bowers French and a descendant of the Cotton and Mather families of Massachusetts Bay. They had six children, including marine artist Walter Lofthouse Dean and Judge Josiah French Dean.

A 33-degree Mason, he served as grand master of the Grand Commandery of the United States from 1880 to 1883; and attended the Tricentennial Conclave in San Francisco in 1883 with his wife and youngest daughter, Mary.

He was a member of the Boston Yacht Club and owned Outer Brewster Island. Dean died at his home in South Boston on April 9, 1897, and is buried at Lowell Cemetery.

== See also ==
- 84th Massachusetts General Court (1863)
- 90th Massachusetts General Court (1869)

U.S. House of Representatives
Preceded by Walbridge A. Field	Member of the U.S. House of Representatives from Massachusetts's 3rd congressional district March 28, 1878 – March 3, 1879	Succeeded by Walbridge A. Field
