= Judge Morton =

Judge Morton may refer to:

- James Madison Morton Jr. (1869–1940), judge of the United States Court of Appeals for the First Circuit
- Leland Clure Morton (1916–1998), judge of the United States District Court for the Middle District of Tennessee

== See also ==
- Justice Morton (disambiguation)
