= Alexander Morton (disambiguation) =

Alexander Morton (1945–2026) was a Scottish actor.

Alexander Morton may also refer to:

- Alec Morton (Alexander Morton, 1884-1971), Scottish footballer, see List of Bury F.C. players (1–24 appearances)
- Alexander Morton (manufacturer) (1844–1923), Scottish textiles manager
- Alexander Morton (naturalist) (1854–1907), American-born Australian museum director and naturalist
- Alex Morton (cylist) (born 2001), American cyclist and motor racer, see Pan American Cyclo-cross Championships

== See also ==
- Alexander Morten (1831–1900), English footballer
- Alexander Mathie-Morton (1880–1965), Scottish cricketer and solicitor
- Alexandra Morton (born 1957), American and Canadian marine biologist
