= Robert Morton =

Robert or Bob Morton may refer to:

- Robert Morton Organ Company, a pipe organ manufacturer in the U.S.

== People ==
- Robert Morton (MP), in 1361, MP for Nottinghamshire
- Robert Morton (died 1424), MP for Nottinghamshire
- Robert Morton (bishop) (1435–1497), Bishop of Worcester
- Robert Morton (composer) (1430–1479), English composer of early Renaissance music
- Bob Morton (Australian footballer) (1944–1995), Australian rules footballer for St Kilda
- Bob Morton (footballer, born 1906) (1906–1990), English football player for several clubs
- Bob Morton (footballer, born 1927) (1927–2002), English football player for Luton Town
- Bob Morton (Scottish footballer) (1891–1948), Scottish footballer
- Bob Morton (naturist), American naturist
- Robert Morton (producer), American television producer known for his work on Late Night with David Letterman
- Bob Morton (politician) (1934–2015), State Senator from Washington state, USA
- Robert W. Morton (1937–2002), Royal Canadian Air Force officer
- Robert Morton (biochemist) (1920–1963), Australian biochemist

== Characters ==
- Dr. Robert Morton, a character on the 1960s U.S. show Peyton Place (TV series)
- Bob Morton, an OCP executive in the 1987 film RoboCop

== See also ==
- Robert Moreton (1922–1957), English comedian
