= Ambrose Ranney =

American politician (1821–1899)

Ambrose Arnold Ranney
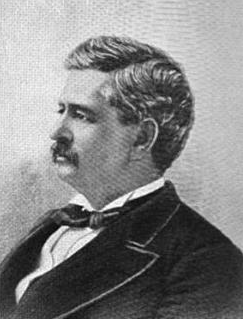

Member of the U.S. House of Representatives from Massachusetts's 3rd district
- In office March 4, 1881 – March 3, 1887
- Preceded by: Walbridge A. Field
- Succeeded by: Leopold Morse

Member of the Massachusetts House of Representatives
- In office 1857; 1863-1864

Personal details
- Born: April 17, 1821 Townshend, Vermont, U.S.
- Died: March 5, 1899 (aged 77) Boston, Massachusetts, U.S.
- Resting place: Forest Hills Cemetery; Boston, Massachusetts, U.S.
- Party: Republican
- Education: Dartmouth College
- Profession: Lawyer

Ambrose Arnold Ranney (April 17, 1821 – March 5, 1899) was a Representative from Massachusetts.

== Early life ==
Ambrose Arnold Ranney was born in Townshend, Vermont on April 17, 1821, a son of Waitstill R. Ranney and Phebe (Atwood) Ranney. He graduated from Dartmouth College and studied law in Woodstock, Vermont in 1844. In 1848, he was admitted to the bar and practiced in Boston.

== Career ==
Ranney was in the corporation counsel for the city from 1855 to 1857. He was a member of the Massachusetts House of Representatives in 1857, 1863, and 1864 and served as a Republican in the Forty-seventh, Forty-eighth, and Forty-ninth Congresses (1881–1887). Ranney supported women’s suffrage. He failed reelection in 1886 to the Fiftieth Congress. He then resumed the practice of law until his death.

== Personal life ==
Ranney died in Boston on March 5, 1899. Ranney was buried at Forest Hills Cemetery in Boston.

U.S. House of Representatives
Preceded by Walbridge A. Field	Member of the U.S. House of Representatives from Massachusetts's 3rd congressional district March 4, 1881 - March 3, 1887	Succeeded by Leopold Morse
