= Alan Morton (disambiguation) =

Alan Morton (1893–1971) was a Scottish international footballer of the 1920s and 1930s.

Alan Morton may also refer to:

- Alan Morton (footballer, born 1942) (1942–2021), English footballer (Peterborough United, Lincoln City and Chesterfield FC)
- Alan Morton (footballer, born 1950), English footballer (Stockport County, Fulham FC and Wimbledon FC)
- Alan Morton (rugby union) (1934–2026), Australian rugby union player and academic
