= James Madison Morton Sr. =

American judge (1837–1923)

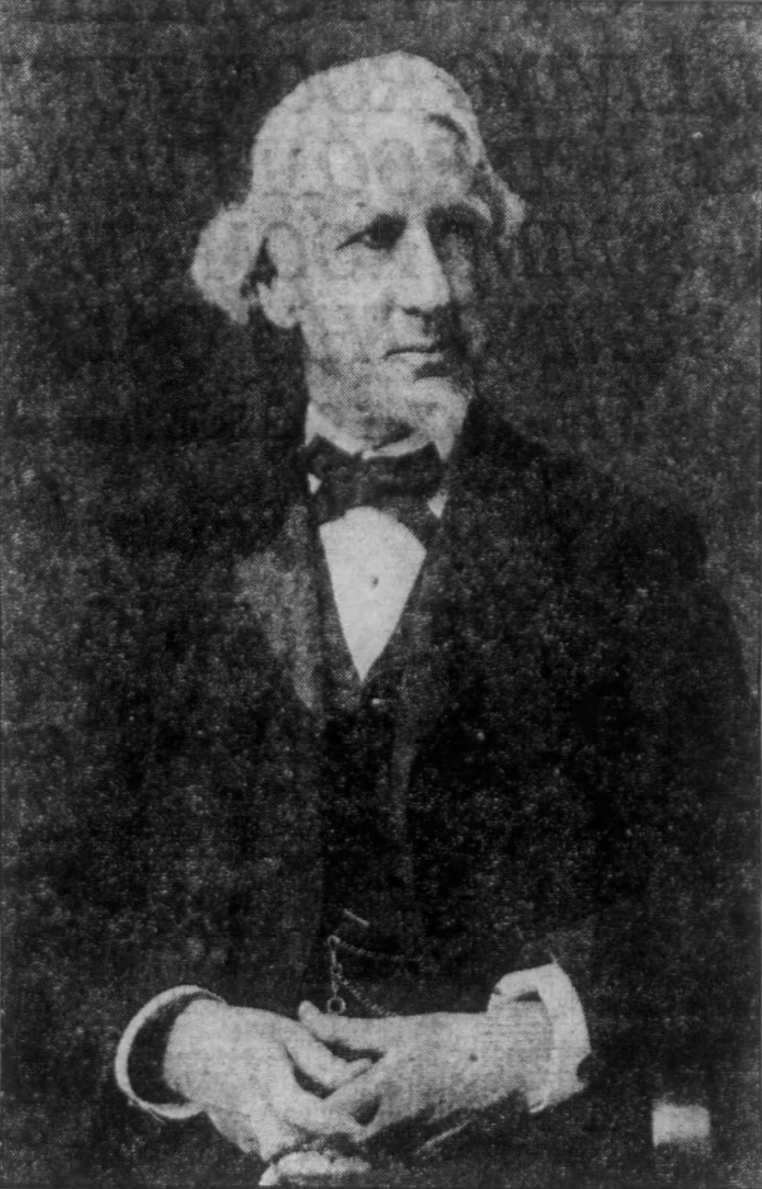
Justice James Madison Morton

James Madison Morton Sr. (September 5, 1837 – April 19, 1923) was a justice of the Massachusetts Supreme Judicial Court from 1890 to 1913. He was appointed by Governor John Q. A. Brackett.

== Biography ==
Born in Fairhaven, Massachusetts, Morton received an undergraduate degree from Brown University in 1859, where he was classmates with John Hay and William Williams Keen, followed by an LL.B. from Harvard Law School in 1861. He entered private practice in Boston, and was city solicitor of that city from 1864 to 1867. He remained in practice until 1890, when Governor John Q. A. Brackett appointed Morton to the Massachusetts Supreme Judicial Court. Morton served for 23 years, submitting his resignation in 1913.

== Personal life and death ==
On November 6, 1866, Morton married Emily Frances Canedy, with whom he had three children. Morton's son, James Madison Morton Jr., became a long-serving United States federal judge.

Morton died at his home in Boston at the age of 86.

Political offices
| Preceded by Marcus Morton | Justice of the Massachusetts Supreme Judicial Court; 1890–1913 | Succeeded by John Crawford Crosby |
