= Whistler House Museum of Art =

Museum in Lowell, Massachusetts

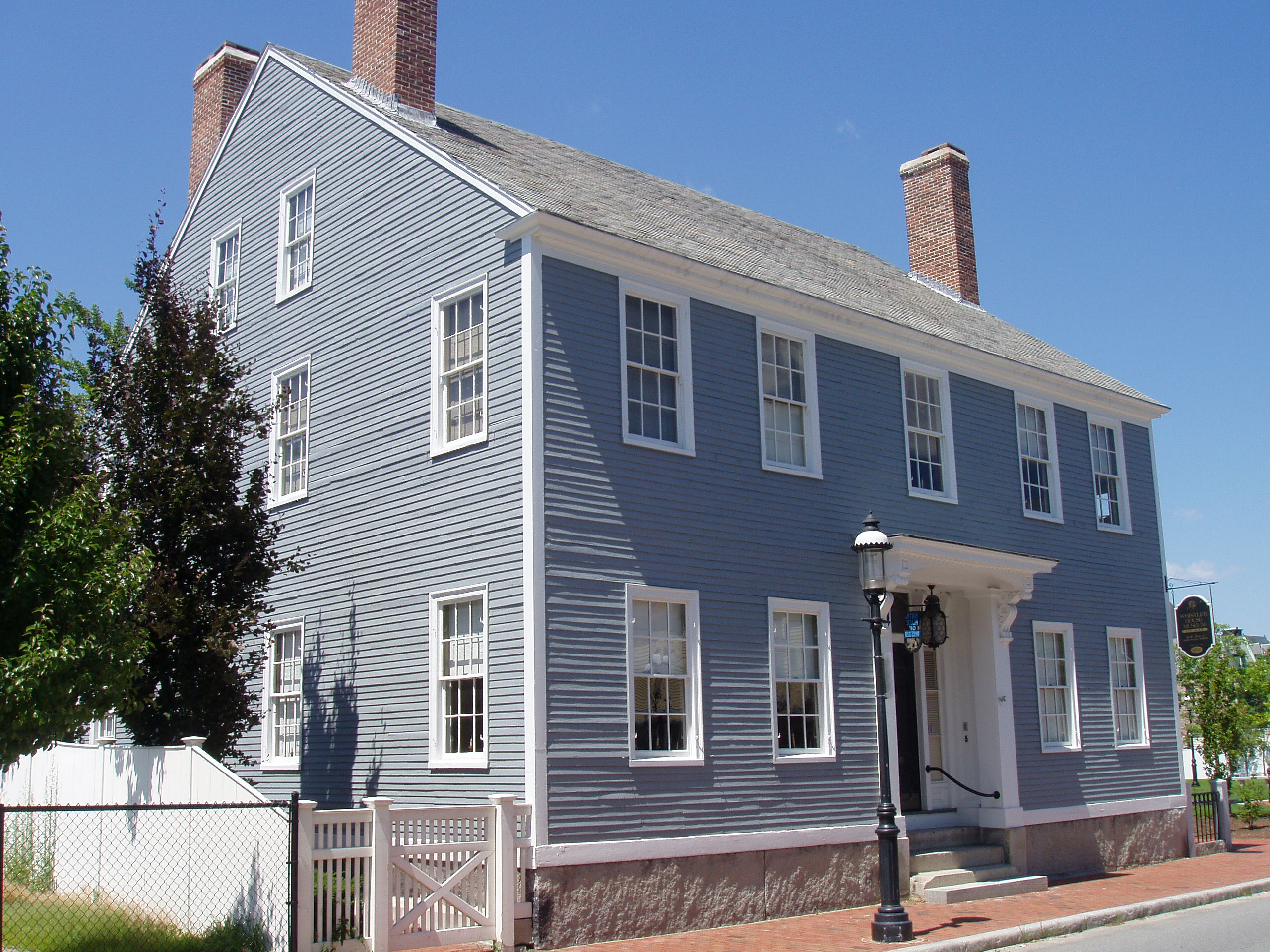
- The Whistler House Museum of Art, birthplace of James McNeill Whistler.

- Location within Massachusetts Location within the United States
- Location: 243 Worthen Street, Lowell, Massachusetts, USA
- Coordinates: 42°38′40.13″N 71°18′52.97″W
- Website: www.whistlerhouse.org

The Whistler House Museum of Art is the birthplace of painter and etcher James McNeill Whistler. It is located at 243 Worthen Street, Lowell, Massachusetts, USA, and is open as a museum displaying works from the museum collection and shows by artist members.

== History of the house ==
The house was built in 1823 by the Locks and Canals Company for their manager. Paul Moody, master mechanic and inventor, was the first resident of the house. Upon becoming Chief Engineer in 1834, George Washington Whistler lived in the house with his wife, Anna Matilda McNeill Whistler. Their son James Whistler was born in 1834 there. James B. Francis took over as chief engineer and moved into the house in 1837 when G.W. Whistler moved to Russia. James Francis married Sarah, and they raised their six children here.

In 1907, the home was purchased by the Lowell Art Association, Inc., and opened in 1908 as a museum.

== Permanent exhibit ==
The first floor and second floor hall and bedrooms now house the WHMA's Permanent collection, including one room dedicated to the etchings of James McNeil Whistler. The top floor is a working artist studio. In the rear of the home is the Parker Gallery, where new exhibits are shown. The museum is open everyday from 11:00 a.m. to 4:00 p.m.

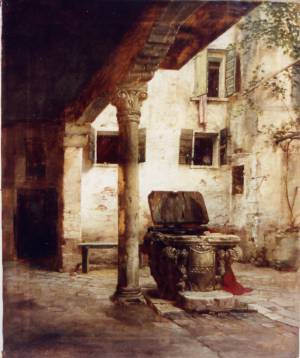
The Courtyard of Titian's House in Venice, 1880
- David Dalhoff Neal oil on canvas
- Thomas B. Lawson Hanging Grapes oil on canvas

== See also ==
- List of historic houses in Massachusetts
- List of paintings by James McNeill Whistler
- List of single-artist museums
