= David Morton =

David Morton may refer to:

- David Morton (poet) (1886–1957), American poet
- David Morton (rugby union) (1861–1937), Scottish rugby union player
- David Bruce Morton (born 1959), American serial killer and rapist
- Dave Morton (born 1953), English motorcycle speedway rider
