= Bob Morton (naturist) =

American naturism activist

Robert Morton
- Occupation: Electrical engineer
- Years active: 1997-2017
- Title: Executive Director
- Movement: Naturism
- Board member of: Naturist Action Committee

Bob Morton is an electrical engineer and former Chairman/Executive Director of the Naturist Action Committee, an organization dedicated to defending the civil rights of the naturist community.

As editor of publisher who published one of the first club newsletters for the Hill Country Nudists, in addition to writing about everyday club events, Morton also discussed serious issues regarding the nudist movement and also instituted the policy of printing the full names of members in the newsletter, an unusual practice in the days when the editors of nudist publications were not allowed to use last names of club members.

Morton and his family were plaintiffs in a NAC-supported lawsuit to return the rights of parents who wish to bring their children with them to Hippie Hollow, a clothing-optional public park near Austin, Texas. Morton has also testified before various state legislative committees on behalf of naturists, and was chairman of NAC from 1997 to 2017. Before joining the board, he was an NAC area representative. In addition to watching out for naturists' interests in all 50 states of the U.S., he currently watches for anti-nudity legislation in all 254 counties in Texas since that state voted for home rule, with the result that any county in Texas can enact its own anti-nudist ordinances and laws.

== See also ==
- The Naturist Society
