= Philip Morton =

Philip Morton may refer to:

- Philip Morton (cricketer) (1857–1925), English cricketer and schoolmaster
- Philip Morton (politician) (1862–1932), Australian politician
- Phil Morton (1945–2003), American video artist and activist
- Pat Morton (Philip Henry Morton, 1910–1999), Australian businessman and politician
