= Bill Morton =

Bill Morton may refer to:

- Bill Morton (SQA), former chief executive of the Scottish Qualifications Authority
- Bill Morton (racing driver), former NASCAR Cup Series driver in 1965 Virginia 500
- Bill Morton (American football) (1909–1987), American college football player and American Express executive
- Billy Morton, alias of Billy Porter (criminal) (1850–unknown), American burglar and underworld figure

== See also ==
- William Morton (disambiguation)
