= Keith William Morton =

British mathematician

Keith William Morton (born 28 May 1930, Ipswich, Suffolk, England) is a British mathematician working on partial differential equations, and their numerical analysis.

He obtained his Ph.D. in 1964 under the supervision of Harold Grad at the Courant Institute of Mathematical Sciences of New York University.

In 2010, he was awarded the De Morgan Medal.
