= Richard Morton =

Richard Morton may refer to:

- Richard Alan Morton (1899–1977), British biochemist
- Richard Lee Morton (1889–1974), American historian and professor
- Richard Morton (basketball) (born 1966), retired American professional basketball player and coach
- Richard Morton (physician) (1637–1698), English physician
- Ricky Morton (born 1956), American professional wrestler
