= Thomas Morton =

Thomas Morton may refer to:

- Thomas Morton (bishop) (1564–1659), Bishop of Durham and Chester in the 17th century
- Thomas Morton (playwright) (1764–1838), British playwright
- Thomas Morton (colonist) (c. 1579–1647), British lawyer & early colonist of Massachusetts
- Thomas Morton (journalist) (active 2014), American journalist
- Thomas Morton (shipwright) (1781–1832), inventor of the Patent slip
- Thomas Morton (surgeon) (1813–1849), English surgeon
- Thomas Corsan Morton (1859–1928), Scottish artist of the Glasgow School
- Thomas Lewis Morton (1846–1914), English-born farmer and politician in Manitoba, Canada
- Thomas Morton (priest) (1894-1968), catholic priest and writer
- Thomas Morton (MP for Gloucestershire), English Member of Parliament for Gloucestershire
- Thomas Morton (MP for Bishop's Lynn), 14th-century English Member of Parliament
- Tom Morton (born 1955), Scottish journalist, author and BBC Radio Scotland broadcaster
