= Harry Morton =

Harry Morton may refer to:

- Harry Morton (footballer) (1909–1974), English football goalkeeper for Aston Villa in the 1930s
- Harry Morton (restaurateur) (1981–2019), American restaurateur and founder of the restaurant chain Pink Taco
- Harry Kemp Morton (1905–1994), American lawyer and politician from New York
- Harry K. Morton (actor) (1889–1956), American vaudeville performer
- Bob Morton (politician) (1934–2015), full name Harry Robert Morton, American politician from Washington
- Harry Morton, fictional character, from The George Burns and Gracie Allen Show
