= William Dix Morton Jr. =

Massachusetts politician (1904–1970)

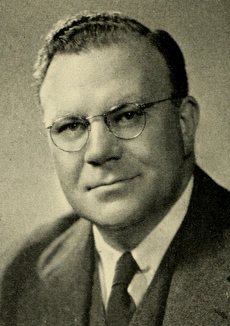
- Morton in 1953

Member of the Massachusetts House of Representatives from the 7th Norfolk district
- In office 1951–1962

Personal details
- Born: November 5, 1904 Owensboro, Kentucky, US
- Died: 1970 (aged 65–66) Wellesley, Massachusetts, US
- Education: Northeastern University; Harvard Law School

William Dix Morton Jr. (November 5, 1904– 1970) was an American politician who was the member of the Massachusetts House of Representatives from the 7th Norfolk district.
