= Alexander Mathie-Morton =

Scottish cricketer

Personal information
- Full name: Alexander Fullarton Mathie-Morton
- Born: 7 June 1880; Belmont, Ayrshire, Scotland
- Died: 16 January 1965 (aged 84); Ayr, Ayrshire, Scotland
- Batting: Right-handed

Domestic team information
- Years: Team
- 1922: Scotland

Career statistics
Competition	First-class
Matches	1
Runs scored	16
Batting average	8.00
100s/50s	–/–
Top score	9
Catches/stumpings	–/–
- Source: Cricinfo, 2 November 2022

Alexander Fullarton Mathie-Morton (7 June 1880 – 16 January 1965) was a Scottish first-class cricketer and solicitor.

The son of John Mathie-Morton and his wife, Jane, he was born in January 1887 at Belmont, Ayrshire. He was educated at Blair Lodge School. A club cricketer for Ayr, he made a single appearance in first-class cricket for Scotland against the Marylebone Cricket Club at Lord's in 1922. Batting twice in the match, he was dismissed in the Scotland first innings for 7 runs by Jack Russell, while following-on in their second innings he was dismissed for 9 runs by Richard Busk. By profession, Mathie-Morton was a solicitor and senior partner in the firm Messrs Mathie-Morton and Black. He died at Ayr in January 1965.
