= Paul Morton =

Paul Morton may refer to:

- Paul Morton (politician) (1857–1911), American businessman and politician
- PJ Morton (born 1981), American R&B singer, musician and producer
- Paul S. Morton (born 1950), American Baptist pastor
- Paul Morton (television executive) (1938–2024), Canadian television executive
- Paul Morton, vaudeville performer with The Four Mortons
