= Mary Morton Masters =

Northern Irish-New Zealand artist

- Born: Mary E. Morton; 1867; Northern Ireland
- Died: 8 August 1917 (aged 49–50); Ahipara
- Style: School of Fontainebleau
- Spouse: Charles Herbert Masters

Mary Morton Masters (née Morton, 1867-1917) was a New Zealand artist, who specialised in painting animals.

== Biography ==
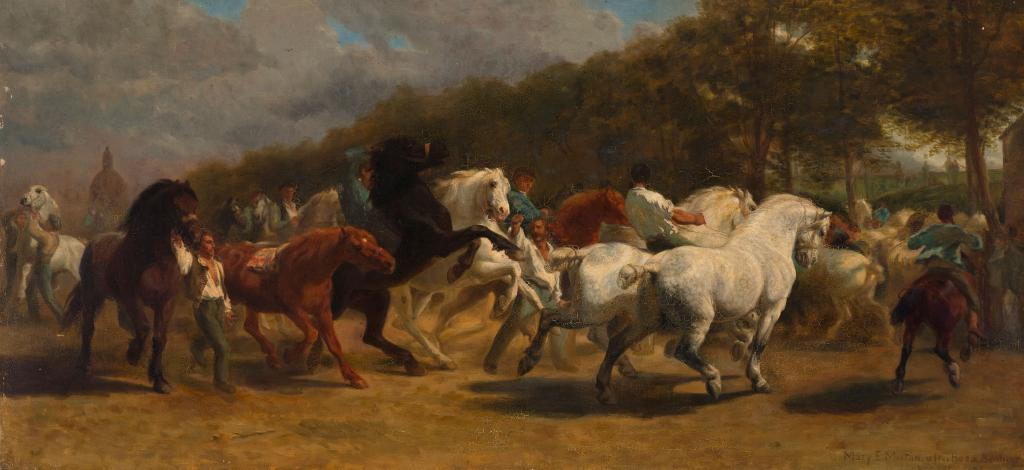
Mary Morton. 1899. The Horse Fair.

Mary E. Morton was born 1867 in Northern Ireland to Captain Berkeley Morton and Elizabeth Mary Grist. She moved with her family to New Zealand in 1878 on the Lady Jocelyn. They moved to Katikati, and her mother taught at the school there. Her father left Katikati in 1893 for Auckland.

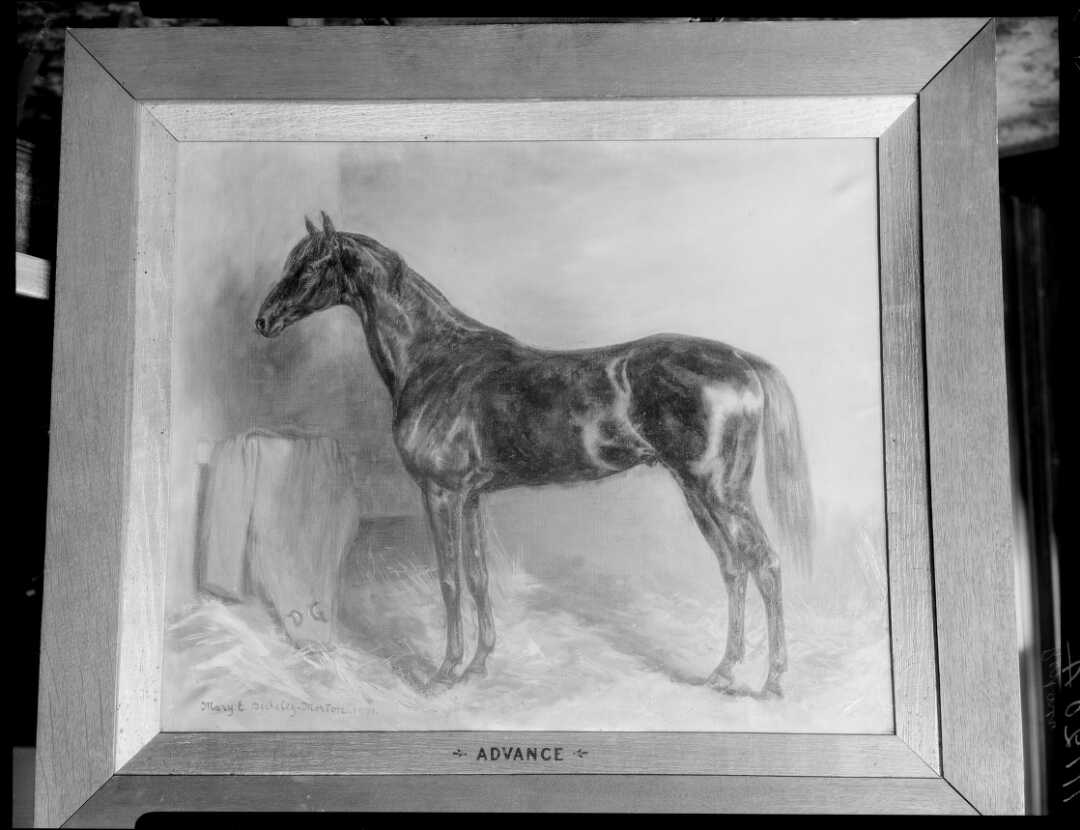
Mary Morton. 1901. Advance (Racehorse).

It is thought that in the years between 1893 and 1905, Mary Morton had formal art training in London. In 1905, Mary Morton married Charles Herbert Masters in Auckland. They lived in Ahipara on Masters' farm.

Morton Masters painted animals, and was commissioned to paint livestock, particularly horses. She was described as painting in the style of the Fontainebleau School. She exhibited in the Auckland Society of Arts from 1884 to 1904 as Mary E. Morton and, after her marriage, she exhibited with the society from 1905-1917 as Mary Morton Masters.

In 1907 and 1912, Morton Masters won all the prizes for animal painting at the New Zealand International Exhibition. During her lifetime, her artworks, Comrades and Toilers, were reproduced in New Zealand Graphic in 1899 and 1908.

She died in childbirth on 8 August 1917. Unfortunately, her paintings were kept in a separate farm building that was lost to a fire after her death. Some of her surviving artworks are in the Auckland Art Gallery and Te Ahu Museum, Kaitaia.
