= Andrew Morton =

Andrew Morton may refer to:

- Andrew Morton (computer programmer) (born 1959), Linux kernel programmer/coordinator
- Andrew Morton (painter) (1802–1845), English portrait artist
- Andrew Morton (writer) (born 1953), biographer of Diana, Princess of Wales, Angelina Jolie, Madonna, amongst others
- Andy Morton (1882–1950), Australian rugby league footballer for North Sydney Bears
- Andrew Morton (1812–1881), pioneering doctor and coroner of Weetangera, Australian Capital Territory

== See also ==
- Andrew Marton (1904–1992), Hungarian-American film director, producer and editor
