= Edward Morton =

Edward Morton may refer to:

- Edward Morton (author) (1858–1922), British author
- E. J. C. Morton (Edward John Chalmers Morton, 1856–1902), British barrister and Member of Parliament
- Eddie Morton (1870–1938), American vaudeville singer and comedian
