= Michael Morton =

Michael or Mike Morton may refer to:

- Michael Morton (running back) (born 1960), American football player (running back)
- Mike Morton (linebacker) (born 1972), American football player (linebacker) and NFL official
- Michael Morton (criminal justice) (born 1954), American man wrongfully convicted of murder
- Michael Morton (dramatist) (1864–1931), English playwright
- Michael Morton (restaurateur) (born 1964), co-founder of the N9NE Group
- Michael Morton (runner) (born 1971), American ultramarathoner
- Michael Morton (soccer) (born 1989), South African soccer player
- Mike Morton (geologist) (1924–2003), British petroleum geologist
- Michael Scott Morton (born 1937), British business theorist
- Michael Morton, Canadian musician who records under the name Displacer
