= Marcus Morton (judge) =

American judge

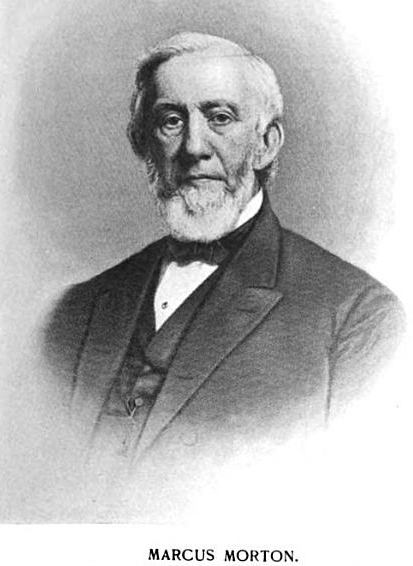

Associate Justice of the Massachusetts Supreme Judicial Court
- In office 1869–1882
- Preceded by: Ebenezer R. Hoar

Chief Justice of the Massachusetts Supreme Judicial Court
- In office 1882–1890
- Preceded by: Horace Gray
- Succeeded by: Walbridge A. Field

Personal details
- Born: April 8, 1819 Taunton, Massachusetts, U.S.
- Died: February 10, 1891 (aged 71) Andover, Massachusetts, U.S.
- Spouse: Abby B. Hoppin
- Children: Marcus Morton
- Parent(s): Marcus Morton and Charlotte Hodges
- Education: Brown University; Harvard Law School
- Profession: lawyer, jurist

Marcus Morton (April 8, 1819 – February 10, 1891), American lawyer and jurist who served as chief justice of the Massachusetts Supreme Judicial Court, was born in Taunton, the son of future Governor Marcus Morton and his wife Charlotte (née Hodges). He attended Bristol County Academy, was graduated from Brown University in 1838, and from Harvard Law School in 1840. After one year in the Boston office of Judge Peleg Sprague, he was admitted to the Suffolk bar in 1841 and practised in Boston for seventeen years. His first appearance in a public position was as a member of the Massachusetts Constitutional Convention of 1853, in which he sat for Andover, his home from 1850. In 1858 he served in the state House of Representatives, where he was chairman of the committee on elections and rendered reports on important questions regarding election law, which the House came to follow.

His judicial service began with his appointment in 1858 to the superior court of Suffolk County and continued unbroken for over thirty-two years. During these years he was one of the original ten members of the state superior court, organized in 1859; Justice of the Supreme Judicial Court of Massachusetts from April 15, 1869; and chief justice from January 16, 1882 to August 27, 1890, at which time he resigned because of ill health. He died of heart failure in Andover, leaving his widow, whom, as Abby B. Hoppin of Providence, Rhode Island, he had married on October 19, 1843, a son, and five daughters.

Morton was by temperament an excellent judge, thorough, strong and reliable rather than brilliant, rapid in assimilating materials and in dispatching business, always accessible, of sufficient learning, courageous in deciding according to his convictions, and of unusual practical sagacity and native shrewdness. Possessed of a direct and vigorous sense of justice, he viewed cases comprehensively, aiming at substantial justice rather than "the sharp quillets of the law". His summaries to juries were characterized by their simplicity, intelligibility, accurate sense of proportion, and impartiality. His judgments, of which over twelve hundred are recorded in the Massachusetts Reports, are compact, clear, and forcible, and, in the opinion of his associates, contain few dicta which will require overruling or qualifications. As a nisi prius judge he is said to have had few equals in the history of the Commonwealth of Massachusetts. In private life he was plain and unassuming and, though of great personal charm and popularity, averse to public display.

Legal offices
Preceded by Ebenezer R. Hoar	Associate Justice of the Massachusetts Supreme Judicial Court; April 15, 1869 – January 16, 1882	Succeeded by Charles Allen
Preceded by Horace Gray	Chief Justice of the Massachusetts Supreme Judicial Court; January 16, 1882 – August 27, 1890	Succeeded by Walbridge A. Field
