= Long Island Head Light =

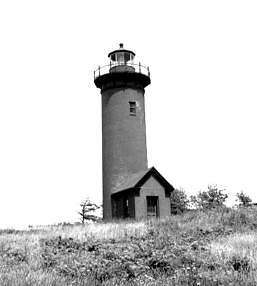
- Current Tower - U.S. Coast Guard photo
- Location: Long Island; Boston Harbor; Massachusetts
- Coordinates: 42°19′48.779″N 70°57′27.624″W

Tower
- Constructed: 1819
- Foundation: Granite
- Construction: Brick
- Automated: 1985
- Height: 16 m (52 ft)
- Shape: Cylindrical
- Markings: White with black lantern
- Heritage: National Register of Historic Places listed place
- Fog signal: none

Light
- First lit: 1901 (current structure)
- Deactivated: 1982-1985
- Focal height: 120 feet (37 m)
- Lens: 3.5 order Fresnel lens (original), Acrylic (current)
- Range: 6 nautical miles (11 km; 6.9 mi)
- Characteristic: Fl W 2.5s
- Long Island Head Light
- U.S. National Register of Historic Places
- Area: 0.1 acres (0.040 ha)
- Architectural style: Italianate
- MPS: Lighthouses of Massachusetts TR
- NRHP reference No.: 87001481
- Added to NRHP: June 15, 1987

Long Island Head Light is an historic lighthouse on Long Island in Boston Harbor, Boston, Massachusetts. The current brick tower is the fourth lighthouse on the island.

The light was first established in 1819, largely as a result of a study conducted by the Boston Marine Society, which had built the daybeacon on Nixes Mate 14 years earlier. It was a 20-foot (6.1 m) stone tower known as "Inner Harbor Light". It was the second of the four Boston lights—103 years after Boston Light, but ten years before the first daybeacon at the site of Deer Island Light, and before The Graves Light, built in 1905. In 1853, it was reported in the New England Farmer, that Captain Charles A. Beck, was keeper of the Light for twenty-eight years.

The stone tower fell into disrepair and was replaced by one of the earliest cast iron lighthouse structures, thirty-four feet tall (pictured below). In 1857, a fourth order Fresnel lens replaced the lamps and reflectors which had been in place. During the next twenty years it sustained damage in a number of storms. In 1881, it was replaced again, by a conical cast iron structure and a new wood keeper's house. Fort Strong was significantly enlarged around the start of the 20th century and it was necessary to move the lighthouse to a location out of the way of the concussion from the guns, so the current brick tower was constructed in 1900-01. Remnants of the fort can be seen to the southeast of the light in the satellite views available by clicking on the coordinates.

The Coast Guard discontinued the light in 1982, but reconsidered the decision in 1985, and installed a modern, solar powered system. It received a major refurbishing in the summer of 1998.

Long Island Head Light was added to the National Register of Historic Places as Long Island Head Light on June 15, 1987.

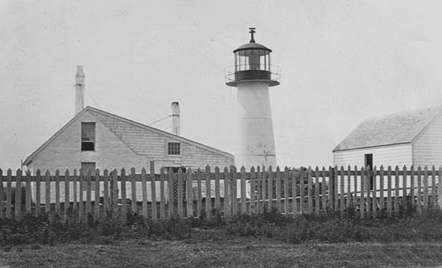
The second tower, built 1843-44, an early cast iron tower

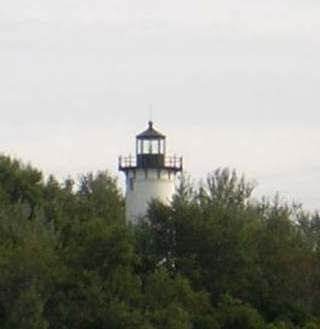
The lantern from the north in 2009

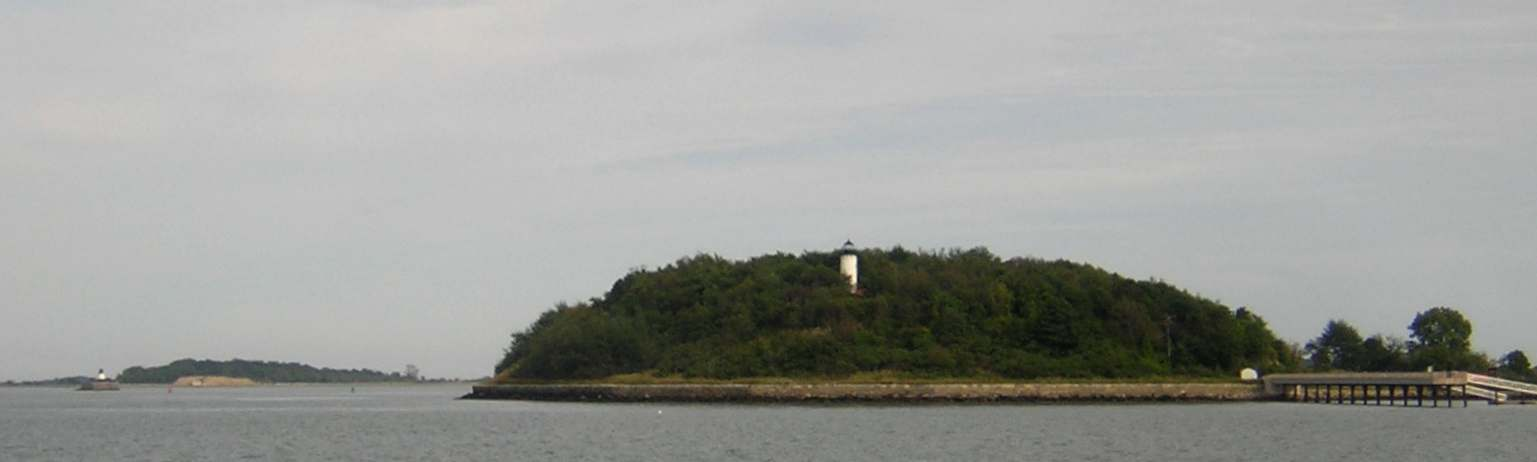
From the west, 2009; Nixes Mate daybeacon is visible to the left

== See also ==
- National Register of Historic Places listings in southern Boston, Massachusetts
