= Long Island (Massachusetts) =

Island in Boston Harbor

Coordinates: 42°19′15″N 70°58′00″W

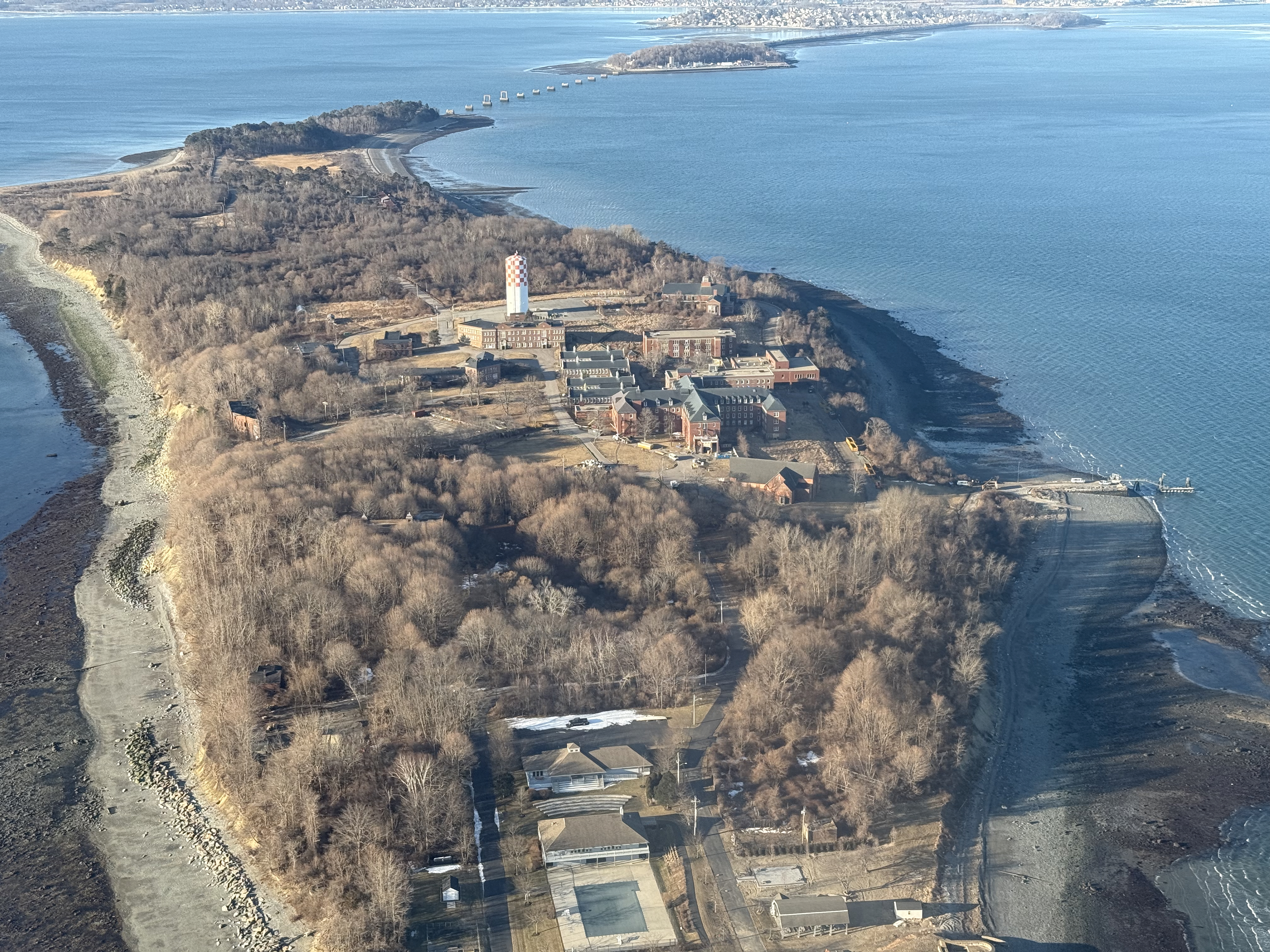
Long Island, Boston Harbor, 2025

Long Island is located in Boston Harbor, Massachusetts. The island is part of the City of Boston, and of the Boston Harbor Islands National Recreation Area. The island is 1.75 miles (2.82 km) long and covers 225 acres (0.9 km^{2}).

Prior to October 2014, access to the island was via a road over a 4,175-foot (1,273 m) causeway from the Squantum peninsula and neighborhood of North Quincy to Moon Island, and from there, over a 3,050-foot (930 m) two-lane steel bridge – officially named the Long Island Viaduct – from Moon Island to Long Island. Access to the causeway leading to Moon Island and Long Island was controlled by the Boston Public Health Commission Campus Police at a guardhouse at its southern end in Squantum, and permission needed to be obtained in advance since it is a restricted area.

In October 2014, all access to Long Island was cut off for the indefinite future by then Mayor of Boston, Marty Walsh, based on the warning of the Massachusetts Department of Transportation that the bridge was unsafe. All those living on Long Island and being served by recovery programs or who were guests in the homeless shelter were no longer able to get there. They were abruptly relocated elsewhere on an emergency basis. The bridge to Long Island was demolished on March 23, 2015. The future uses of the island and its buildings are still under discussion.

== History ==
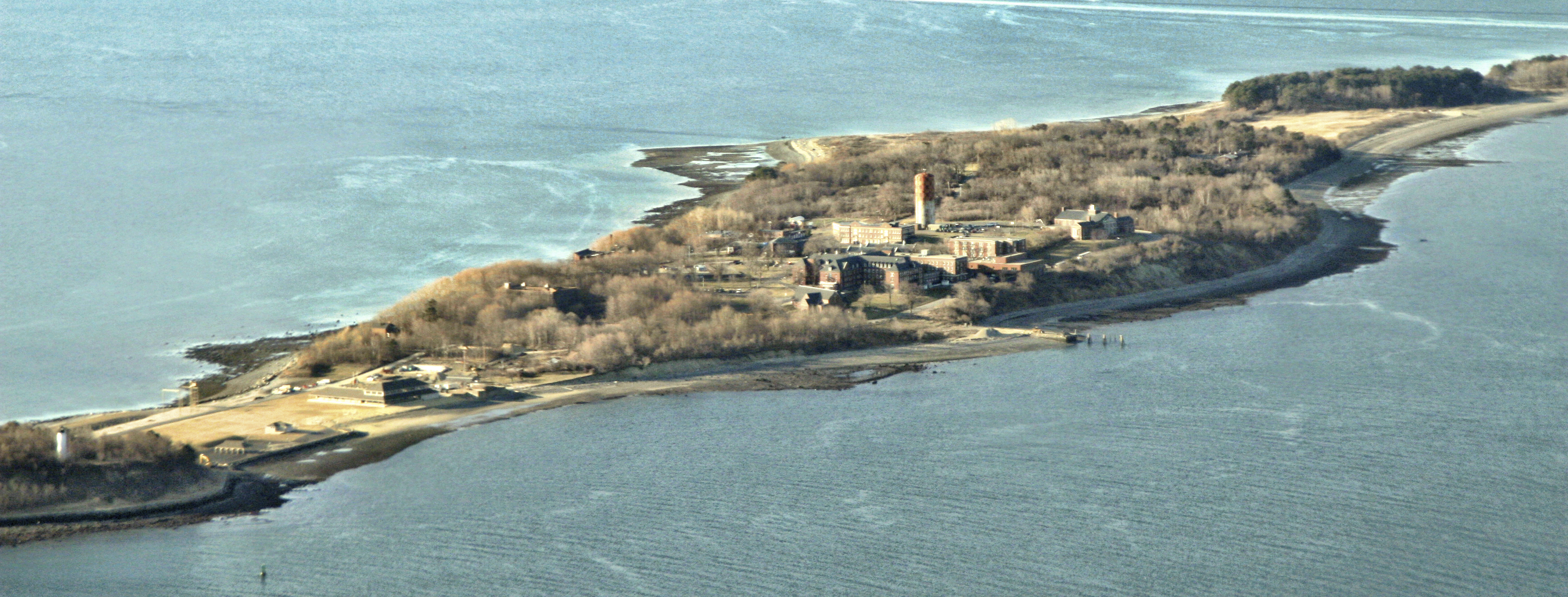
Long Island, Boston Harbor, 2008

=== Seventeenth century ===
At the beginning of the American colonial period, Long Island was used and populated by Native American Indians. On April 1, 1634, the island was granted to the City of Boston along with Deer Island and Hogg Island (now Orient Heights in East Boston). The rent for these three islands was set at two pounds per year. This grant was confirmed on March 4, 1635, when Spectacle Island was added to the package and the annual rent was reduced to four shillings per year for all four islands.

The Town of Boston leased Long Island to thirty-seven tenant farmers for farming and for the felling of trees. Wood was a much needed commodity in this period since it was the main fuel used for cooking and heating of houses in Boston. Long Island derived its name from its length—a mile and three-quarters long and a quarter mile wide. William Wood in his New England Prospect reported that this isle abounds in wood, water, meadow ground, and fertile ground. He also noted that local farmers put their rams, goats, and swine here for safety during the corn growing season.

On February 24, 1640, the Boston Town Meeting ordered that Long Island be laid out into lots for farming starting at the eastern point on the island. On September 28, 1641, the Right-Honorable William, Earl of Stirling, filed an ownership claim for Long Island. His colonial agent, John Forest, recorded the Earl's claim against Edward Tomlin and others as intruders on Long Island. This claim was proven baseless by the Court in Boston.

On April 19, 1649, the Court in Boston levied an annual rent of 6 pence per acre on the farms on Long Island with payment due on February 1 each year. The proceeds from these rents were slated for the support of the free school in Boston. Because the Long Island tenants refused to pay these rents, in 1655, Boston officials sent a constable out to the island to make the necessary collections.

On March 11, 1667, the Town of Boston deeded the farms on Long Island to the tenants with the stipulation that they pay up their back rent. By this act, the land on Long Island first passed into private hands. In 1672, Joseph and Elizabeth Rock purchased 41 acres (170,000 m^{2}) on Long Island with a mortgage which they paid off by August 9, 1672. The deed described their property as having houses, outhouses, barns, stables, wharfs, yards, orchards, gardens, meadows, pastures, and fishing rights.

In the 1670s during King Philip's War, Christian "praying Indians" were moved from Marlborough and Natick under the auspices of John Eliot, the minister of Roxbury, mostly to Deer Island, but at least one colony was sent to Long Island.

On October 6, 1676, during the panic caused by King Philip's War, Massachusetts residents collected all of the local Native American population from the surrounding towns and herded them to a dock in Watertown on the Charles River. Here, they were loaded on barges and transported to Deer Island where they were abandoned. Through the freezing winter, the Indians' main sustenance was fish and clams taken along the shore and mud flats of the island. No barracks or other housing were provided, and only a scanty thicket on the lee side of the hills protected them from easterly winds. Thousands of Native Americans are presumed to have been marooned on Deer Island that winter; however, only the converted (praying) Indians were counted and recorded. Hundreds of Indians perished of starvation and exposure during the winter of 1676–77. Old Ahatton and other chiefs petitioned the Court in Boston for the rights to visit other islands in Boston Harbor to harvest clams and fish because his people were starving to death. In the Spring of 1677, the surviving Indians were allowed to cross over to Long Island.

On April 19, 1689, John Nelson, a resident of Long Island, led Bostonians in a revolt against Governor Sir Edmund Andros, culminating in the Battle of Fort Hill in Boston. Governor Andros had rescinded the Massachusetts Charter and all previous laws and contracts that had been negotiated or enacted in the Massachusetts Colony.

During 1690, John Nelson bought all of the property from the tenants on Long Island with the exception of 4.5 acres (18,000 m^{2}) owned by Thomas Stanberg, a shopkeeper from Boston. Stanberg was one of the original tenants on Long Island. Nelson was well connected politically being a close relative of Sir Thomas Temple, and the husband of Elizabeth Stoughton, the niece of Governor William Stoughton. On June 4, Nelson mortgaged his Long Island property to William and Benjamin Browne from Salem, Massachusetts, for 1,200 pounds. Henry Mare managed the Brownes' house and land on Long Island.

In 1692, John Nelson was captured by the French while on a privateering voyage. He was imprisoned in Quebec. It was common for local privateers to receive commissions in Boston but be considered pirates by the other nations of the world—especially the French and Spanish who were the superpowers at the time. While in prison, Nelson learned about secret French plans for attacks against the Massachusetts colonies. Nelson secretly informed the Massachusetts authorities from his prison cell. For this act, Nelson was punished by being transported across the Atlantic Ocean to the Bastille Prison in France. In 1702, after ten years of imprisonment, Sir Purbeck Temple obtained John Nelson's release. Nelson immediately returned home to Nelson's Island (Long Island) as a local hero.

=== Eighteenth century ===
On December 7, 1708, Benjamin Browne, one of the mortgagers of Nelson's Island, died, passing control of the island to his brother, William Browne, who died on February 23, 1716. John Nelson died on December 5, 1721. On September 24, 1724, the land-deed given from John Nelson to the Brownes was declared a mortgage and was annulled by a legal instrument executed by Colonel Samuel Brown, who acted as executor for the Brownes. The ownership of Nelson's Island had reverted to Nelson's heirs in seven parts. Two parts went to John and Mary Nelson, heirs of the oldest son, Temple Nelson. One share went to Nathaniel Hubbard by his wife, Elizabeth Nelson. One part went to Henry Lloyd by his wife, Rebecca Nelson. Another part went to John Steed by his wife, Margaret Nelson, and one part went to Robert Temple by his wife, Mehitable Nelson. Robert Nelson bought up an additional four shares.

Robert Temple and the other owners sold the whole of Nelson's island to Charles Apthorp, a merchant from Boston. The deed described the island as containing 200 acres (0.8 km^{2}) of land, single houses, buildings, barns, stables, orchards, gardens, pastures, fences, trees, woods, underwoods, swamps, marshes, meadows, arable land, ways, water courses, easements, commons, common pasture, passages, stones, beach, flats, immunites, commodies, heriditaments, emoulants, and appurtenances. The name used for the island changed to Apthorp's Island at this time, although both names are found in various records. Charles Apthorp died on November 18, 1758, at 60 years of age. His heirs sold the island to Barlow Trecothick, later an alderman and Lord Mayor of London. Trecothick had married Grizzell Apthorp, the oldest daughter of Charles Apthorp and Grizzell Eastwicke Apthorp.

=== American Revolutionary War ===
During the Revolutionary times in 1768, the occupying British forces used Long Island for grazing their sheep, cattle, and swine. The British also harvested the hay from this island's meadows as feed for their horses in Boston.

On July 12, 1775, Colonel John Greaton with a detachment of 500 American soldiers, in 65 whaleboats, raided Long Island where they "liberated" all the sheep and cattle grazing there, and captured 17 British sailors who were guarding the animals. British men-of-war, when alerted about the raid, fired at the whaleboats. A British schooner, towing barges loaded with armed marines, chased the American whaleboats back to their encampment in Squantum and Dorchester. One American soldier was killed on Moon Island. Moon Island was not connected to Squantum at this time and a waterway was open from behind Squantum (Squaw Rock) across the mouth of the Neponset River to a large rock called Savin Hill.

On Sunday, March 17, 1776, British ships evacuated Boston under pressure from George Washington's forces on the heights on Dorchester (now South Boston). Abigail Adams, from her vantage point in a part of Braintree that is now Quincy, described the sight of the myriad masts of the British fleet as like a forest in the harbor. On board the British ships were 11,000 soldiers and sailors and 1019 self-exiled citizens of Boston, including 102 civil officers, 18 clergymen and 105 loyalists from the country towns.

Instead of immediately departing the Boston Harbor area, the British ships anchored in the outer harbor and continued the blockage of Boston Harbor for the next three months, which was a cause of great concern in Boston and the surrounding towns. British Commodore Banks on his 28-gun "Milford" and several other men-of-war commanded the blockading British fleet. As the blockade persisted, Abigail Adams was quite outspoken about the delay by the Boston authorities in removing the British blockade from the outer harbor. During June, fierce artillery battles were waged between the British ships and American shore batteries that were entrenched on the harbor islands. The embarrassment from her remarks may have triggered the following actions:

On June 13, 1776, American General Ward ordered Colonel Asa Whitcomb and 500 cannoneers with a 13-inch (330 mm) mortar and two field cannons to the East Head of Long Island, while similar emplacements were set up on Hull. This installation was named, "Long Island Battery." At a signal from their commander, Brig. General Benjamin Lincoln, both batteries opened fire on the British fleet. When the British flagship, "Milford" was hit, Commander Banks ordered the rest of the British fleet to sea.

During the confusion created by the cannonading by American artillerymen from East Head on Long Island and from the Hull Batteries, two American privateers attacked the British transport, "Arbella," that was loaded with rich supplies and Scottish Highlander troop replacements. The Arbella was on an approach to Boston Harbor and beat off the initial attack, escaping up Nantasket Roads into the channel off the East Head of Long Island. Obviously, this British transport did not get the word about the evacuation of Boston. Captain Tucker's Marblehead, Massachusetts privateer took up the chase from Broad Sound along with an armed vessel from Rhode Island that approached the Arbella from the east side of Long Island. They found that the Arbella had grounded but was still able to fight, as her guns shattered Tucker's spars and riddled his ship's sails and Pine Tree Flag. The transport then turned and drove the Rhode Island privateer around the west side of Long Island. The fight continued until the British ship struck her colors. British captain Major Menjies and 36 men were killed during the battle. The slain Highlanders were buried on Long Island in a solemn procession led by Scottish bagpipers. The wives of the dead soldiers who had accompanied their husbands on this trip marched in the funeral procession. The rich cargo of military stores was quickly moved to Cambridge to help support the American army that was encamped there.

On July 17, 1776, about a month after the British were driven from the outer harbor, the Long Island Battery on East Head fired a thirteen-gun salute in celebration and honor of the promulgation of the Declaration of Independence. Similar salutes were fired from the other batteries throughout Boston Harbor.

Edward Rowe Snow related a story about a Mary, the wife of a Tory, William Burton, who was aboard one of the British ships that formed the blockade on Boston Harbor, together with her husband. A cannonball from the Long Island Battery struck Mary. As she lay dying, she pleaded with her husband not to bury her at sea. A flag of truce was struck that allowed Burton to go ashore with his wife's body. Mary Burton was buried on East Head after her body was sewn into a red blanket. One of the Americans agreed to put her name on a grave marker. Her husband planned to return to Boston but never did. Over the years, the wooden marker rotted away. People who knew this story erected a stone cairn over the burial site. In 1804, some fishermen were wrecked on Long Island and they took refuge in an old powder magazine. As they were building a fire, they were startled by a moan coming over the hill near Mary Burton's cairn. The stunned fishermen claimed to have seen a form of a woman wearing a scarlet cloak coming over the hill. Blood appeared to be streaming down the cloak from a wound in her head. The ghost just kept on walking by the fishermen and soon disappeared over the hill. Again, during the War of 1812, a "woman in scarlet" was reported at Fort Strong. Also, in 1891, Private William Liddell reported seeing a "woman in scarlet." Liddell, while on guard duty at night, reported that that ghost came toward him from an easterly direction emitting distinct moans.

Barlow Trecothick, the owner of Long Island, died on May 28, 1775, and the island passed to his brother-in-law, Charles Ward Apthorp from New York (died 1796). Apthorp sold the island on June 13, 1791, to James Ivers of Boston. Around this time, the island began to be officially called Long Island.

In 1794, a lighthouse was built on the northern head of the island, replaced by a bigger tower in 1819. It was later relocated to fit in with coastal fortifications.

=== Early nineteenth century ===
In 1814, during the War of 1812, the Massachusetts authorities requested that Commodore Bainbridge move the new ship, "Independence" and the frigate, "Constitution" down the harbor so that the British could capture them, hoping to avoid having the British shell the City of Boston. Bainbridge refused and suggested that Long Island be fortified to keep the British from entering Boston Harbor.

James Ivers died in Boston on June 13, 1815, at 88 years of age. Long Island legally passed to Ivers' two daughters, Hannah, the wife of Jonathan Austin, and Jane, wife of Benjamin Austin.

In 1818, a committee from the Boston Marine Society investigated the need for a lighthouse on Long Island Head, acting on a request from the Portland (Maine) Marine Society. This lighthouse would be designed to help vessels navigating into Boston Harbor through the Broad Sound Channel.

Another committee of five selected a suitable site for a lighthouse in April 1819. The first lighthouse built on Long Island Head was constructed on the eastern side of Long Island Head. The finished light was a 23-foot (7 m) rubble stone and granite tower. The lantern was positioned about 109 feet (33 m) above MHW-Mean High Water. (The height of a light is measured from MHW to the focal plane of the light source or bulb. The light's characteristic was a fixed white beam generated from nine burners and reflectors with a visibility of about 15 nautical miles (28 km). This light, called the "Inner Harbor Light", was the second lighthouse established in Boston Harbor. The first light keeper was Jonathan Lawrence. The 35 acres (140,000 m^{2}) needed for this first lighthouse had to be acquired by the Federal Government by a lawsuit. The "Inner Harbor Light" was first lighted in October 1819. The lighthouse property was surrounded by fortifications located along the edge of the cliff.

Jonathan Lawrence, who was the first lightkeeper at Long Island Light, died in the Light Service in 1825. Charles Beck, the second light keeper ran a signal system from Long Island Head in 1825. Beck hoisted a black ball to indicate when more pilots were needed down the harbor. This signal system remained active until 1851.

An 1830 commentary described Long Island as the most pleasant place in Boston Harbor and predicted that it would be a great area for a summer resort. The article also noted that a hotel, erected by the Long Island Company, was commodious and convenient. Much of Long Island was being used for pasture in more recent years. Unfortunately, by 1840, the popularity of Long Island faded over the previous ten years and there was only one farmhouse reported on the island.

In 1843, J.W.P. Lewis, a civil engineer, reported that the light tower was leaky and the walls were cracked from frost heaves. Lewis also indicated that the light was not positioned correctly for its intended purpose. The light fixture reflected with a cast the light in six different directions. He described the lantern as being made of the rudest materials and as being obstructed by the framework that supported the covering for the light. Lewis inspected most lighthouses in New England during 1843.

In 1844, a new cast-iron lighthouse was constructed on Long Island Head. This was the second lighthouse built on the Head. It appears to be the first cast-iron lighthouse constructed in the United States. The South Boston Iron Company performed the work. This lighthouse was cast in sections of about 7 feet (2 m)seven feet in height and 12 feet (4 m)twelve feet in diameter at the base. It was furnished with an iron deck providing a twenty-inch walkway around the lantern. The deck had a railing. A cast-iron circular staircase on the interior led to the lantern room. The lantern was made of upright wrought iron bars to receive the glass with sixteen 48" x 16" side over which was a cast-iron dome with a cast-iron pipe in the center that served as a smoke flue for the lighthouse's stove.

On October 1, 1847, the Ivers' heirs sold Long Island to Thomas Smith of Cohasset, Massachusetts. The East Head, where the lighthouse was located, was not included in this sale. Long Island was on the verge of being developed, but an ominous rumor about a pending takeover by the City of Boston for its various institutions made this real estate undesirable to investors. The use of this island as a military post precluded any recreational expansion and development.

On May 1, 1849, Long Island was purchased from Thomas Smith and was incorporated by the Long Island Company. At this time, the only inhabitants were George Smith, a farmer, and Nicolas Capello, a Portuguese fisherman. Over the next 35 years, the heirs of Nicholas Capello and other friends increased the population of Long Island to over thirty families clustering in an area called "Portuguese Village". Their huts and a fleet of fishing boats were located just below East Head.

The Long Island Company built the Long Island House and the Long Island Hotel in the center of the island as part of a project to develop recreational facilities on the island. A Colonel Mitchell was the proprietor of the Long Island Hotel. This hotel was described as a "splendid hotel, large and accommodating, constructed in the form of a Greek Cross and located in the center of the island on the west side". Colonel Mitchell was known as being welcoming, benevolent, and gentlemanly. The Eutaw House was also constructed at this time.

The Long Island Company drew up plans to subdivide Long Island into many small lots and envisioned a large new community. "Pleasure" or vacation brochures of Boston Harbor described the Long Island House as a "large white hotel." The rest of the island was meadows and grazing field. Many of the trees were long since felled for firewood by early settlers.

In 1855, the second Long Island Light was refitted and repositioned into a square enclosure on the wastop of the Head. A good fresh-water was added and a comfortable, stone lightkeepers house was built. The remains of an old military fortifications formed the north and west side of the lighthouse enclosure. The new light was fitted with a Fourth Order Fresnel lens that exhibited a fixed white light and was located where it was visible toward Broad Sound. This light served as part of a range in conjunction with Bug Light on the end of Brewster Spit at the edge of the Narrows Channel. Vessels approaching Boston from the southeast would align these lights to stay clear of Hardings Ledge off Nantasket Beach. Bug Light was constructed in 1856 and showed a fixed red light.

In 1858, a lighthouse Inspector's reports indicated that the lighthouse keeper's house on Long Island had two bedrooms, a parlor, a sitting room, and a kitchen.

=== American Civil War ===
In 1860, control of the Long Island Company was transferred to Thomas J. Dunbar of Boston. The plan to develop this island was thwarted by the rumors of war and plans for military installations on Long Island Head and other parts of the island. Camp Wightman was established on Long Island. The Commander was General Devens who used the Long Island House as his headquarters building. This military post was named after Mayor Wightman of Boston. On April 17, 1861, the 3rd Massachusetts Regiment departed Long Island along with the 4th Massachusetts Regiment, sailing to Fort Monroe, Virginia. These famous regiments were credited with destroying the navy yard at Norfolk, Virginia, and fought the Virginians at Hampton. On their return from the South, the 3rd Massachusetts Regiments were mustered out after four days in camp here. The men of the 4th Massachusetts Regiment were the first northern troops to march on Virginia soil during the Civil War. They also fought at Big Bethel. The 4th Massachusetts Regiment was also mustered out at Camp Wightman on Long Island.

In 1863, Camp Wightman had over 1,000 recruits in addition to several full batteries of heavy artillery under the command of General Devens. The military reservation was located on the slope between the Portuguese Village near the southeast beach and the summit beyond the Long Island House. The steamer "Bellingham" was the conscript boat for Fort Wightman on Long Island.

=== Post-Civil War ===
During 1865, P.B. Small was reported as the light keeper on Long Island Light. In this year, the schooner Joseph Fish, carrying 1,200 barrels (190 m^{3}) of petroleum, was rammed by another vessel while at anchor near Long Island. Light Keeper Small reported that the Joseph Fish caught fire and was totally destroyed.

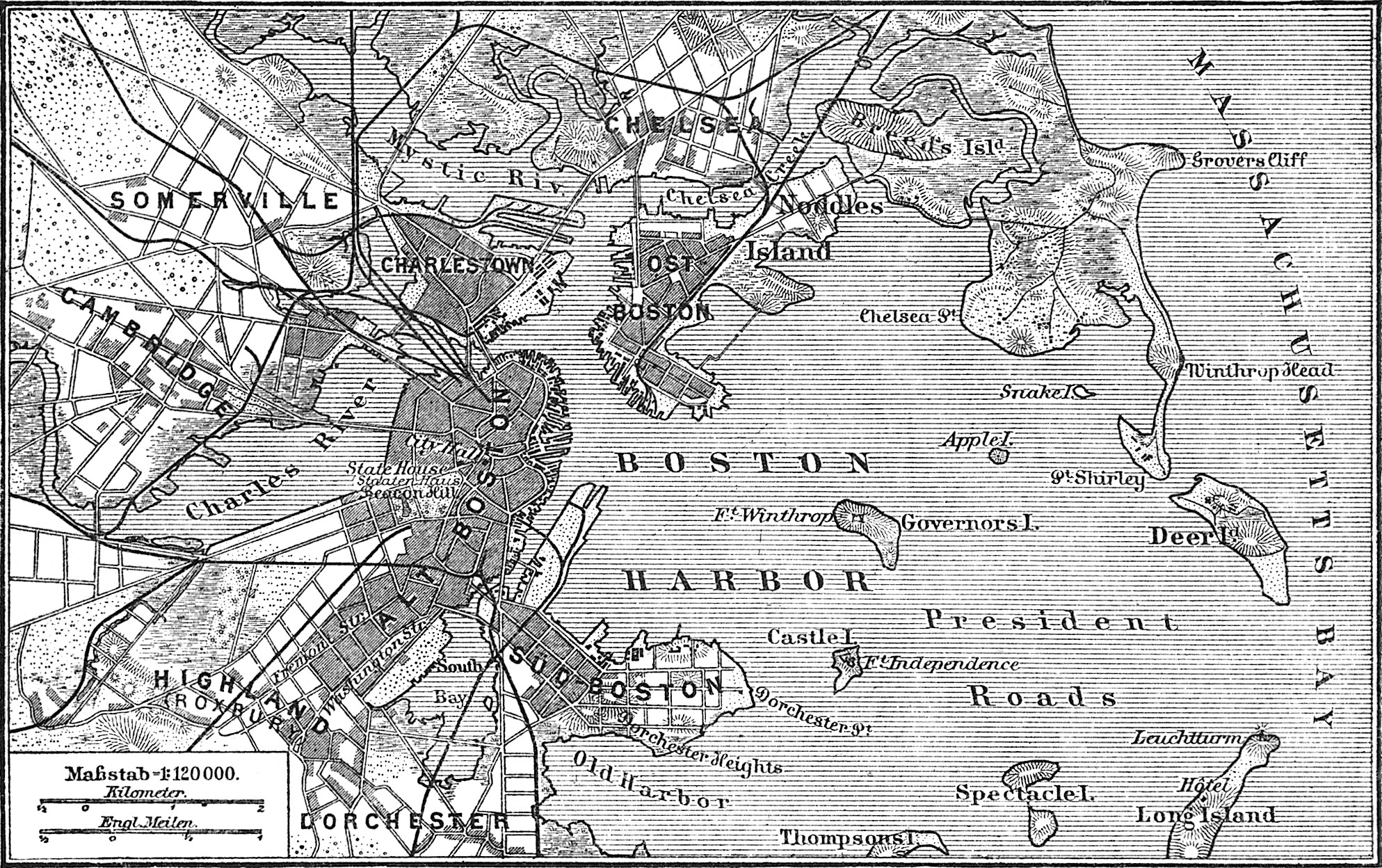
1890 German map of Boston Harbor showing Long Island in the lower right hand corner. It marks a lighthouse ("Leuchtturm") and hotel on the island.

In 1867, the Federal Government acquired the east head section of Long Island by an act of Congress, and Fort Strong was moved to Long Island from Noddle's Island (East Boston). The fort has been reported to be named after Major General George C. Strong, who was killed at Fort Wagner, South Carolina, in 1863. History has shown that Fort Strong existed in 1815 on Noddle's Island.

Later sources write that the fort was re-dedicated and named for the Governor of Massachusetts, Caleb Strong.

Military use of Long Island had been started again during the Civil War when the island was a camp for conscripts and armament was installed. In the early Endicott Period, the defenses were modernized but were not subsequently used.

On September 8, 1869, a tremendous storm (most likely a hurricane) hit the Boston Harbor area. The chimney on the light keeper's house at Long Island Light was knocked off and damaged the roof. Lightning struck and damaged the boathouse that was located just below the lighthouse on the western side of the island.

In 1870, a 10-gun battery was constructed at Fort Strong on East Head on Long Island. In 1872, a large hotel was built on the current site of the Long Island Chronic Disease Hospital.

Long Island became the site of illegal recreational activities. A very popular event on Sunday evenings was prize fighting. On June 29, 1873, the Boston Police raided Long Island and put a stop to these illegal events.

In 1874, the gun blocks and a magazine for the Long Island Head Battery were constructed. These batteries remain today. In 1881, a new cast iron lighthouse was constructed along with a new keeper's house. This was the third lighthouse built on Long Island Head.

In 1882, as was rumored earlier, the City of Boston began purchasing property on Long Island for institutional care facilities: firstly an Almshouse, later (1921) a residence for unwed mothers, a chronic disease hospital, a nursing school and an institutional farm. The large hotel built in 1872 was part of the purchase. This hotel was used for City of Boston charities. During this year, male paupers were moved to Long Island from Rainsford Island.

On January 3, 1885, the Boston City Council passed an order to take possession of Long Island. The island has never returned to private hands since that date. Boston acquired Long Island from the heirs of Thomas Dunbar for $140,000. Buildings were immediately erected for a "Home for the Indigent." These buildings housed 650 people in 1885.

Sweetser described Long Island as conspicuous by its municipal buildings, and still more by its lighthouse perched on the very tip of the steepest cliff in the harbor, eighty-feet above the high-water mark and visible for fifteen miles (24 km) at sea. The battery, which crowns the cliff, presenting only a range of green mounds to the view of the passing sailor, is a formidable little work, of modern construction, with walls of great thickness, bombproofs, and other defenses, partly separated from the rest of the bluff by a deep dry moat.

=== Development of the modern Fort Strong ===
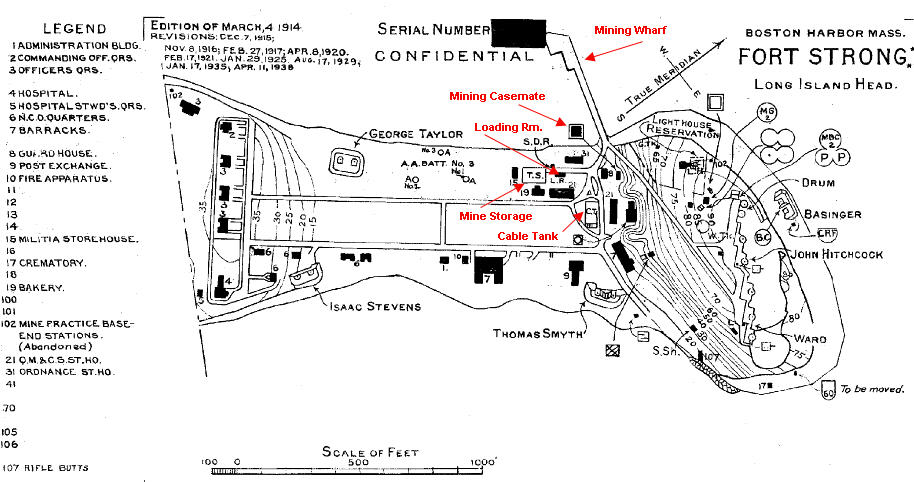
1938 map of Ft. Strong, identifying its gun batteries and other buildings

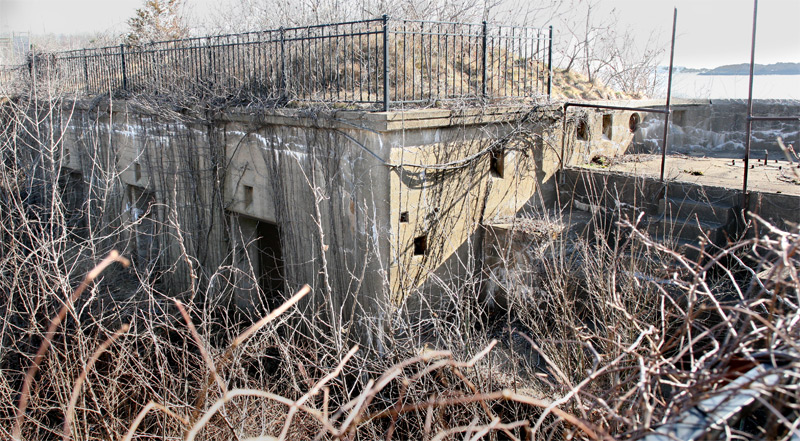
Three-inch Gun Platform #1 of Battery Smyth, Fort Strong (2010)

Ten-inch gun emplacements at Fort Strong (2009)

In 1893 a huge construction project was begun, to build the massive concrete gun emplacements for the five 10-inch guns of Fort Strong, one of the new Coast Artillery forts planned to defend Boston Harbor. The works for these larger batteries still exist today on the northern head of the island (see map at right). These northern emplacements were complete by 1899. Work continued on the 3-inch gun positions on the east and west sides of the parade ground (Batteries Taylor, Basinger, Smyth, and Stevens). These smaller caliber batteries were completed in 1906.

The fort, which had previously consisted of a battery of muzzle-loading cannon atop the northeastern head of the island, was now equipped with the latest in coast artillery, as part of nationwide improvements in coastal defense capabilities recommended by the Endicott Board.

Although the gun batteries were completed in 1906, construction at the fort would continue through the 1920s, eventually creating a total of seven new batteries of 3-inch, 4.7-inch, and 10-inch guns along three sides of the island, extensive facilities for deploying and recovering the tethered mines which filled the nearby channels, and barracks space for over 1,000 members of the Coast Artillery who served at the fort.

Long Island Head was centrally situated in Boston Harbor, and the six 10-inch guns of Batteries Hitchcock and Ward (later reduced to five) had an effective range of roughly seven miles, letting them reach Revere on the north, Hingham on the south, and well out to sea in front of the harbor channels.

Prior to World War II, the mining casemate at the fort (see map) controlled all the submarine mines that protected the southern approaches to Boston Harbor. The rapid fire 3-inch gun batteries constructed on all three shores of the fort overlooked these minefields to destroy attacking ships that might become entangled in them.

By World War II, only the four 3-inch guns of Batteries Basinger and Smyth, plus a battery of anti-aircraft cannon, remained in service, and with the end of the war, the fort was declared surplus. In the 1950s, two buildings supporting the Nike missile system (since decommissioned) were built on the island, and a target tracking radar was constructed at the northwest end of the North Head, in one of the former gun positions of Battery Drum.

=== Twentieth century ===
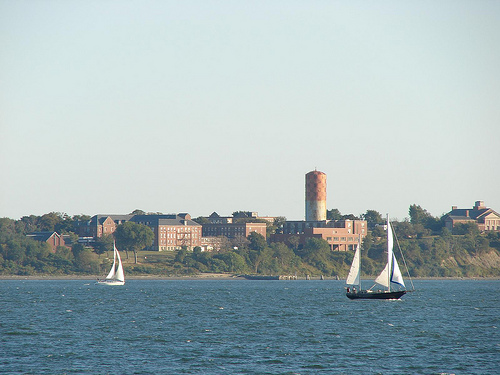
Boston Public Health Commission facilities on Long Island. The old water tower is used by airplane pilots as an FAA visual clue and has checkered markings at the top. From Left to right: Our Lady of Hope Chapel (vacant), the old Administration Building, the Nichols Building, The (Mary) Morris Building behind, the newer McGillivray Building with dining room, the Tobin Building, and the Curley Auditorium (vacant) on the far right (2007 photo)

In 1928, homeless men were housed in an addition to the former hotel, and in 1941 another addition housed a treatment center for alcoholics. New men's dormitory facilities were built and dedicated as the Tobin building, the cornerstone having been laid on November 9, 1940. It was named after Maurice J. Tobin, then Mayor of Boston.

In 1941, Boston's almshouse was located there, as well as the Chronic Disease Hospital. 1,400 patients and inmates were on the island, cared for by several hundred doctors, nurses, and employees. At that time, Dr. James V. Sacchetti was the medical director in charge.

Until the 1950s, when a bridge was built from the adjacent Moon Island, the only transportation access to the island was by boat or a regularly scheduled ferry from Boston. The dedication plaque at the outbound entry to this bridge at Squantum, says it was built in 1950–51 by the Institutions Department of the City of Boston, and calls it the "Long Island Viaduct". Moon Island is connected to the mainland Squantum peninsula of North Quincy by a causeway.

=== 21st century ===
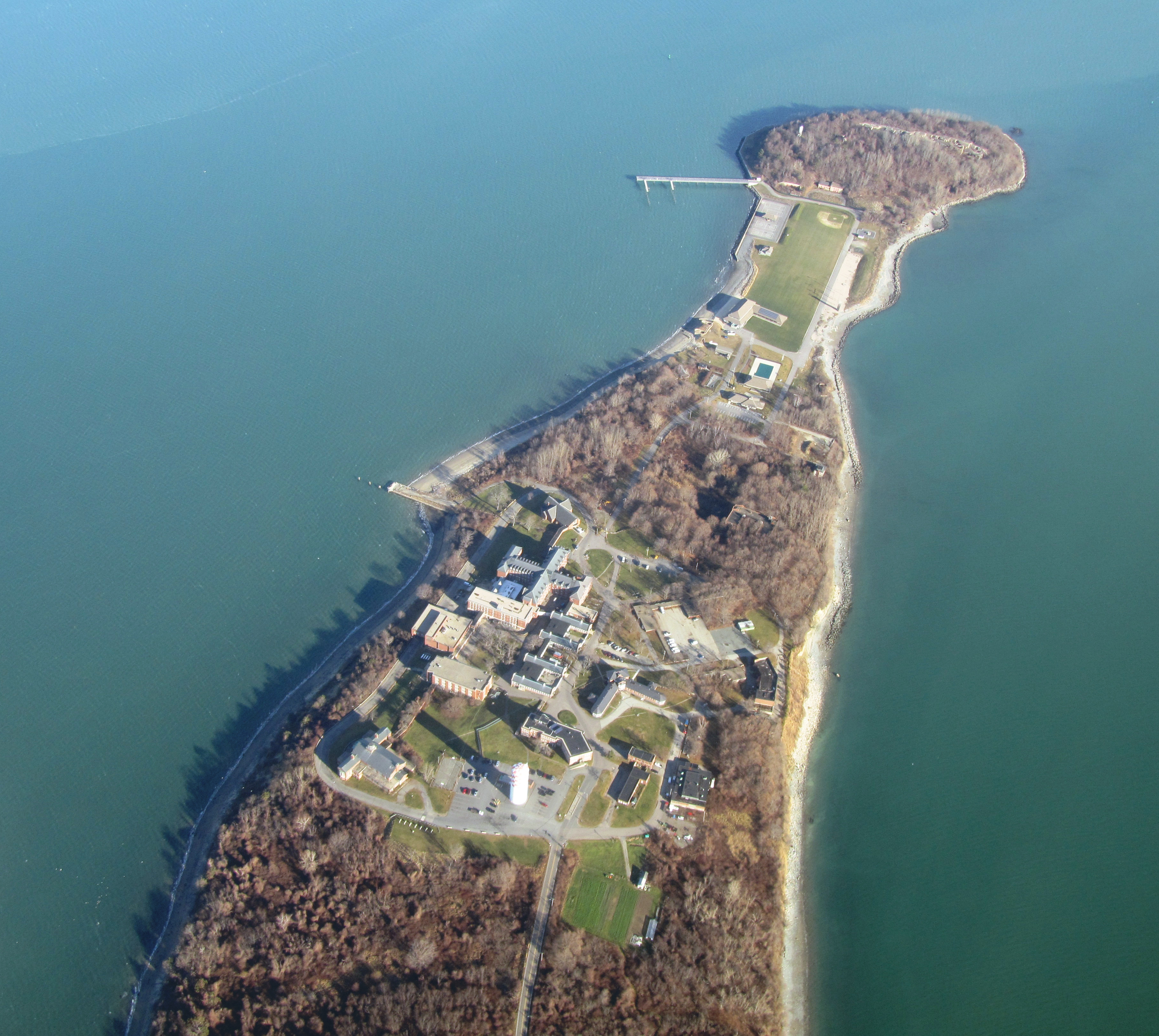
Northern tip of the island, 2012

Long Island was still used to support social service programs through the Boston Public Health Commission. The assistance to unwed expectant mothers and tuberculosis patients had shifted to helping homeless people and providing addiction treatment.

There are many buildings that are not in use which were once very active. Examples of these are the Curley Building (which once housed a performing arts auditorium for the population and named after the former Boston Mayor James Michael Curley), Our Lady of Hope Chapel, and a crematorium, among others. Most of the campus was connected by tunnels, as were most hospitals and universities at the time.

Boston Fire Department's Engine Company 54 station house is located on the island, adjacent to the campus.

Historical buildings and cemeteries dating from the Civil War to the Cold War can be found on the island, along with a large checkered red and white pattern water tower used as a navigational aid by the FAA for navigation into Logan International Airport.

There was also a working organic farm which was 2 acres (8,100 m^{2}) large and harvested approximately 25,000 pounds of produce which was used by the kitchens of the homeless shelters, sold at farmers markets, and used by restaurants in Boston. It was staffed by residents of Long Island. The organic farm was the idea of Mayor Thomas Menino of Boston in 1996 and was modeled on the kibbutz concept.

In 2007, Boston Mayor Thomas Menino helped found and get private funding for a teenagers' day camp on Long Island called Camp Harbor View. A partnership between Boston, Boys & Girls Clubs of Boston, and the camp's non-profit foundation, Camp Harbor View was dedicated in March 2007 and had baseball fields, swimming, classrooms, and many other activities. The number of campers each summer was about 900. It was located where the former marching grounds were, south of Fort Strong and the lighthouse. Another summer camp, Harbor Discoveries, was operated by the city; the New England Aquarium formerly used facilities on Long Island for part of its programming.

== Evacuation and afterwards ==
On October 8, 2014, Mayor Marty Walsh – under the advisement of various City departments, agencies and leaders, and the Massachusetts Department of Transportation (MassDOT) – made the immediate decision to close the Long Island Bridge (which had suffered for decades from neglect and lack of maintenance). All the programs located on Long Island underwent an emergency evacuation. From this moment on, maintenance stopped and the buildings and infrastructure has deteriorated since. The Long Island Bridge was mostly demolished and removed by 2015. By 2018, the city had committed $92 million to replace the bridge, in preparation for restoring the social service programs but since the island is connected by the bridge and causeway to Squantum, the most affluent neighborhood of the neighboring city of Quincy, Quincy objected to the planned replacement, citing major traffic, safety, and environmental risks, suggesting Boston instead opts for a ferry connection. In July 2022, the Massachusetts Supreme Judicial Court ruled that the Quincy Conservation Commission, which had rejected Boston's plans for the new bridge, did not have jurisdiction to overrule the Massachusetts Department of Environmental Protection approval of the plan.

In 2016, the organic farm, for many years worked on and tilled by homeless clients from the Long Island Shelter, and which provided fresh produce for the meals at the city's shelters and programs, was re-opened for private use by a fast food restaurant chain, b.good, who will return part of the crop to philanthropic causes.

In 2021, an analysis initiated by then mayor Marty Walsh estimated the cost of restoring the island's buildings to $500 million, and his successor Michelle Wu has cited the cost of rebuilding the Long Island Bridge to $300 million. Commentators suggest a total cost of nearly one billion dollars must be compared to providing the social assistance programs elsewhere.

In 2025, Boston won another legal victory against Quincy; winning a so-called Chapter 91, key to its plans to restore road access to the island.

== Buildings and structures ==
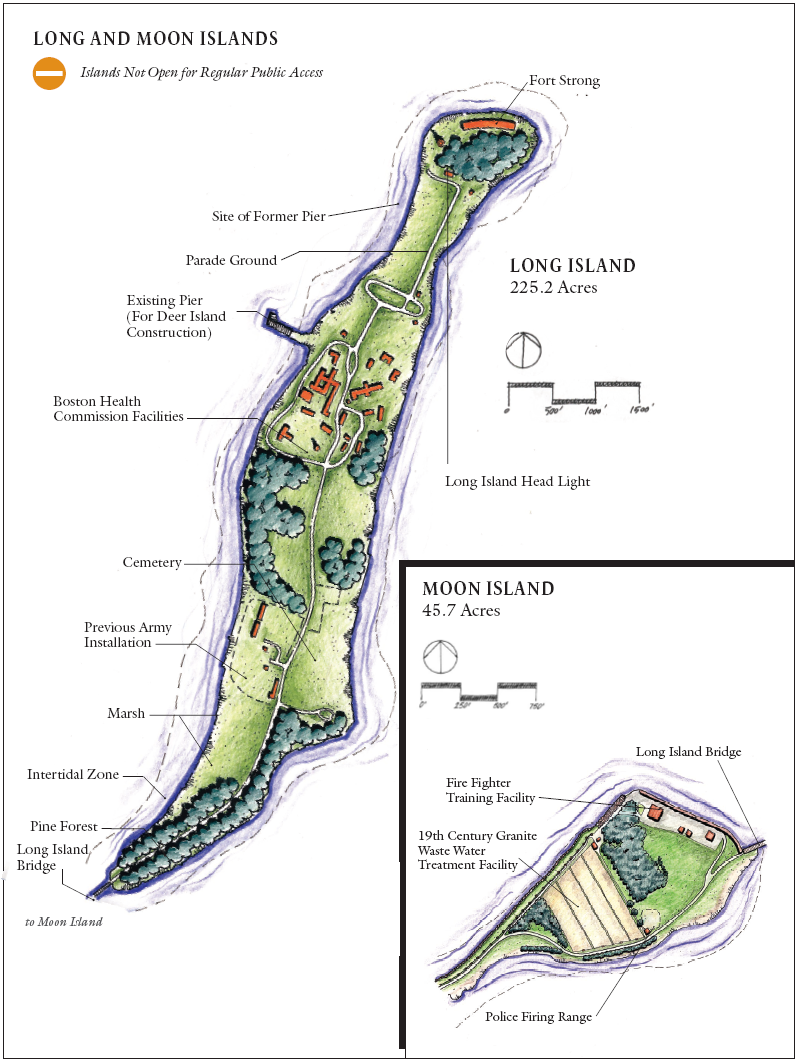
Long Island, together with Moon Island

A list of most buildings and structures on Long Island includes:

- Buildings
  - Former Nike missile facilities (two buildings; vacant)
  - Department of Environmental Protection and Boston Edison Air Monitoring Stations
  - Farm and greenhouse
  - Laundry building
  - Garage
  - Fire house
  - (Mary) Morris building
  - Curley recreation building (vacant)
  - Tobin building
  - McGillivray building
  - Wards A B C D
  - Richards building
  - Laboratory and morgue (vacant)
  - Incinerator, (behind morgue - vacant)
  - Power house
  - Administration building
  - Nichols building
  - Our Lady of Hope Chapel (unused)
  - Building 6 (vacant)
  - Nurses Building (vacant)
  - Sewage treatment plant
  - Fort Strong power house, incinerator, and tower
  - Long Island Head Light
- Fortifications
  - Fort Strong: Battery Ward, Battery Hitchcock, Battery Drum, Battery Basinger, Battery Smyth, Battery Taylor, Battery Stevens.
- Other structures
  - Viaduct (bridge; not open to public)
  - Pier (not open to public)
  - Civil War monument and cemetery
  - hospital cemetery (3,000)
  - unmarked cemetery
  - water tower
  - MWRA (Massachusetts Water Resources Authority) shaft
  - Grotto Shrine of Our Lady of Fatima. It was once next to the older demolished original chapel building.

== Legacy and in popular culture ==
American writer Dennis Lehane was inspired by the hospital and grounds on Long Island for the model of the hospital and island he envisioned in his 2003 novel Shutter Island. Lehane had visited Long Island in the Blizzard of 1978 as a child with his uncle and family.

In the summer of 1987, an independent motion picture adaptation of the Shakespeare play Richard II was filmed on the grounds of Fort Strong. In 2007, the Boston-based Celtic punk band Dropkick Murphys filmed their music video for "The State of Massachusetts", a single from their album The Meanest of Times, in the unused and abandoned Curley Auditorium on the Long Island Health Campus. The auditorium is located adjacent to one of the City of Boston's largest emergency homeless shelters, the Long Island Shelter. The song was about the effects of drugs on individuals and their families.

== See also ==
- Green Island (Massachusetts)
- Great Brewster
- Little Brewster
- Mass & Cass
- Middle Brewster
- Outer Brewster
