= Mass. and Cass =

Homeless encampment in Boston, Massachusetts

Coordinates: 42.33262°N 71.07231°W

Mass. and Cass, also known as Methadone Mile or Recovery Road, is an area in Boston, Massachusetts, located at and around the intersection of Melnea Cass Boulevard and Massachusetts Avenue. Due to its concentration of neighborhood services providing help, the area around Mass. and Cass has long attracted a large number of people struggling with homelessness and drug addiction, especially after the closure of facilities on Long Island in Boston Harbor. It has been characterized as "the epicenter of the region's opioid addiction crisis".

It was, for many years, a tent city and open air drug market. The tents were removed in the fall of 2023. As of September 2024, the tents were mostly gone but it was still a gathering place for the homeless and drug users. It is located in the area of Newmarket, an industrial part of Boston that includes some of Dorchester, South Boston, Roxbury and the South End.

== Aftermath of Long Island closure ==
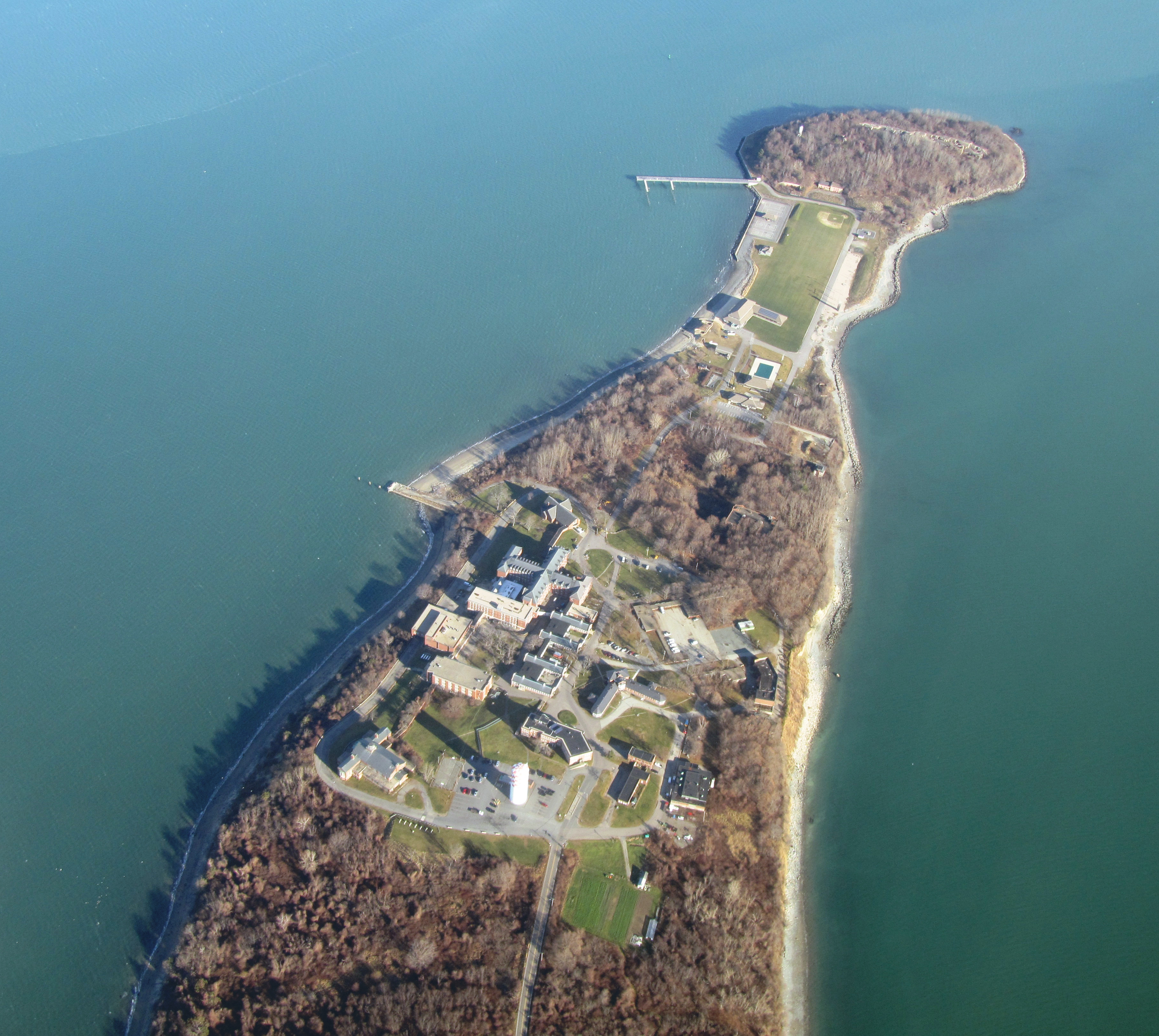
Aerial photo of the northern tip of Long Island, which held the Long Island recovery campus and shelter.

=== Closure of Long Island services ===
On October 8, 2014, the city of Boston condemned the Long Island Viaduct, the neighborhood's only access point to Long Island. This led to closure of all homeless shelters and treatment services previously located on the island, leading to the displacement of approximately 700 people. Before the closure, 57% of the city's substance-use treatment beds were housed on Long Island. The Barbara McInnis House respite center, located in Boston, temporarily sheltered four dozen women on cots. Over a span of several months, around 440 guests per night (at peak capacity) were sheltered on cots and overflow mats at the South End Fitness Center.

=== Shelter openings at Mass. and Cass ===
In January 2015, under the administration of Mayor Walsh, an old Boston transportation building at 112 Southampton St was renovated and turned into a 100-bed men's shelter. In April 2015, it became a 250-bed shelter. In June 2015, the shelter had 450 beds. The Woods-Mullen shelter on Massachusetts Avenue was converted into a female-only shelter in 2015, increasing its beds for homeless women from 66 to 200.

== Business concerns ==
Following the migration of homeless and addicts to Mass. and Cass, businesses in the year reported vandalism and difficulty hiring and retaining employees as they fear for their safety. The Greater Boston Food Bank spent more than $1 million on security since people began camping in the area.

The effects of visible homelessness, addiction, mental illness, and desperation on local workers and housed residents, and the city's attempts to deal with the growing number of homeless people in the neighborhood, have generated considerable controversy. Businesses along Mass. and Cass applauded the tent camp sweeps in October 2021, but they were discontent with the city's decision of siting a temporary shelter at the Round House hotel. The business community expressed that the city reneged on the promise to decentralize services. The mayor did not respond to press inquiries.

== Population ==
As of September 2021, the number of tents in the Mass and Cass area was estimated to have grown from a dozen to more than 100. By July 2023, there were 140 people living in tents, lean-tos, and other ramshackle structures on nearby Atkinson Street. Each morning the area was cleared of people and structures so that the street could be cleaned. Shortly after the city workers finished, the tents, structures, and people would return.

It was estimated in October 2023 that the majority of the people who congregated in the area during the day were not living there, but rather came in from outside of Boston to buy or sell drugs. It was thought that there were between 80 and 90 people who were living there.

== Efforts to clear out the encampment ==
=== Operation Clean Sweep ===
In 2019, Mayor Marty Walsh enacted plans to deal with the homelessness situation in the area.

In an effort dubbed "Operation Clean Sweep", on August 1 and 2, 2019, the Boston police department made a series of 34 arrests in the Mass. and Cass area. With no notice, police confiscated and destroyed all encampment property, including wheelchairs, by crushing people's belongings in a garbage truck compressor. On August 1, 2019, a corrections officer was assaulted outside South Bay House of Correction.

Operation Clean Sweep, in its two-day period, cost the city of Boston around $20,500 in police overtime. Critics of Operation Clean Sweep stated that it terrorized homeless residents, who avoided medical and social service providers for months following arrests, out of fear of being abused or incarcerated. It was also reported that the operation caused an increase in fatal overdoses, due to the separation of drug-users and providers that respond to and reverse overdoses in the Mass. and Cass area. In 2020, the ACLU accused Boston police of intimidation tactics and unlawful detention of pedestrians during Operation Clean Sweep. The Boston Globe revealed that Boston Police Commissioner William Gross praised the arrests in an email. Following the operation, encampments gradually returned to the area.

Despite these interventions, widespread homelessness continued to be a problem when Walsh left office in 2021. Walsh was succeeded by interim mayor Kim Janey.

=== Sheriff's proposal to force treatment of individuals ===
In September 2021, during Janey's tenure, Suffolk County Sheriff Steve Tompkins published his proposal for Mass. and Cass. His plan was to incarcerate people living in tents near Mass. and Cass at a former detention center in the South Bay House of Correction, where they would be subjected to involuntary treatment. In response to the proposal, advocates and attorneys asked Tompkins and other law enforcement agencies to provide more information about the deaths of four prisoners, who all died in a three-month span while in the custody of the Suffolk County Sheriff's Department. One of these people, Ayesha Johnson, died in the South Bay House of Correction after being civilly committed to treatment.

At the time of Tompkins' proposal, Massachusetts was facing a lawsuit over using correctional facilities to house men who are civilly committed under Section 35, the state law that allows a judge to involuntarily commit a person to addiction treatment for up to 90 days. In 2016, Massachusetts stopped housing civilly committed women in jails and prisons in response to a lawsuit. Now, women must be sent to inpatient treatment facilities instead of jails and prisons. Men can still be put in correctional facilities when they are involuntarily committed for treatment of substance use disorder. Massachusetts is the only state that allows people civilly committed for substance use disorder to be held in prison.

=== Executive order to clear encampment ===
On October 19, 2021, Janey announced, in an executive order, that Boston would begin clearing out the encampment in the Mass. and Cass neighborhood. Janey cited a lack of hygienic facilities in tents, sexual assaults and crime, and the prevalence of overdoses in the area. Advocates objected, stating that the dismantling of the tents and other makeshift structures would be a waste of resources, as well as a blatant criminalization of homelessness and addiction.

The 2021 sweeps continued an ongoing local conversation between stakeholders about involuntary treatment. Despite messaging from the city of Boston that expressed a willingness to get homeless people with outstanding warrants into substance-use treatment, The Boston Globe found local courts were sending more people from the encampments to jail than to treatment. Suffolk District Attorney, Rachael Rollins, was quoted expressing disappointment at the incarcerations, describing the outcomes as "having the opposite of what was discussed happen".

During the sweeps, several people were arrested for outstanding warrants. The American Civil Liberties Union of Massachusetts sued to halt the Janey administration's removal of campers from Mass. and Cass. The lawsuit demanded that people who were removed should be allowed to return. The suit also sought damages for three plaintiffs whose property was destroyed.

=== Sweep and diversion to low-threshold shelters ===
Mayor Michelle Wu assumed office on November 16, 2021. On January 12, 2022, Boston outreach workers, shelter workers, and police officers began a large sweep of the Mass. and Cass encampments as part of a "public-health centered approach to encampment resolution". Campers had a day to remove their belongings under threat of arrest. During the city-sanctioned sweep on January 12, Boston police officers logged just over $17,000 in overtime payments in one day.

From January 12 to October 31 of 2022, Boston placed 1,960 people in short-term substance-use treatment placements and sheltered 417 people at six low-threshold sites. Although the sweep successfully transitioned many people into temporary housing, Mass. and Cass outreach workers struggled afterward to locate and serve the estimated hundred people that were displaced from the camps without shelter. Advocates say the number of people in the encampments was undercounted and underestimated, leading to a scarcity of resources and leading to various crises for those who could no longer camp in the neighborhood.

Some people moved from sleeping at Mass. and Cass to under bridges, in train tunnels, on sidewalks, and in various other locations not meant for habitation. In a WGBH investigation, two people who were displaced from the encampment (one diagnosed with HIV, one diagnosed with lupus and myeloma) said city outreach workers were only able to secure one week in a hotel for them, following the sweeps. After a week, the couple returned to the Mass. and Cass neighborhood with no housing options. WGBH identified 12 people who formerly lived in the encampment and had not been offered transitional housing the night of the sweep.

In December 2022, Mayor Wu confirmed 150 people displaced from the sweep were still on the waitlist to get a bed at one of the city-sponsored low-threshold sites. In July 2023, the transitional housing site at the Roundhouse was closed, due to lack of funding. The closure displaced the facility's sixty residents.

The City Council adopted a new ordinance in October 2023 to make it easier for the City to remove the encampment. With the new powers, Wu gave those living in tents in the area until the end of the month to vacate the area in an attempt to "permanently shift the dynamic on the street and in the surrounding neighborhood." Before removing the tents, city workers were required to offer their occupants shelter, transportation to shelter, and the opportunity to store their personal belongings.

== Aftermath of the sweep ==
After Wu cleared the area of tents, those who had been living in them spread out to other parts of the city. Crime in other neighborhoods, particularly Downtown and the South End, rose dramatically. Between the first half of 2019 and the first half of 2024, there was an increase in shoplifting reports of 55%.

== Collection of syringes ==
As of October 2022, the city of Boston collected nearly three times the number of syringes it gave out since January 2022, according to Bisola Ojikutu, executive director of the Boston Public Health Commission.

== Rise in violence ==
In the summer of 2023, organizations serving those living at Mass. and Cass stopped sending outreach workers to the area due to an increase in violence. Wu sounded "a new level of public safety alarm" and said the situation was "untenable". In July, there were 99 reported incidents of violent or property crime, compared to 53 the previous July. By October, there had been 220 overdoses reversed in 2023, with a weekly average of 345 medical emergencies.

In August, Wu announced a plan to increase police presence and ban tents in the neighborhood. Her proposal gave police the explicit power to remove tents, that she said had "been shielding much of the dangerous activity in the area and undermining the ability of providers to safely and effectively deliver services". Police would be obliged to offer the tent owners 48 hours notice, transportation to services, and storage for personal belongings.

On August 26, 2023, City Councillor Tania Fernandes Anderson was mugged in the area when she visited to see the area firsthand. Within moments of getting out of her car, and while standing close to a police cruiser, a man rushed her and stole her phone.

== Police presence ==
People living at Mass. and Cass had complained repeatedly that uniformed police officers do not react or intervene when violent assaults occur against members of the homeless community there.

In December 2025, BPD Commissioner Michael Cox reported that 54% more arrests were made at Mass and Cass in the year 2025 than had been made in 2024.

Boston police established a command center in the area in October 2023 to enforce the breakdown of the camp and to support outreach workers. Mobile squads will respond to reports of additional encampents opening up in other parts of the city.

=== Overtime spending ===
Boston police officers collected nearly $4 million in overtime pay between 2019 and 2020 for work at Massachusetts Avenue and Melnea Cass Boulevard. All the Mass. and Cass overtime hours in 2019 and 2020 were listed in city payroll reports under a “special events” category, which is also used to track the number of police hours worked during the Boston Marathon, the St. Patrick's Day parade in Southie, Red Sox games and Fourth of July details.

The 2019/2020 overtime report was criticized by homeless advocates, mental health professionals, and public policy experts, who stated the money could have been spent on expanding overburdened services, building more low-threshold housing, and raising the salaries of low-paid outreach workers in the area.

Newmarket Business Association president, Sue Sullivan, was surprised by the number. Sullivan expressed that though she has seen some officers intervene, she finds most sit in their cars and seem hesitant to engage with the homeless residents of Mass. and Cass. In the summer of 2022, the Newmarket Business Association paid a private security company “between $500,000 and $1 million” to respond to situations in the neighborhood, because they found police often take over 45 minutes to respond. Police union president Larry Calderone confirmed this response time, stating that police tend to be completely exhausted when they work overtime shifts.

In the first 10 months of Mayor Michelle Wu's tenure, up through August 2022, Boston police logged more than $4 million in overtime payments in the area, according to police payroll records. Between 2021 and August 2022, the city spent around $8 million on police overtime, payroll data show — nearly double the $4.3 million spent in the previous two years combined. Police overtime accounted for around half of the 2022 budget for city spending on all services at Mass. and Cass, excluding state and federal grants, according to a budget breakdown provided by the city. For overtime shifts, officers made 1.5 times their standard hourly rate at an average of $66 per hour, depending on rank and seniority. Some officers make as much as $86 per hour, according to the union's contract with the city.
