= William Fly =

English pirate

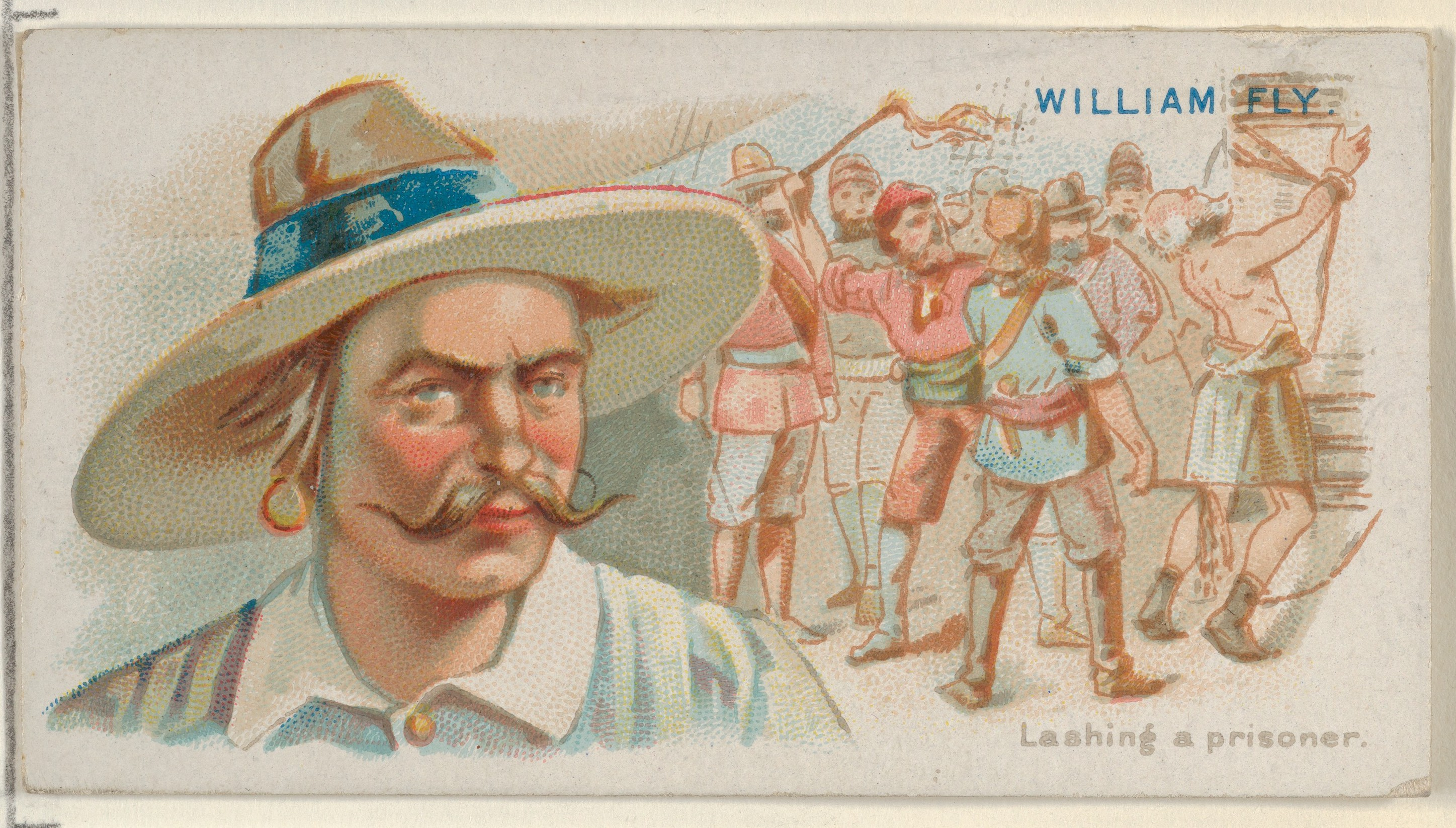
- Died: 12 July 1726; Boston, Massachusetts
- Cause of death: Execution by hanging
- Known for: Considered one of the last pirates of the Golden Age of Piracy
- Criminal charge: Piracy
- Criminal penalty: Execution by hanging
- Criminal status: Executed
- Piratical career
- Allegiance: none
- Years active: 1726
- Rank: Captain
- Commands: Elizabeth / Fames Revenge

William Fly (died 12 July 1726) was an English pirate who raided New England shipping fleets for three months in 1726 until he was captured by the crew of a seized ship. He was hanged in Boston, Massachusetts, and his body publicly exhibited in a gibbet as a warning to other pirates. His death is considered by many to mark the end of the Golden Age of Piracy.

== Career ==
William Fly's career as a pirate began in April 1726, when he signed on to sail with Captain John Green to West Africa on the Elizabeth. Green and Fly began to clash until one night Fly led a mutiny that resulted in Green being tossed overboard; Fly then took command of the Elizabeth. Having captured the ship, the mutineers "caused a Black Flagg to be hoisted", renamed the ship Fames' Revenge, elected Fly as captain, and sailed to the coast of North Carolina and north toward New England. They captured five ships in about two months before being captured themselves.

William Fly and his crew were hanged at Boston Harbor on 12 July 1726. Reportedly, Fly approached the hanging with complete disdain and even reproached the hangman for doing a poor job, re-tying the noose and placing it about his neck with his own two hands. His last words were, roughly, a warning to captains to treat their sailors well and pay them on time – "Our Captain and his Mate used us Barbarously. We poor Men can’t have Justice done us. There is nothing said to our Commanders, let them never so much abuse us, and use us like Dogs." Fly urged that "all Masters of Vessels might take Warning of the Fate of the Captain that he had murder'd, and to pay Sailors their Wages when due." Pastor Benjamin Colman of Boston also preached to Fly and the condemned pirates. He described Fly's unrepentant trip to the gallows: "Fly briskly and in a way of bravery jumpt up into the Cart, with a nose gay in his hand, bowing with much unconcern to the Spectators as he pass'd along, and at the Gallows he behaved still obstinately and boldly till his face was covered for death." Following Fly's execution, his body was hung in chains (gibbeted) on Nixes Mate Island in Boston Harbor as a warning to others not to turn to piracy.
