= Transitional housing programs in Boston =

Temporary housing program for the homeless in Massachusetts

There were six transitional housing programs created under the Wu administration in Boston in January 2022. Mayor Michelle Wu's administration cleared a tent encampment of several hundred people living in the area known locally as the Mass and Cass (also known as "Methadone Mile"), and created six low-threshold, transitional housing sites to divert people displaced from the encampment. The transitional housing sites created were the Roundhouse Hotel, Willow, Dorm One, EnVision Hotel, The Cottages at Shattuck, and The Pine Street Inn.

== EnVision Hotel ==
EnVision Hotel
- Founded at: 81 S Huntington Ave, Boston, MA 02130
- Parent organization: Victory Programs
- Affiliations: Streets to Home

As of February 2022, 41 adults from Mass and Cass were temporarily housed in single occupancy rooms with private bathrooms at EnVision Hotel in Mission Hill. EnVision is staffed by Victory Programs and utilizes Streets to Home to assist residents in accessing permanent housing. On February 16, 2022, the Community Alliance of Mission Hill held a meeting in which "attendees were broadly supportive of the program but believed that stricter protocols were needed" to address a rise in local public intoxication and theft.

== Roundhouse Hotel ==
Roundhouse Hotel
- Formation: January 1, 2022
- Founded at: Boston, Massachusetts
- Parent organization: Boston Public Health Commission
- Budget: Housing Services: $7,487,000; Clinical Services: $5,600,082

=== Background ===
Before being used as a social services location, the Roundhouse's building was a Best Western hotel, and originally, a structure to store coal gas. In December 2021, Boston Mayor Michelle Wu announced the use of the vacant Roundhouse building to shelter homeless campers as a transitional housing and addiction treatment center. It opened in February 2022 and it is scheduled to close by September 30, 2023. The Roundhouse was the most controversial site, due to being so geographically close to Mass and Cass. The site housed up to sixty people at a time.

=== Opposition ===
South End business owners expressed opposition to Boston's use of the building. They stated the site was too close to the original encampment to be effective at addressing the homelessness and addiction crises. The Boston Police Department began patrolling near the building after it became temporary housing.

=== Operation and treatment ===
The Roundhouse Hotel was one of the only transitional housing sites in Massachusetts that allowed couples to be housed together, and did not force residents to leave if they relapsed. In July 2022, Dr. Miriam Komaromy, medical director of BMC's Grayken Center for Addiction, stated that all sixty residents who moved from the encampment to the Roundhouse at the start of 2022, remained residents and did not go back to live on the street. Komaromy shared that many residents were able to engage in addiction treatment for the first time, due to finally having access to safety and rest. Some tenants were able to move out of the facility, and into permanent housing.

==== Clinical services ====
In February 2022, Boston Medical Center (BMC) opened a low barrier clinic for patients with mental illness and substance use disorders and "an observation and stabilization unit where patients could stay for up to 24 hours for management of withdrawal, over-intoxication, or substance-related symptoms" in the basement of the Roundhouse. Part of the clinic's purpose was to decrease patient overflow in local emergency departments.

=== Shut down ===
In February 2023, BMC announced that it was unable to secure funding to continue the Roundhouse clinical services, and that it planned to discontinue them in March. In March 2023, the state of Massachusetts announced a plan to assist with funding the services through July, in order to give patients and providers time to make other appropriate care plans. The state supplied the funding, in part, to prevent overdose deaths that could result from an abrupt closure of the Roundhouse. Sue Sullivan, executive director of the Newmarket Business Association, stated the services’ closure was celebrated by neighborhood businesses while some opposed the planned closure. Tenants of the Roundhouse were scheduled to finish moving out of the site by September 30, 2023, when the city’s contract lease agreement ends. Wu stated the project was always meant to be temporary.

== The Cottages at Shattuck ==
Shattuck Cottages
- Formation: December 2021; 4 years ago
- Founded at: Lemuel Shattuck Hospital, 170 Morton St, Jamaica Plain
- Parent organization: Commonwealth Care Alliance
- Affiliations: Eliot Community Human Services

In November 2021, Massachusetts' secretary of health and human services, Marylou Sudders, announced a collaboration with the company, Pallet, to build a village of small cottages for up to 30 homeless individuals from Mass and Cass to temporarily reside on the Lemuel Shattuck Hospital campus. The Cottages were created in December 2021. People began moving into Shattuck Cottages from Mass and Cass after the encampment clearing of January 2022.

The Cottages have 24 hour security and do not allow visitors. Hourly rounds are performed to make sure residents are okay. Residents do not have to be sober to live at The Cottages and are encouraged to inform staff if they use drugs so staff can be prepared to reverse overdoses. Some cottages feature planters so residents can participate in gardening as a way to soothe themselves. Shattuck Cottages feature communal bathrooms and a shared space for social events.

Over fifty residents of the Cottages have transitioned into permanent housing. Former Red Sox minor league player, Mike Spinelli, lived at the Cottages until he moved into permanent housing in Fenway Park.
