= Moon Island (Massachusetts) =

Island in Boston Harbor, Massachusetts

Coordinates: 42°18′20″N 70°59′27″W

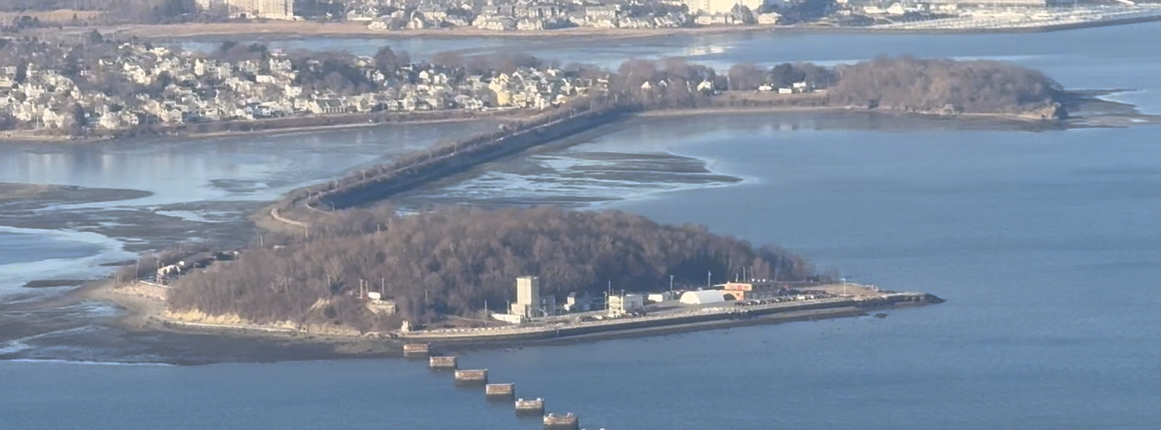
Moon Island in Boston Harbor

Moon Island is an island in Quincy Bay, in the middle of Boston Harbor, Massachusetts, United States. It is the location of the Boston Fire Department Training Academy, and Boston Police Department shooting range. All of the land on the island is owned by the City of Boston but the island is under the jurisdiction of Quincy, Massachusetts. It is also part of the Boston Harbor Islands National Recreation Area.

The causeway to Moon Island did not exist before the late 1870s and there was no bridge across Western Way to Long Island until the construction of the Long Island Viaduct in 1951. This bridge was closed October 8, 2014. The sand spit from Thompson Island to Squaw Rock on Squantum was a clam bar until the sewage outflow from Moon Island backed up into the local waters. Native Americans summered in this area for thousands of years and consumed the prevalent mollusks.

Another two bars pointed from Moon Island toward Squantum, following the general path of the new causeway. In early years, the land where UMass Boston and the Kennedy Memorial are located was open water. The area around Marina Bay was salt marsh leaving a much wider mouth to the Neponset River.

In colonial times, Moon Island was recorded as having 20 acres (81,000 m^{2}) of land mass that was used as pasture. This land was connected at very low tides by two sand bars. The proper approach to this island in the late 19th century was from the Quincy Bay side. There was a 100-foot (30 m) hill on the northerly side. Early inhabitants called the island, "Munning's Moone," or "Mennen's Moon," and is also recorded as "Moon Island" and "Moon Head".

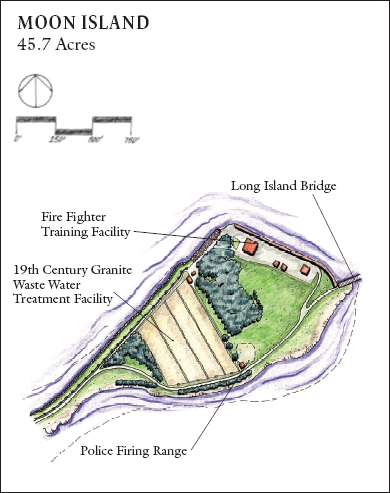
Moon Island, showing island iconography.

Today, Moon Island consists of 44.5 acres (180,000 m^{2}) and is connected to Squantum by a two-lane roadway over the causeway. Moon Island is owned by the City of Boston and is no longer available for public access or use. As with many of the other islands in Boston Harbor, municipal and federal authorities have obtained ownership of Boston Harbor islands over the centuries. Most have never returned to private ownership or use.

Access to the causeway leading to Moon Island is controlled by the Boston Public Health Commission Police at a guardhouse at its southern end, and permission to enter the island must be obtained in advance since it is a restricted area.

== History ==
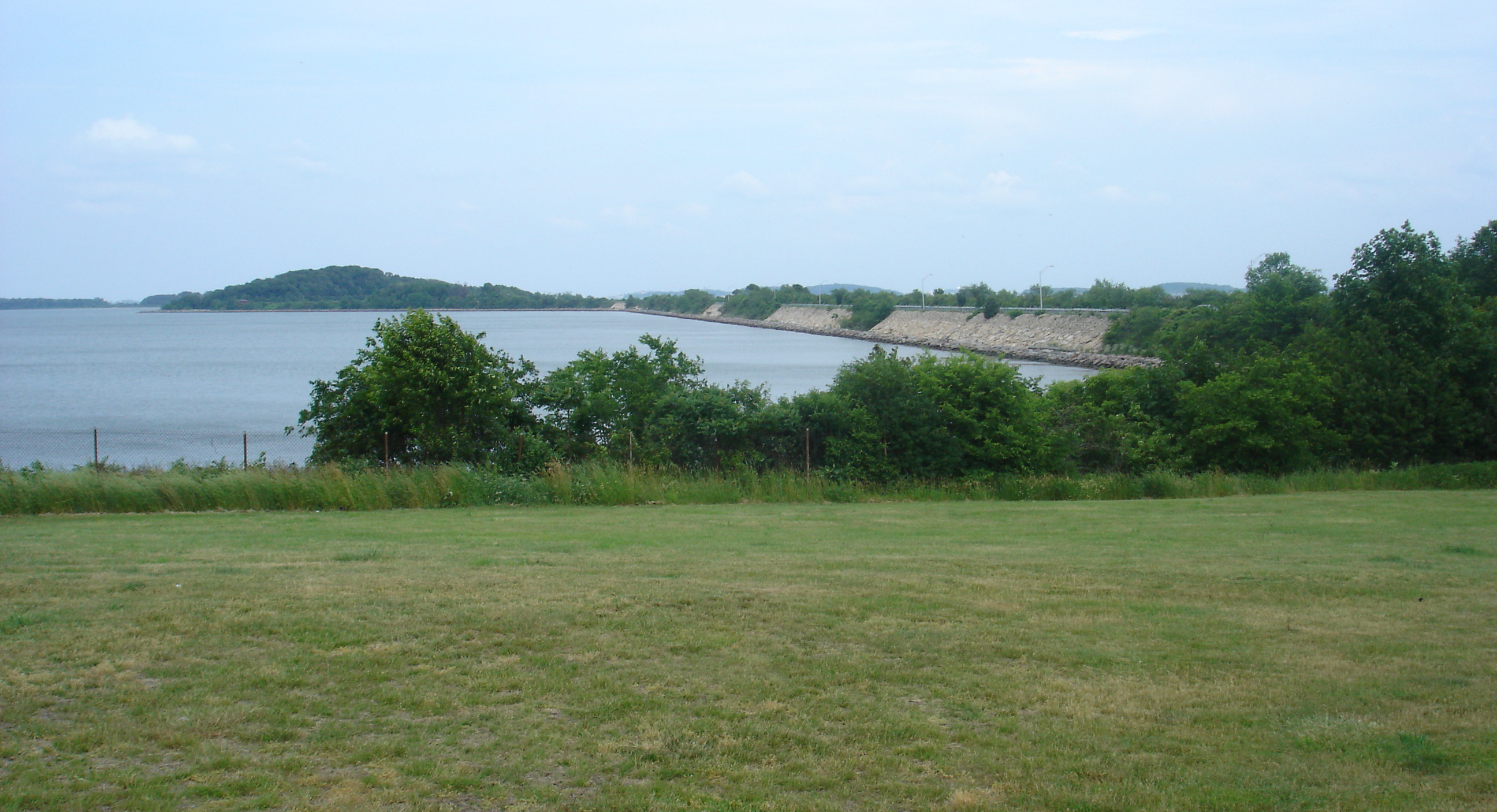
Moon Island and its causeway as seen from Squantum

In colonial times, the island was known as Manning's Moone, and was mainly used for grazing and farming. On June 2, 1641, by order of the General Court of Elections in Boston, Moon Island came under the jurisdiction of the Town of Dorchester. In 1659, Moon Island was valued at twenty-eight pounds. Dorchester town records for show of April 3, 1638s an allotment of land being made to James Priest and Robert Elwell on "Manning's Moone"; and, according to the History of the Town of Dorchester, Capt. John Holland's will left "Munning's Moone" to his oldest son in 1652. The island was eventually sold to Henry Ashhurst.

During 1775, armed British barges chased a Colonial raiding party from Long Island to Dorchester. One American soldier was killed on Moon Island. There is a 1776 reference to a Moon Island Redoubt fortification that was authorized. However, there is no evidence that it ever had been constructed.

In 1850, Boston's first comprehensive public report blamed poor sanitary conditions for the high mortality rates among immigrants. The report recommended collecting the sewage instead of allowing it to drain into Boston Harbor. At this time, Boston's sewage was discharged into drains along the streets of Boston directly from residences and buildings. These drains discharged directly into local streams, bays, and from docks, polluting the harbor waters, poisoning the air, and leaving effluent on mud flats that surrounded Boston. On warm summer days, the odors from these flats became unbearable. Affluent Bostonians left Boston during the summer months for their summer residences on the North Shore.

In 1878, the Massachusetts State Legislature approved the construction of the Boston Main Drainage System, which was supposed to handle the sewage from 18 cities and towns by pumping it to Moon Island for storage and release into Quincy Bay on the outgoing tides.

The City of Boston began construction of a large 7.5-foot (2.3 m) diameter brick sewer conduit from Old Harbor Point (Columbia Point) under Dorchester Bay to Squantum and out to Moon Island under a causeway. The shaft is 150 feet (46 m) below ground and a mile and a half in length. It took 5 million bricks and 8,000 barrels (1,300 m^{3}) of cement to complete the pipe.

There is a brick building located at the end of the University of Massachusetts Boston campus facing Squantum. This is the location of the sewer system's pump house, known as the Calf Pasture Pumping Station Complex, which was named for the marshy area known as the Dorchester Calf Pasture at that time. Initially, this area was a long narrow land-filled peninsula but has been subsequently expanded many times to accommodate development.

Exiting the tunnel, the sewage was pumped through Squantum Neck and reached holding tanks on Moon Island through another conduit placed under the embankment from Squantum to Moon Island. The sand and gravel needed to complete this project was stripped from Half Moon Island, a crescent-shaped island that was located near the mouth of Black's Creek in Quincy Bay. Four huge cut-granite storage tanks with a 50-million-US-gallon (190,000 m^{3}) capacity were built by the Cape Ann Granite Company to handle the sewage. These vats were formed by digging out the northern section of the hill and cementing and bricking the sides of the excavation. This reservoir was divided into four compartments, each with inlets and four outlets. The tanks were 900 by 150 feet (46 m) and 17 feet (5.2 m) deep. The bottoms were seven feet thick and were grooved to ease the removal of sludge. At one end was a gatehouse. The tank outlets were connected with a power pump and a turbine that was used to open the gates of the outflow pipe. The 12-foot (3.7 m) diameter outflow conduit extended 600 feet (180 m) into the harbor from the northern end of Moon Island. The Sewage Plant was completed in 1884 at a cost of $6-million.

The original operating plan was to collect the raw sewage in the four storage tanks during times of high water and, then, two hours after the start of ebb tide, the sewage would be discharged into the harbor. This allowed approximately four hours until slack water. The total outflow time was three to four hours per cycle or six to eight hours per 24-hour period. Boston Harbor normally has two tide and current cycles each day. The expectation was that the effluent would flow between Long and Rainsford Islands, through a small gut between Gallops and Georges Island, then out through Black Rock Channel and Nantasket Roads.

As time passed, the population of Boston expanded and additional communities were added to the system. The discharge of sewage at Moon Island required longer and longer outflow periods. The situation worsened until the incoming tides distributed the unprocessed sewage throughout the sand flats and beaches of Boston Harbor and Quincy Bay.

In 1889, The Metropolitan Sewerage District (MSD) was formed to build one of the first regional sewer systems in the United States. The system continued to expand through the early 20th century. The Moon Island system provided no treatment capability. It merely collected waste water and effluent, and pumped it out into Boston Harbor.

During 1892, a garbage reclaiming plant was established on Moon Island. The plant was moved to Spectacle Island during 1912. By 1919, severe pollution from the Moon Island sewage outflow caused the closing of many of the clam beds and beaches in Boston Harbor and Quincy Bay. Also during this year, the Metropolitan District Commission (MDC) took over control of the Moon Island/Squantum Sewer System from the MSD. In 1933, the pollution of Boston Harbor worsened to the point that all clams taken in the area required purification processing before sale or consumption. Pollution on the Boston and Quincy beaches worsened.

In 1939, a legislature committee found that Quincy Bay and Hingham Harbor were "revolting" and "in violation of all public health requirements." Both Boston and Quincy beaches have been closed since 1890. More than 250 million US gallons (950,000 m^{3}) of raw sewage were being dumped into Boston Harbor daily. The following year, Massachusetts State planners recommended the construction of sewage treatment plants at Moon Island, Deer Island, and Nut Island in Quincy.

On August 4, 1951, then Secretary of Labor, Maurice J. Tobin, dedicated the two-lane steel bridge from Moon Head to Long Island.

In 1959, The Boston Fire Department constructed a fire-fighting training facility at the northern end of Moon Island. A concrete building was designed and built to simulate the various roof designs and window shapes found in the City of Boston.

In 1960, the Boston Police Department established an outdoor pistol range on the southern side of Moon Island. This facility is now jointly used by the Boston and Quincy Police Departments.

A cache of stone blades were found on a Squantum beach in 1961. These artifacts belonged to the early Indians who lived in the Squantum area.

The Moon Island sewage facility was still operating in 1967, pumping about a million gallons of sewage into Boston Harbor. 15–20% of the sludge that was discharged with the outgoing tides returned on the next incoming tide. The result was that Boston Harbor and Quincy Bay became severely polluted.

With the opening of the Deer Island sewage treatment plant in 1968, the discharge of sewage from the Moon Island facility was put on emergency standby status and the flow of the sewage to Moon Island was diverted to Deer Island.

The Squantum Naval Air Station in Squantum was abandoned and in ruins by 1970. Also during this year, the skeleton of a dog was found below a heap of shells in Squantum. The dog's remains were carbon dated to 300 AD. The remains of a few native Indians have also been discovered nearby. The sachem Chickataubut had his summer home at Moswetuset Hummock in the early 17th century.

In 1972, federal and state laws mandated primary and secondary treatment for all municipal sewer systems, effectively taking the option for lesser treatment plants away from states.

In 1984, due to the extensive pollution on Quincy's beaches, the City of Quincy filed a lawsuit in state court against the MDC. As a result, the Massachusetts Water Resources Authority (MWRA) was created to manage the cleanup of Boston Harbor. Judge Troy made a judicial decision that prohibited the attachment of any new buildings or homes to the existing sewer system until a plan was established to solve the sewerage overflow problem in Boston Harbor. In 1985, the MWRA assumed control of all of the MDCs water and sewer systems. Because these systems were below federal standards, a federal court order mandated the construction of a new waste water treatment plant on Deer Island.

In 1993, National Guard bulldozers, with little public notice, began clearing the woods on Moon Island for a firing range that was planned to have lights for night shooting. Outraged local Squantum residents feared that the increased shooting on Moon Island would endanger them or even passing boat operators. The Seaside Environmental Alliance claimed the Boston Plan was a ruse, indicating that this expansion would affect the plans for any use of Moon Island by the general public. The public continues to be banned from both Moon and Long Islands.

In 1996, the Boston Globe reported that Mayor Tom Menino and MIT engineer Clifford Goudey were planning a program to revitalize the aquaculture system in Boston Harbor and use the great tanks on Moon Island as a fish farm or a temporary home for tuna or lobster. The prices of both these fish types vary by season. The plan was to collect and store fish in the tanks and sell the fish at higher prices when they were out of season. Nothing has come of this plan to date.

Today, Moon Island remains closed to the general public and is still owned by the City of Boston. With the cessation of sewage discharge, the waters around the island have become a prime fishing resource. However, access is limited to private boat. The lagoon on the northwest of Moon Island formed by the Moon Island causeway, Squantum and Thompson Island has become an anchorage for private boats, providing protection from the boat wakes in Dorchester Bay and Western Way.

== Current occupants ==
All land on Moon Island is owned by the City of Boston, but the island is under the jurisdiction of Quincy. Current occupants include:

- Boston Police Department firing range
- Boston Fire Department training facility
