= Long Island Bridge =

Defunct bridge in Boston harbor

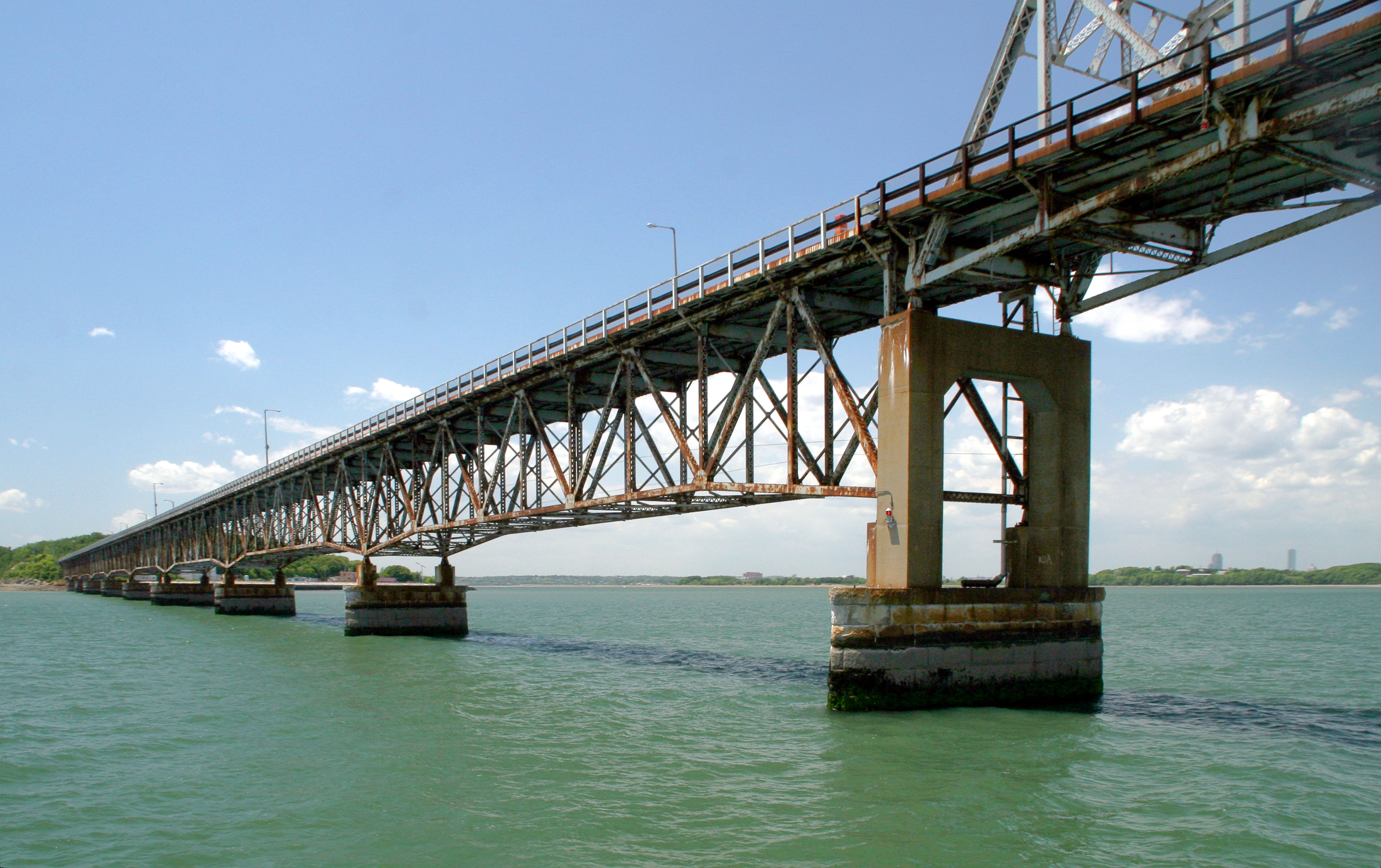
- Long Island Bridge in May 2009
- Coordinates: 42°19′N 70°59′W
- Crosses: Boston Harbor
- Locale: Boston, Massachusetts and Quincy, Massachusetts
- Other name: Long Island Viaduct
- Owner: City of Boston

Characteristics
- Design: Warren truss
- Material: Steel, concrete and rebar
- Total length: 3,450 ft (1,051.6 m)
- Width: 30.0 ft

History
- Designer: Crandall Engineering Company
- Constructed by: Bethlehem Steel Corporation
- Construction start: 1950
- Construction end: 1951
- Opened: August 4, 1951; 74 years ago
- Closed: October 8, 2014 (demolished 2015)
- Replaces: Ferry service

Location
- Interactive map of Long Island Bridge

The Long Island Bridge, sometimes referred to as the Long Island Viaduct, was a bridge in Boston, Massachusetts, that connected Long Island to Moon Island. Both islands are located in Boston Harbor and are connected to the mainland via a causeway from Moon Island to Squantum, a neighborhood of Quincy, Massachusetts.

== History ==
Constructed at a cost of $2,000,000, the bridge was opened on August 4, 1951. Before the bridge was opened, Long Island was accessible only by the ferry James M. Curley. The bridge was built to provide better access to Long Island Hospital, an infectious disease hospital serving 1,200 chronically ill patients. After the hospital's closure, in 1983, the bridge provided access to other city facilities on the island, including a homeless shelter, programs for patients with substance abuse problems, and a fire station.

A Fields Corner–Long Island bus service over the bridge was operated by the Eastern Massachusetts Street Railway until 1972, then by the MBTA until 1976. The MBTA resumed service with route 276 Long Island Hospital–Boston City Hospital in 1983, with route 275 added in 1994. After a weight restriction was placed on the bridge in 2007, the two routes terminated at the Fire Academy on Moon Island, with a single route 274 bus shuttling over the bridge.

=== Closure ===
The ruins of the Long Island Bridge in 2025

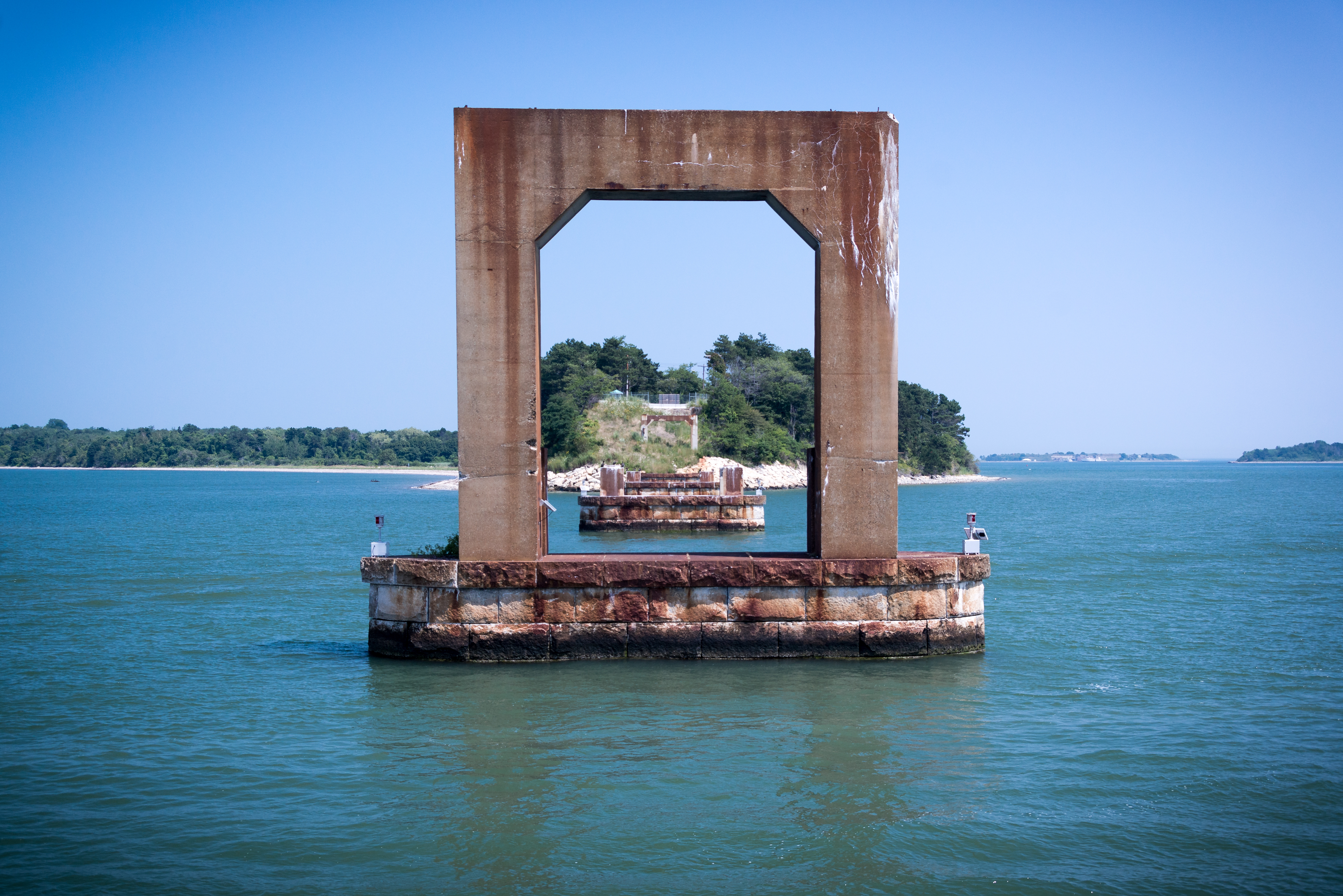
Support piers for former bridge in 2017

In October 2014, all access to Long Island was cut off for the indefinite future since the then Mayor of Boston, Marty Walsh, took the warning of the Massachusetts Department of Transportation about the condition of the Long Island Bridge being unsafe. All those living on Long Island and being serviced by recovery programs or as guests in the homeless shelter were no longer able to go there or use it for services. They were abruptly relocated elsewhere on an emergency basis.

In January 2015, demolition of the bridge began with the central span section being removed and ferried away in February. In a series of controlled demolitions, the remainder of the bridge spans were destroyed in March and April, though the foundations remain. By 2018, the city had committed $92 million to replace the bridge, but Quincy objected to the planned replacement. In July 2022, the Massachusetts Supreme Judicial Court ruled that the Quincy Conservation Commission, which had rejected Boston's plans for the new bridge, did not have jurisdiction to overrule the Massachusetts Department of Environmental Protection approval of the plan.

== See also ==
- Mass & Cass
