= Nixes Mate =

Island in Boston Harbor, Massachusetts

Nix's Mate Daybeacon
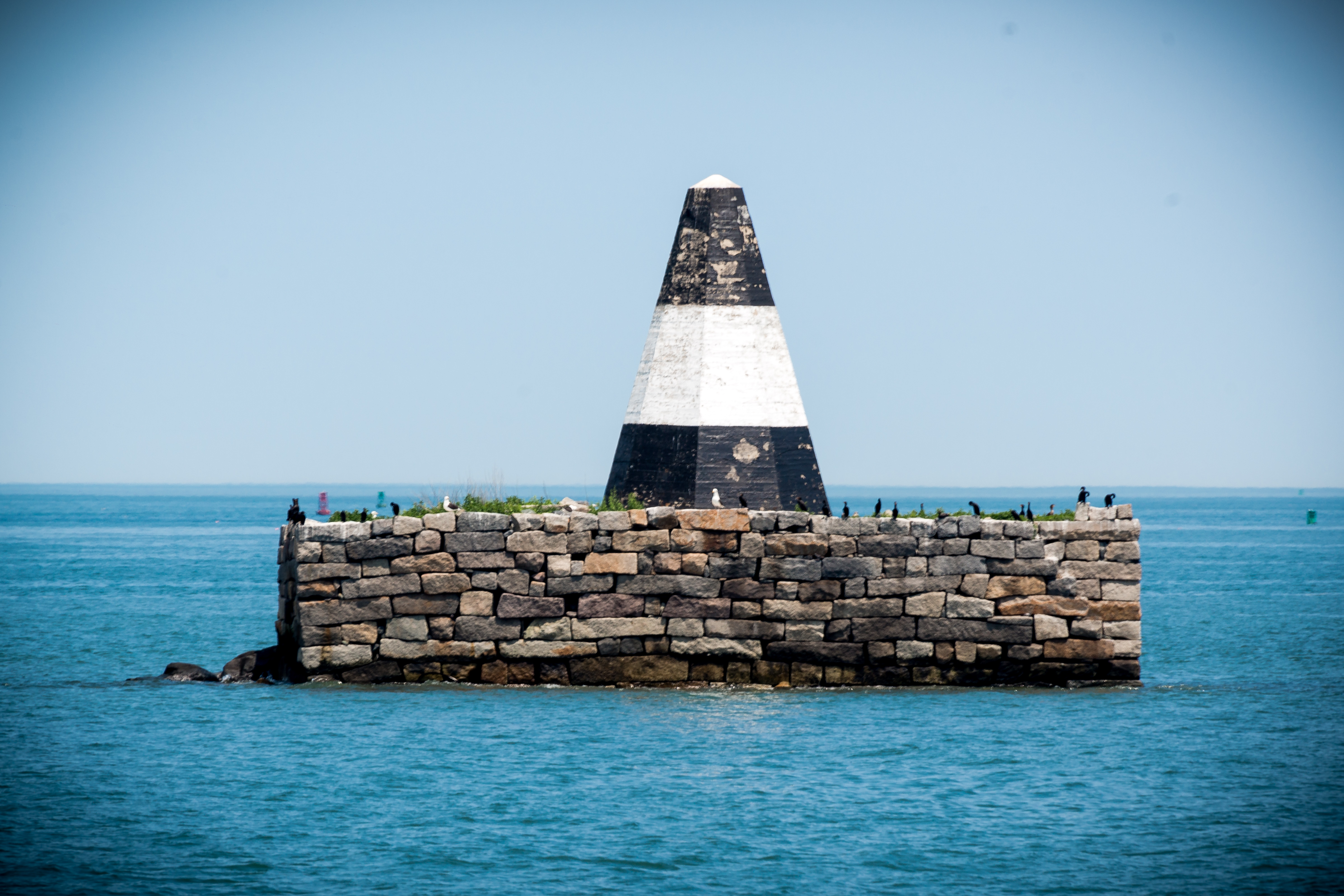
- Location: Nixes Mate, Boston, United States
- Coordinates: 42°19′55″N 70°56′38″W
- Constructed: 1834
- Construction: granite (foundation), wood (beacon), concrete (coating)
- Height: 20 ft (6.1 m)
- Markings: Black and white
- Heritage: National Register of Historic Places listed place
- Nix's Mate Daybeacon
- U.S. National Register of Historic Places
- Area: less than one acre
- NRHP reference No.: 04000189
- Added to NRHP: March 18, 2004

Nixes Mate, also known as Nixes Island, Nix's Mate and Nick's Mate, is one of the smaller islands in the Boston Harbor Islands National Recreation Area. Located in Boston Harbor's outer limits near the convergence of three major channels, the island lies about 5 nautical miles (9.3 km; 5.8 mi) from downtown Boston and about 0.6 nautical miles (1.1 km; 0.69 mi) east of Long Island Head Light. The island covers and uncovers with the tide and is not open to the public. It is described in the Light List as "Nixes Mate: black, white band midway of height, octagonal pyramid on square granite base", Light List number 1-11450.

== Description ==
The island features a prominent black and white stucco-covered wood pyramidal daybeacon, or channel marker, resting atop a granite base erected by the Boston Marine Society in 1805. Reaching a height of approximately 20 feet (6.1 m), the beacon serves as a Federal aide to navigation, warning passing ships of one of the harbor's most hazardous shoals. Originally sheathed in slate shingles, the pyramid likely received its concrete coating some time between World War I and World War II. A granite block stairway accesses the pyramid at the base's south side. The pyramid's hollow innards comprise a mortise-and-tenon wood structural system supported by cross-members radiating from a central column.

== History ==
In 1636, Nix's Mate was granted to John Gallop, a harbor pilot who lived on nearby Gallops Island and used the then 12-acre (4.9 ha) island for grazing his sheep. Ship's ballast was quarried from the island during the 17th century, followed by slate in the 18th century, resulting in today's much smaller island. In 1726, upon the arrest of pirate Captain William Fly, officials brought him to Boston where he was executed. His body was then gibbetted on Nixes Mate to serve as a warning to sailors not to turn to piracy. Before Fly's execution, he famously scolded the hangman for incorrectly securing his noose, then re-tied it himself. His body, as well as those of two other pirates, is buried on the island.

=== Construction ===
Recognizing the hazard the gradually disappearing island posed to harbor navigation, the Boston Marine Society appealed to Congress to construct a stone wall for a warning beacon around the island's remains in December 1803. With no action from Congress the Commonwealth of Massachusetts purchased the island and authorized $3,000 in state funds for the building of the wall and the beacon. By 1832, the U.S. government purchased the island and started to build the stone platform and wood pyramid, which was struck by lightning and burned in 1841, then reconstructed.

=== Restoration ===
By 2001, the daybeacon was in poor condition. The Coast Guard, which is responsible for it, announced that it would be replaced, but following public outcry they rebuilt it instead, in 2003. Nixes Mate was added to the National Register of Historic Places as Nix's Mate Daybeacon on March 18, 2004, reference number 04000189.

=== Recent history ===
On August 25, 2012, the Provincetown III ran aground on Nixes Mate while ferrying 145 passengers from Boston to Provincetown. No injuries were reported.

== See also ==
- National Register of Historic Places listings in southern Boston, Massachusetts
