= Boston Marine Society =

Charitable organization

Coordinates: 42°22′29.46″N 71°3′17.92″W

The Boston Marine Society (established 1742) is a charitable organization in Boston, Massachusetts, formed "to 'make navigation more safe' and to relieve members and their families in poverty or other 'adverse accidents in life.'" Membership generally consists of current and former ship captains. The society provides financial support to members and their families in times of need; and also actively advises on maritime navigational safety such as the placement of lighthouses and buoys, and selection of Boston Harbor pilots.

== Brief history ==
The society first formed as a fellowship in 1742, and officially incorporated in 1754. Founders included William Starkey, Edward Cahill, Isaac Freeman, Richard Humphreys, Edward Freyer, Moses Bennet, Jonathan Clarke, John Cullum, Joseph Prince, and Abraham Remmick. In its first century the society conducted meetings at the Concert Hall, Bunch-of-Grapes tavern, and the Sun Tavern. In 1851 it kept an office on Commercial Street and later in the Merchants Exchange. Since the 1980s it has operated from offices in the Boston Navy Yard.

According to maritime historian Samuel Eliot Morison, the society's meetings "were common ground where all Bostonians interested in seaborne commerce met. The secretary describes it in 1811 as 'composed of upwards of 100 former shipmasters who have retired from sea with adequate fortunes, many of whom are largely interested in the insurance offices and as underwriters, and about 50 of the most respectable merchants and shipowners and gentlemen of the highest stations in the commonwealth. The rest of the Society is composed of the more active and younger mariners who still follow the seas as a professional business.' These last were the men who made the name of Boston famous from Archangel to Smyrna, and east by west to the River Plate and Calcutta."

=== Navigation safety ===
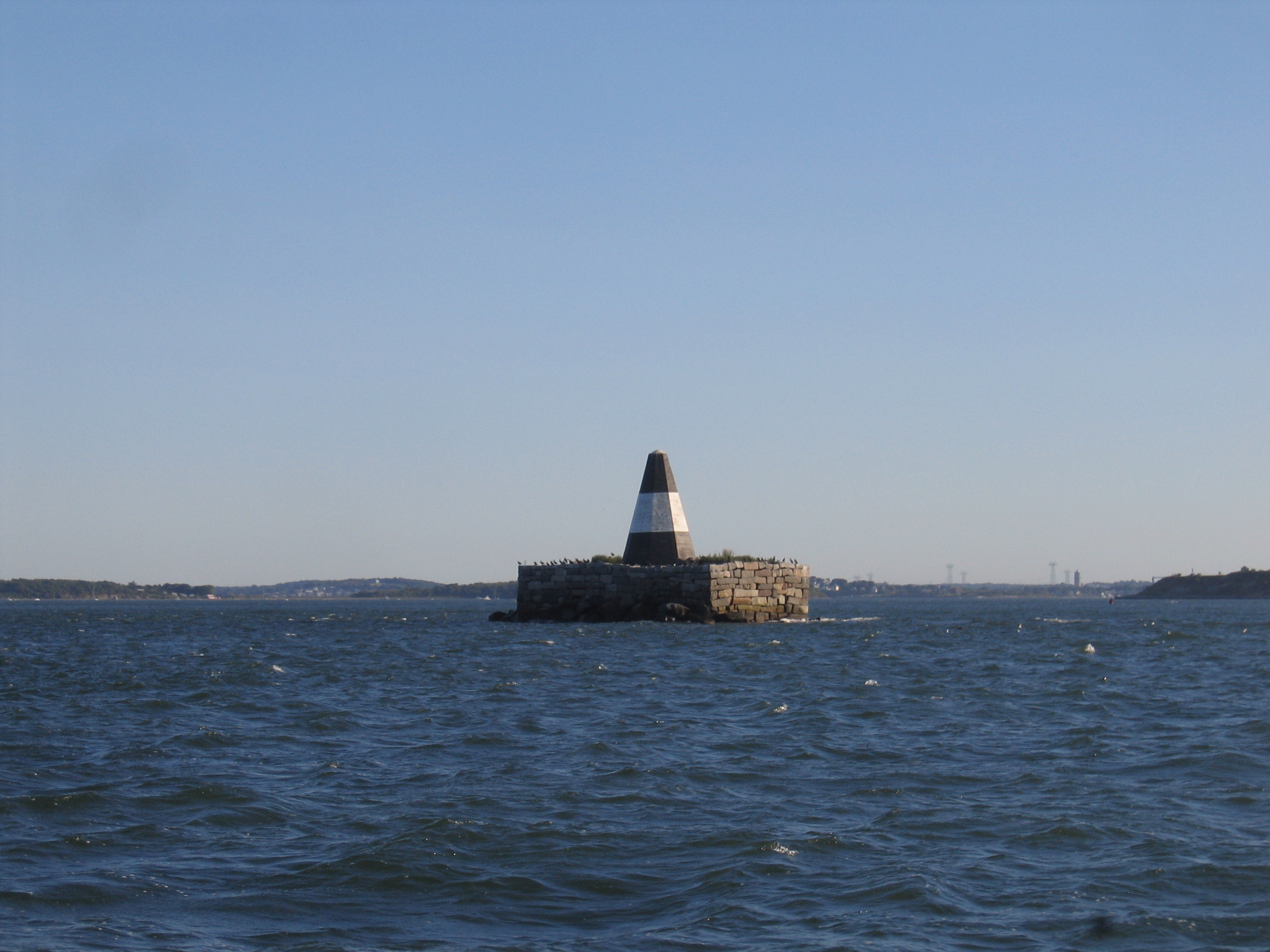
Nixes Mate

The society has borne responsibility for safe pilotage in the Boston Harbor since the 18th century. "Beginning in 1791 and continuing through the present, the society through its trustees is vested with the authority to appoint Pilot Commissioners, who in turn appoint Boston Harbor pilots." It has also published guides such as the 1832 Rules and Regulations for the Pilotage of the Harbor of Boston.

Along with others, the society caused the creation of the Cape Cod Light in 1797. In 1805 the society built the current granite base of the beacon on Nixes Mate in Boston Harbor. The society also produced studies including one that led to the building of Long Island Head Light in 1819.

Among the society's many accomplishments in the area of navigation safety are the publication in 1768 of Directions for Sailing in and out of Plymouth Harbour (issued in connection with the building of Plymouth Light in that year); the production in 1790 of charts of the coast of North America; and the 1797 publication of Directions for Sailing by Cape-Cod Light-House.

=== Other activities ===
In addition to maritime safety, the society has devoted itself to collection and distribution of funds to aid members and their families in times of financial need.

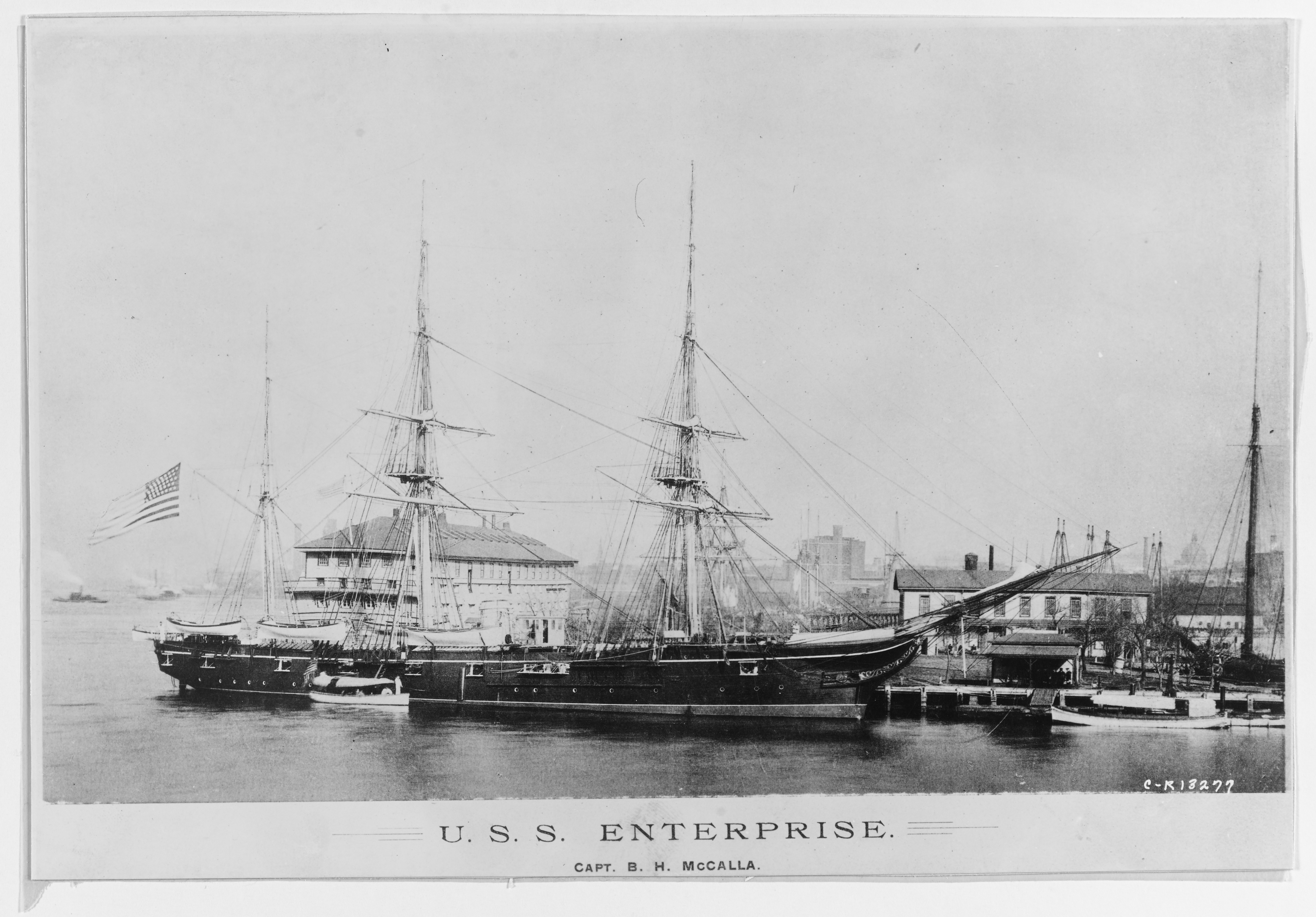
USS Enterprise

The society has also hosted a number of lectures. In the 19th century speakers included John Pickering (on "telegraphic language") and Robert Bennet Forbes.

In 1893 the society began supervising "the operation of school ships Enterprise (1892-1909) and her successor Nantucket (1909-1917, 1921-1940)," affiliated with the Massachusetts Nautical Training School.

As a focal point for seafaring in general the society has stewarded donations of model ships, telescopes, paintings, scrimshaw, and travel souvenirs. Visitors to the society's present-day quarters in Charlestown may view some of these objects on display.

=== Members and officers ===
Members in the 18th century included William Furness, Daniel Malcom, John Foster Williams, James Magee; 18th-century presidents included Thomas Dennie and Mungo Mackay. Among the members in the 19th century: J.D. Farrell, F.W. Macondray, and Daniel McLaughlin. In the heyday of the clipper ship "many were captained or owned by such society members as Bacon, Eldridge, Emmons, Forbes, Glidden, Howes, Lodge, Ropes, Upton, Wales, Watkins and Weld." Some of the 19th-century presidents were Jonathan Chapman, Eben Davis, Charles Emery, Luther Fisk, Robert Bennett Forbes, William Humphrey, James P. Martin, William F. Sturgis, and Israel Whitney. Members and officers in recent years include William A. Baker, Barry Clifford, William M. Fowler, Jr., and Soren Willensen.
