= Fort Strong =

Historic fort in the United States

- Part of Harbor Defenses of Boston
- Long Island, Massachusetts
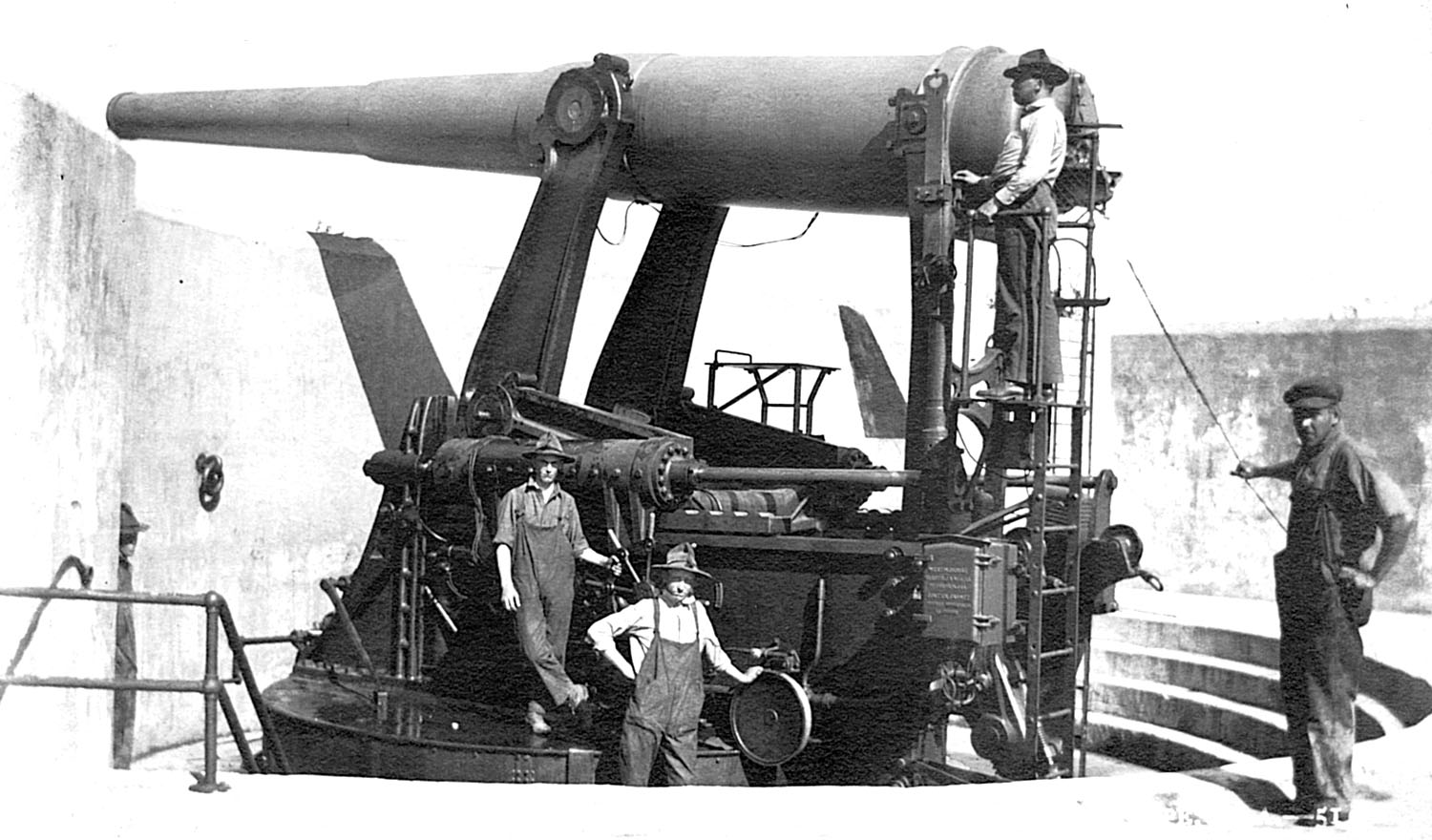
- A 10-inch disappearing gun, similar to those of Batteries Hitchcock and Ward.

Site information
- Type: Coastal Defense
- Owner: Massachusetts
- Controlled by: City of Boston

Location
- Location in Massachusetts
- Coordinates: 42°19′47.96″N 70°57′21.53″W

Site history
- Built: 1899
- Built by: United States Army
- In use: 1899-1961
- Battles/wars: World War I World War II; Cold War

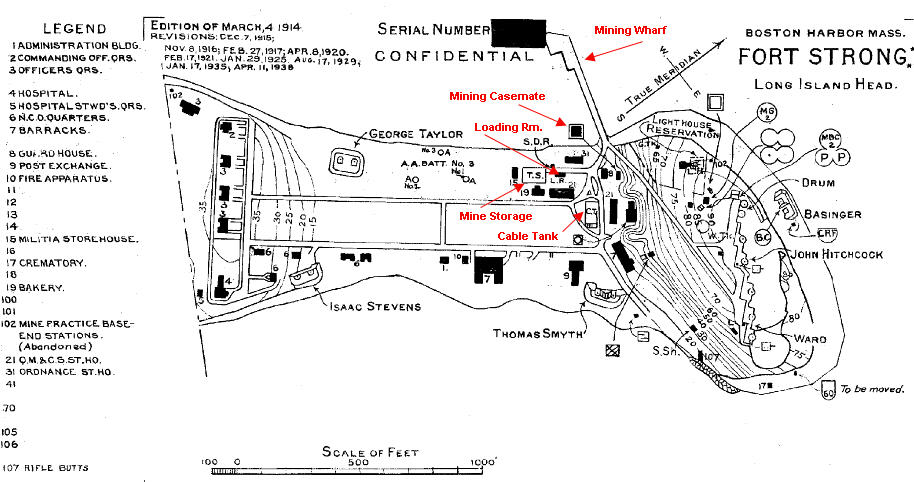
A 1938 map of the fort.

Fort Strong is a former U.S. Army Coast Artillery fort that occupied the northern third of Long Island in the Boston Harbor. The island had a training camp during the American Civil War, and a gun battery was built there in the 1870s. The fort was built in 1893-1906 during the Endicott period of expansion in U.S. coast defense, and was part of the Coast (later Harbor) Defenses of Boston. Formerly, it was also known as Long Island Military Reservation. Before World War I, a large station for handling submarine mines was added to the fort's defenses. Prior to World War I the fort was probably manned by over 1,000 soldiers. During World War II, two batteries of 3-inch guns (Basinger and Stevens) defended channel minefields, but the big guns and other 3-inch batteries (except for the AA guns) were decommissioned. Declared surplus in 1947, the fort served as a Nike missile site until 1961, and was redeveloped in 2005-2009 for a children's summer camp and later a homeless shelter. However, in 2014 the island's bridge was demolished due to safety concerns, and all activity ended.

== Origins ==
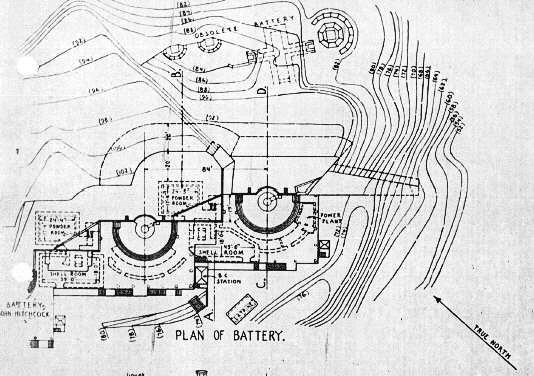
The "obsolete" (1874) cannon battery was included on a 1922 map of Battery Ward.

The fort had its origins in the Civil War period. Camp Wightman, a Civil War training camp, was located on the island in 1861. At the end of the Civil War, the state government decided to name a new battery on Long Island for the old Fort Strong, a Revolutionary War and War of 1812 earthwork which had been located in East Boston on Noddle's Island. The old fort and the Long Island Head Battery were named for Massachusetts Governor Caleb Strong, while the new fort was named for Major General George C. Strong in 1899. Until 1899, the fort was also named the Long Island Military Reservation. From 1874 to 1876, the fort had a battery of 10 cannon, called the Long Island Head Battery, on the northeast tip of the raised northern portion of the island. Remains of this battery can still be found, concealed by heavy brush, about 100 feet (30 m) north of Battery Ward, the easternmost concrete battery on the tip of the island (see the map of the "Obsolete Battery").

In 1893, as part of the Endicott Board's recommendations, construction began at the fort on a series of massive concrete gun batteries to defend the harbor approaches. A large barracks building for the soldiers and a series of quarters for officers and NCOs were also constructed, as well as structures for mining operations and support functions at the fort. The fort was named in General Order 134, 22 July 1899, for Brigadier General George Crockett Strong.

A quick look at the map will show how Fort Strong's central location made it so well suited for harbor defense. Its principal armament (the 10-inch guns) could engage any ship attempting to enter either the northern or southern approaches to the harbor, while its smaller rapid fire (3-inch) guns could fire directly over all approach channels and the mine fields that criss-crossed them.

== Modern Gun Batteries ==
The platform of 10-inch Gun #1, Battery Hitchcock.

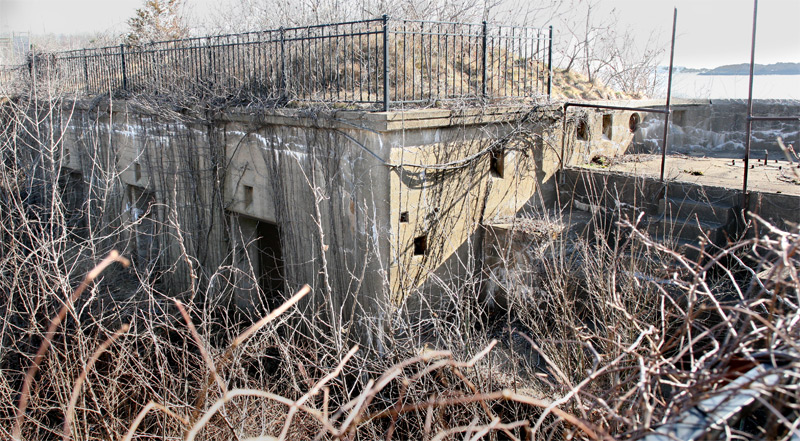
The casemate of Battery Smyth (3-inch guns).

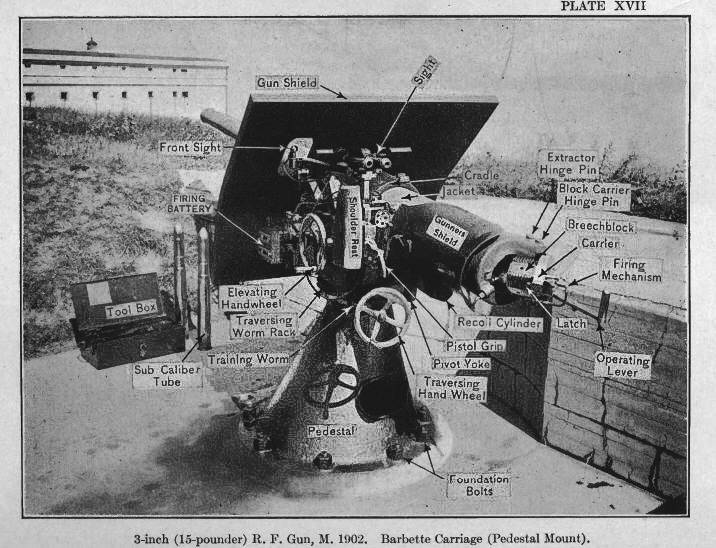
A 3-inch M1902 seacoast gun. All but one of Fort Strong's 3-inch batteries mounted this type of gun.

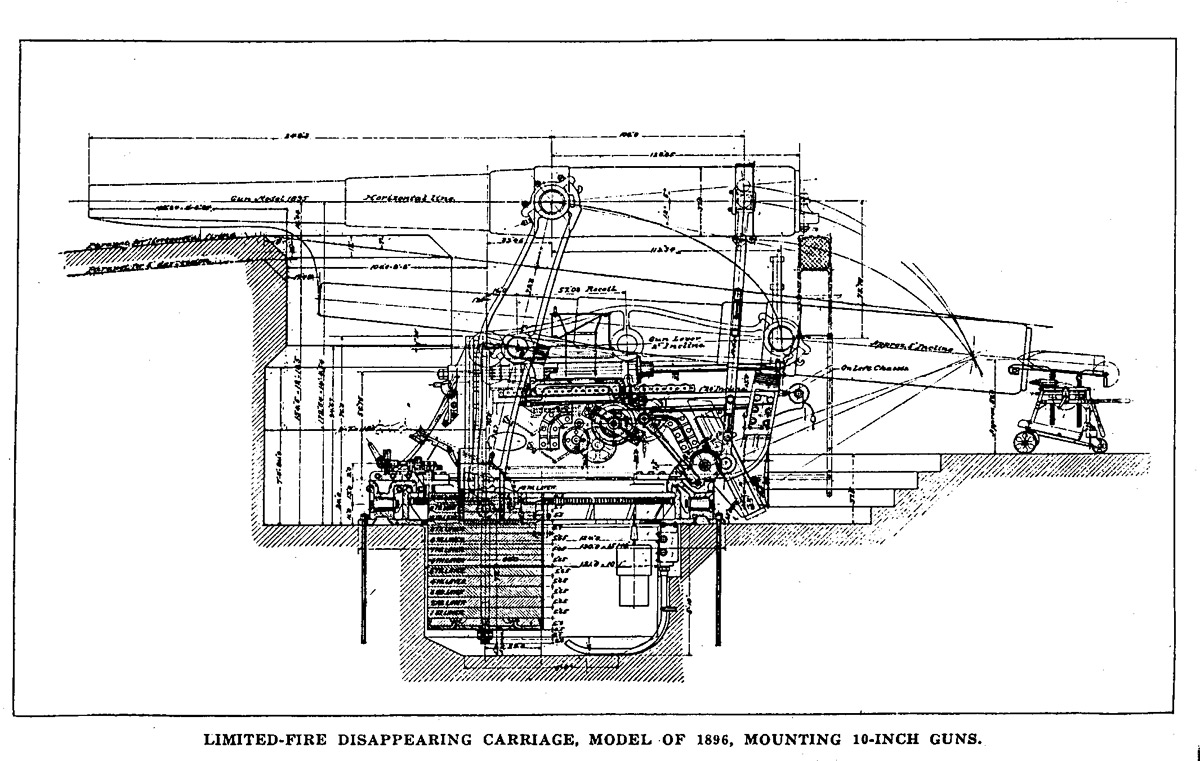
A cutaway drawing showing the workings of the disappearing carriage, M1896.

View of Deer Island and the channel from Battery Basinger.

The Endicott-era and later gun batteries at Fort Strong were:

Name	No. of guns	Gun type	Carriage type	Years active
Hitchcock	3	10-inch gun M1888	disappearing, 2 M1894, 1 M1896	1899-1939
Ward	2	10-inch gun M1888	disappearing M1894	1899-1939
Drum	2	4.72-inch/40 caliber Armstrong gun	pedestal	1899-1917
Basinger	2	3-inch gun M1898	masking parapet M1898	1906-1947
Smyth	2	3-inch gun M1902	pedestal	1906-1921
Stevens	2	3-inch gun M1902	pedestal	1906-1946
Taylor	2	3-inch gun M1902	pedestal	1906-1942

The main armament of Fort Strong was its two batteries of 10-inch guns on disappearing carriages, totaling five guns. Originally, two of these guns were located in Battery Ward, the easternmost concrete fortification on Long Island Head, and three more in Battery Hitchcock, immediately to its west. The construction of these batteries, begun in 1893, was completed in 1899. Electrically powered ammunition and powder hoists were added soon after. With a maximum range of 14,000 yards (13,000 m), or almost 8 miles, these guns covered an arc from Revere to North Scituate. The batteries were intended to engage medium and larger sized ships as directed by the fire control system.

Battery Drum, at the extreme northwestern end of the gun line on Long Island Head, mounted two 4.7-inch Armstrong guns on pedestal mounts. These were part of a series of batteries hastily ordered after the outbreak of the Spanish–American War in 1898. It was feared that the Spanish Navy would bombard the US east coast. Most Endicott batteries were still years from completion, especially the 3-inch and 6-inch batteries. Some 6-inch and 4.7-inch guns were purchased from the United Kingdom and mounted at the Endicott forts still under construction, including the two 4.7-inch guns at Fort Strong.

Fort Strong also had four batteries of 3-inch rapid fire guns, with two guns each (or 8 guns total). Battery Basinger (with two 3-inch M1898 guns) was completed in 1901, the remainder (each with two 3-inch M1902 guns) were completed in 1906. These guns were meant to engage faster moving targets by means of direct fire, and were sited to protect the mine fields that had been laid to block the harbor channels. They could deliver fire up to a range of 11,000 yards (10,000 m), or 6.25 miles. Battery Stevens and Battery Smyth were located on the southeast side of the fort, looking out over the channel between Long Island and Hull. Battery Taylor was on the southwest side, looking out toward Spectacle Island, and Battery Basinger was located on the northern tip of the fort (just downslope from the 10-inch gun batteries), looking across toward Fort Dawes on Deer Island.

The latter three of these batteries were located in classic Coast Artillery 3-inch gun emplacements, each with two raised gun platforms, one on either side of a large central casemated magazine. Battery Basinger, however, was squeezed into the narrow space above the sea wall, its gun platforms more like narrow tubs at the water's edge. This battery had a unique underground magazine with hand-operated chain hoists to serve ammunition to its two guns.

Each of the 10-inch guns was intended to be served by a full-strength complement of 43 enlisted men, so the five guns of the two batteries would have required a total of 215 crew. Manning the four 3-inch batteries (when all their guns were present) would have required roughly another 100 men in total. Add to this the mine and searchlight defenses, the maintenance and support functions of the fort, and its officer, and about 450 soldiers likely manned the fort, living in large barracks buildings and smaller houses that surrounded the parade ground.

== World War I through World War II ==
The American entry into World War I in early 1917 brought many changes at Fort Strong. In October 1917 the two 4.7-inch guns of Battery Drum were relocated to Sachuest Point in Middletown, Rhode Island. This is misspelled on the gun cards as "Sauchet Point". These guns were removed in 1919; one was scrapped and one remains as a memorial in Ansonia, Connecticut. All three guns of Battery Hitchcock were dismounted for potential service on the Western Front as railway artillery. In June 1918 one of these guns was shipped out for the railway gun program, but the other two were remounted. The transferred gun was never replaced. Also, a two-gun battery of Model 1917A2 3-in antiaircraft guns was constructed on the northwest side of the parade ground during 1917-18. In 1935, a third gun was added to this battery, which remained active through World War II.

In 1920-1921 the 3-inch M1898 Driggs-Seabury guns of Battery Basinger were removed and scrapped, part of a withdrawal from service of this type of weapon. The 3-inch M1902 guns of Battery Smyth were transferred to Battery Basinger; Battery Smyth was never re-armed.

In 1938-1939 all of Fort Strong's four remaining 10-inch guns were removed and scrapped. In 1942 Battery Taylor's two 3-inch guns (and name) were transferred to Fort Dawes on Deer Island. This left the four 3-inch guns of Batteries Basinger and Stevens and the 3-inch antiaircraft battery as Fort Strong's only armament.

During and for some period after World War II Fort Strong hosted an Army Intelligence Service post.

== Post World War II ==
In 1945-46 German rocket scientist Wernher von Braun and six others were secretly housed at the Army Intelligence Service post at Fort Strong.

In 1946 Fort Strong's remaining guns were scrapped. A radar site for the 90 mm antiaircraft gun system (Site B-35) was at the site 1952-1958. Fort Strong was a Nike missile launch site (B-37L) in the 1950s, with the control site in Squantum. The Radar Section, 15th Antiaircraft Artillery Group, was there from January 1958 to June 1961.

The property to the south of the fort was at one time the Long Island State Hospital, and is now operated by the Boston Public Health Commission.

In 2014 the bridge to Long Island was demolished due to safety concerns and all activities there ceased. In 2016 an organic farm was restarted on the island by a local fast food chain.

== In popular culture ==
Fort Strong makes in appearance in Fallout 4 (2015); specifically, a mission is given to the player character by the Brotherhood of Steel to clear Fort Strong.

== See also ==
- 9th Coast Artillery (United States)
- 241st Coast Artillery (United States)
- Seacoast defense in the United States
- United States Army Coast Artillery Corps
- List of military installations in Massachusetts
