= Boston Trust Act =

Boston city ordinance

The Boston Trust Act is a city ordinance in Boston, adopted in 2014 and amended in 2019, which orders Boston Police Department not to detain immigrants for potential deportation unless a criminal arrest warrant had been issued for them. It has often been described as a "sanctuary city" ordinance. The ordinance prohibits the police from collaborating with the Removal Operations department of U.S. Immigration and Customs Enforcement (ICE) on civil immigration enforcement and removal; but still permits the police to fully collaborate with the Homeland Security Investigations department of ICE on criminal and public safety matters.

The Second Trump Administration (which began in 2025) has taken direct issue with the Boston Trust Act. On September 4, 2025, a lawsuit claiming it was a violation of public law was filed United States Department of Justice under the direction of U.S. Attorney General Pam Bondi in the United States District Court for the District of Massachusetts. Named as defendants in the suit filing are the City of Boston, Boston Mayor Michelle Wu, the Boston Police Department, and Boston Police Commissioner Michael Cox.

== Description of ordinance ==
The Boston Trust Act is a municipal ordinance which orders Boston Police Department not to detain immigrants for potential deportation unless a criminal arrest warrant had been issued for them. This marked a shift away from the Secure Communities program the city up until then been a party to since 2006, in which it had actively collaborate with federal immigration officials in detecting criminals illegally in the United States and deport them, and routinely share the department's arrest fingerprints database with immigration officials. Proponents of the Boston Trust Act argued that it would improve relations between immigrant communities and the local police, making immigrant communities more likely to report local crimes to police and to cooperate with police efforts.

The ordinance prohibits the city's police from working with the Enforcement and Removal Operations department of U.S. Immigration and Customs Enforcement (ICE) on civil immigration enforcement efforts; but still permits the police to fully collaborate with the Homeland Security Investigations department of ICE on enforcement efforts related to criminal and public safety issues such as human trafficking, drug trafficking, and weapons trafficking.

The act was sponsored by City Councilor Josh Zakim. It was passed unanimously by the Boston City Council and signed into law by Mayor Marty Walsh in 2014. Among the councilors in the unanimous vote to adopt the ordinance was Michelle Wu, who was later elected mayor in 2021.

During the first Trump administration, Mayor Walsh affirmed his support for the policy. The act was amended in 2019. In December 2024, the Boston City Council adopted a resolution to reaffirm its support for the ordinance.

== Developments during the second Trump administration ==
Public dispute between the Trump presidential administration and the Boston mayoral administration of Michelle Wu in regards to the Boston Trust Act. Wu emerged as a perceived political adversary of the Trump administration and aligned Republican officials. The Second Trump administration have made so-called "sanctuary city" policies, such as the Boston Trust Act, a major target of its illegal immigration crackdown.

During the presidential transition that followed the 2024 presidential election, Mayor Wu publicly noted that the city's existing 2014 law limited the circumstances in which its police officers could cooperate with ICE agents. In response to this, Trump's designated border czar Tom Homan publicly criticized Wu as "not very smart." Wu responded to this,

People can say whatever they want about me. This isn’t about me. Our public safety record speaks for itself. We are the safest major city in America, here in Boston. And it’s because of the work that’s put in every day to build trust between our residents and law enforcement, and it’s because of our focus on making sure we are there when residents need us.

Weeks into the second Trump administration, at the February 2025 Conservative Political Action Conference, Homan responded to an earlier news interview by Boston Police Commissioner Cox regarding the city's policies by threatening that the federal government would be "bringing hell" to the city of Boston. Afterwards, Wu posted on social media to express her confidence in Commissioner Cox.

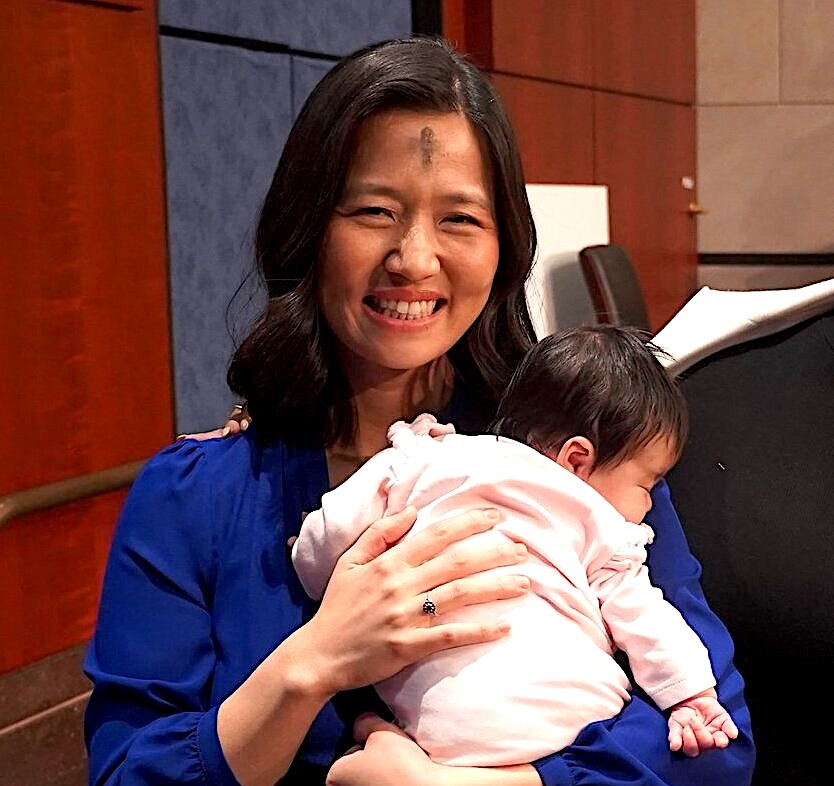
Wu holding her infant daughter in a hearing room on the day of her March 5, 2025, congressional testimony (Wu, a Catholic, had ash on her forehead due to her observance of the coinciding holiday of Ash Wednesday)

In March 2025, Wu complied with a congressional subpoena and testified before the House Committee on Oversight and Government Reform in hearings about major "sanctuary city" policies and cooperation with federal immigration authorities. The hearings featured several other mayors of large American cities. John L. Milcek of MassLive described Wu's performance in the more than five hours of hearings as a "star turn" for her, writing, "the Democratic mayor deftly parried jibes from Republicans who sounded like they’d never set foot in Boston". Sri Taylor of Bloomberg News described the hearing as having carried "high stakes" for Wu, and credited her performance in the hearing with having garnering her a "newfound role as both a favorite foil for Republican critics in Washington and a capable messenger for Democrats," noting that while Republicans on the committee had hoped to hurt Wu's reputation in the hearings, "It was Wu who walked away with a series of sound bites defending Boston and Democrat priorities that made the rounds on social media and bolstered her national presence." After the hearings, tension between the Trump presidential administration and Wu mayoral administration on this issue continued grow.

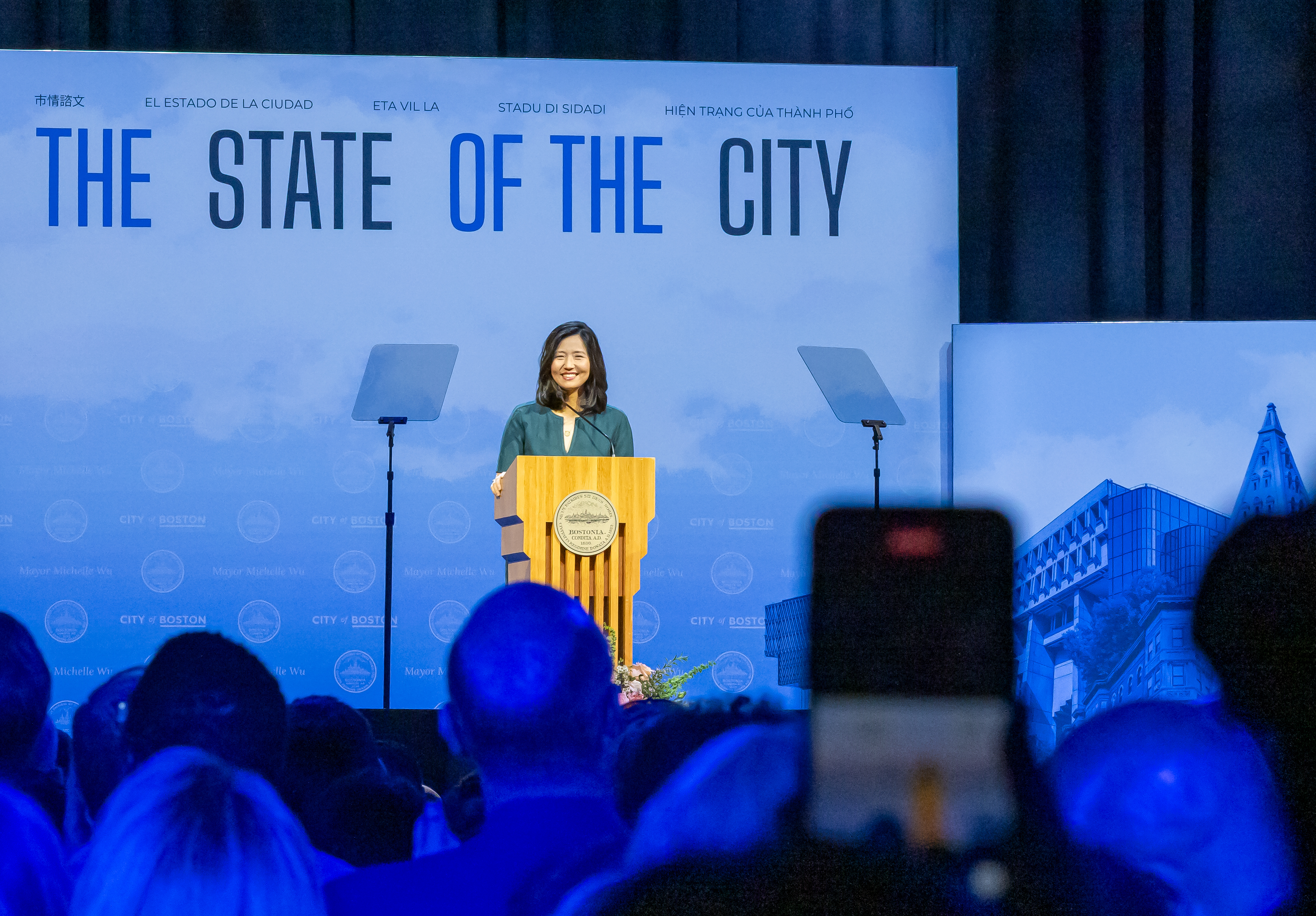
Wu delivering her 2025 State of the City address

New York Times and The Boston Globe observed that the city of Boston, Mayor Wu, and the Boston Trust Act developed into significant targets of the Trump administration's ire. On March 17, during her annual "State of the City" address, Wu countered Trump's rhetoric towards Boston and its immigration policies. The speech was described as "politically defiant and nationally attention-grabbing", and elicited the Trump White House's press office to publish an official response statement. In late-March, she made an interview appearance on The Daily Show and remarked that Boston's strong safety record was due to Boston being made "safe for everyone", explaining,

In a community [like Boston] where over a quarter of your residents were born in another country, if people are afraid to drop their kids off at school or call 911 when they need help or share information when they actually have information to report about a crime that happened, that makes everyone less safe...So [Boston is] really focused on being that home for everyone.

In June, U.S. Attorney General Pam Bondi sent Wu and mayors of 31 other cities letters demanding they end "sanctuary city" policies or face loss of federal funding and potential legal action. Wu responded with letter and press conference in which she defended the city's policies, crediting them with building trust between local law enforcement and communities that she asserted has been integral to partnerships that have made Boston "safe and welcoming".

A poll conducted by Emerson College Polling September 2–3 (immediately before the United States v. Boston lawsuit was filed) of likely Boston mayoral election voters found 67% approval and 23% disapproval for Wu's decision to refuse to abandon the city's sanctuary city policy. Approval for this decision was marginally higher than Wu's overall job performance approval (66% approval and 24% disapproval). On September 9, 2025 (days after the filing of the lawsuit and amid the federal government's focus on her administration's enforcement of the ordinance), Wu secured a landslide vote share in the preliminary round of Boston's mayoral election.

=== United States v. Boston lawsuit ===
United States v. Boston
- Court: United States District Court for the District of Massachusetts
- Full case name: The United States of America v. The City of Boston; Michelle Wu, Mayor of the City of Boston, in her Official Capacity; Boston Police Department; Michael A. Cox, Police Commissioner, in his Official Capacity

On September 4, 2025, Attorney General Bondi filed a lawsuit in the United States District Court for the District of Massachusetts against the City of Boston and Boston Police Department (additionally naming Mayor Wu and the Boston Police Department and its commissioner, Michael Cox, as defendants) arguing that the city's continued adherence to the Boston Trust Act was a violation of federal law. The lawsuit characterizes the policy as "obstructionist", and alleges it interferes with federal immigration enforcement.

The city has motioned for the case to be dismissed, asserting that the municipal policy is not in conflict with federal law.

==== Reactions from lawmakers and officials ====
Mayor Wu reacted to the lawsuit by declaring that Boston, "will not back down" in the face of federal pressure by the Trump administration. She further accused the Trump administration of attempting to impose an "authoritarian agenda", accused Trump of "attacking cities to hide his administration's failures", and defended Boston's law enforcement policies as making it the safest major city in the United States.

Massachusetts Democrats by large criticized the lawsuit. U.S. Senator from Massachusetts Elizabeth Warren (a former law professor) called the lawsuit an, "unconstitutional authoritarian power grab." Massachusetts Attorney General Andrea Campbell called the suit "baseless" and argued it was an effort "to rope local governments" into participating in what she called a "cruel immigration crackdown" by the Trump administration.

Massachusetts Republican Party Chair Amy Carnevale argued that the lawsuit held merit.

==== Analysis ====
Prominent attorney Nick Akerman opined that Boston had been acting within its legal rights, and predicted that the lawsuit would be dismissed just as an earlier lawsuit against Chicago's sanctuary city policy had also been dismissed. Carol Rose, executive director of the Massachusetts chapter of the ACLU, argued that the Boston government was acting within its rights by refusing to participate in the Trump administration's immigration actions, commenting,

[Local governments] can't interfere [with immigration enforcement], but they can't be commandeered by the federal government to do things that violate our local laws...That's what [the Trump administration are] trying to do, and that's not allowed under the Constitution — under the 10th Amendment of the Constitution.

James Pindell of The Boston Globe opined that the government's case against the city seemed unlikely to prevail, and the suit seemed more likely intended to generate headlines against Wu. Liberal writer Charles P. Pierce of Esquire characterized the lawsuit as, "a ridiculous lawsuit targeting political officials that won't cooperate with a corrupt [federal] government."
