= Michelle Wu =

Mayor of Boston since 2021

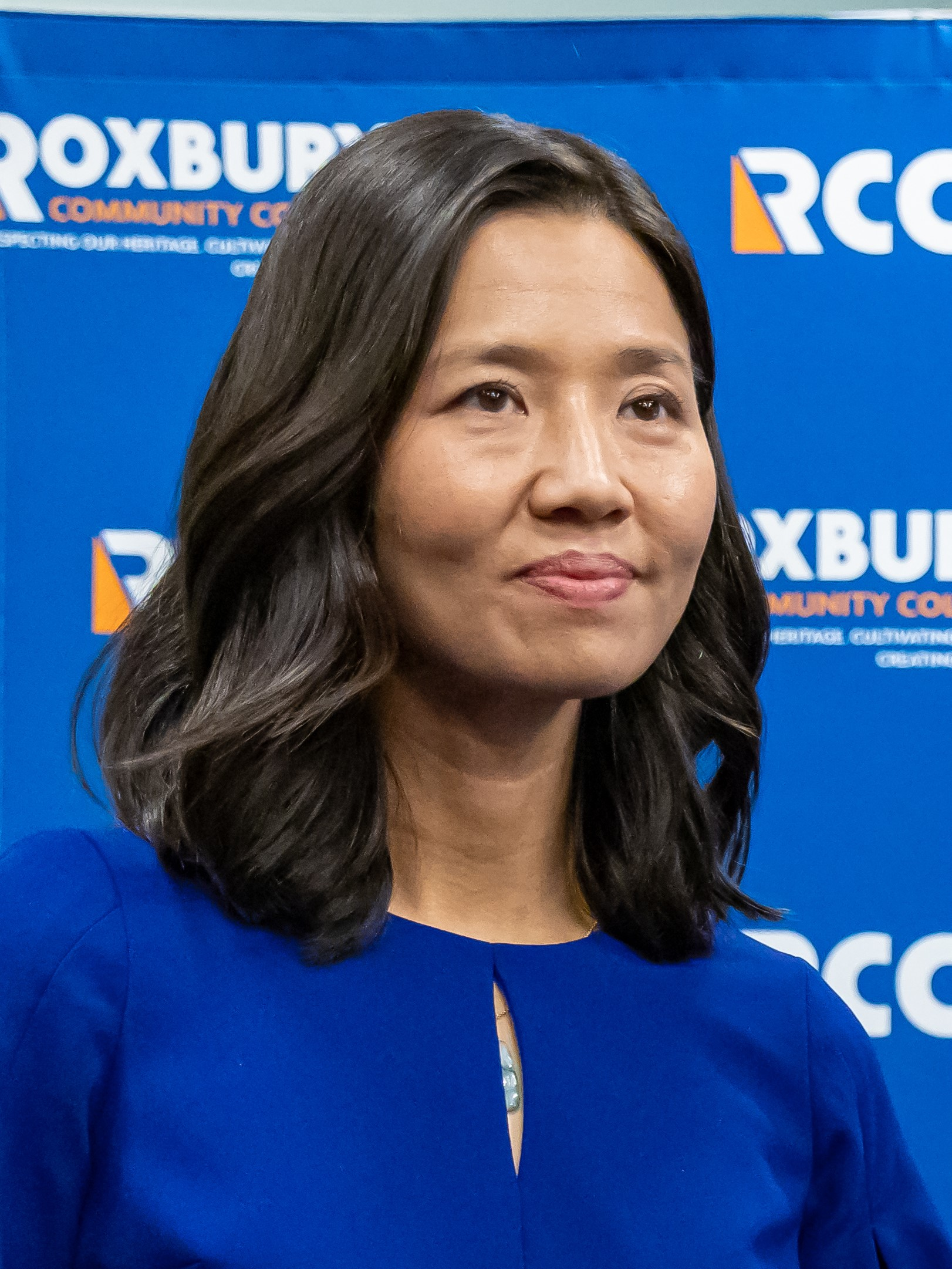
- Wu in 2024

Mayor of Boston
- Incumbent
- Assumed office November 16, 2021
- Preceded by: Kim Janey (acting)

President of the Boston City Council
- In office January 4, 2016 – January 1, 2018
- Preceded by: Bill Linehan
- Succeeded by: Andrea Campbell

Member of the Boston City Council from the at-large district
- In office January 4, 2014 – November 16, 2021
- Preceded by: Felix G. Arroyo; John R. Connolly
- Succeeded by: Erin Murphy

Personal details
- Born: January 14, 1985 (age 41) Chicago, Illinois, U.S.
- Party: Democratic
- Spouse: Conor Pewarski (m. 2012)
- Children: 3
- Education: Harvard University (BA, JD)
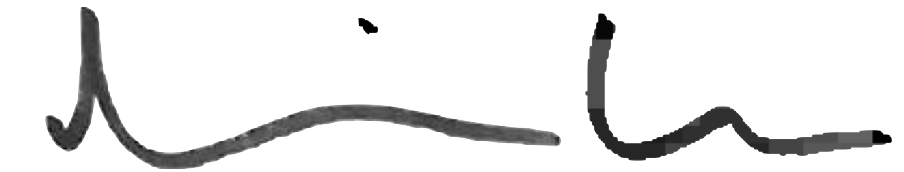
- Signature
- Website: Campaign website
- Wu's voice Wu at a Massachusetts supportive housing grant program announcement. Published August 1, 2023

Chinese name
- Chinese: 吳弭
Transcriptions
Standard Mandarin
- Hanyu Pinyin: Wú Mǐ
Yue: Cantonese
- Jyutping: Ng4 Mei5

Michelle Wu (born January 14, 1985) is an American lawyer and politician who has been the mayor of Boston since 2021. A member of the Democratic Party, she is one of the youngest mayors in the city's history, (Note: Wu was 36 years old when she was elected and sworn-in as mayor. Maurice J. Tobin was similarly elected mayor at the age of 36 in 1937; John E. Kerrigan served as acting mayor in 1945 the age of 36 years; Daniel A. Whelton served as acting mayor at the age of 32 in 1905) and is the first woman and the first Asian American to be elected to the office.

The daughter of Taiwanese American immigrants, Wu graduated with honors from Harvard University and Harvard Law School. From 2014 to 2021, she was the first Asian-American woman to serve on the Boston City Council and was its president from 2016 to 2018. While on the Boston City Council, Wu authored several ordinances that were enacted. This included an ordinance to prevent the city from contracting with health insurers that discriminate in their coverage against transgender people. She also authored ordinances to have the city protect wetlands, support adaptation to climate change, enact a plastic bag ban, adopt Community Choice Aggregation, and provide paid parental leave to municipal employees. As a city councillor, Wu also partook in a successful effort to adopt regulations on short-term rentals.

Wu was elected mayor in 2021. During her mayoralty, Wu has addressed climate change and other concerns through a municipal "Green New Deal" (the Boston Green New Deal) and signed an ordinance to divest city investments from companies that derive more than 15% of their revenue from fossil fuels, tobacco products, or prison facilities. A supporter of fare-free public transportation, Wu has funded a pilot program of fare-free service on three MBTA bus routes, expanding on a single-route pilot program that had previously been started under Kim Janey's preceding acting mayoralty. Wu succeeded in using contract negotiations with the Boston Police Patrolmen's Association as a means to create significant reforms related to police accountability. The union later endorsed Wu for re-election, the first time they had endorsed a mayor's re-election in more than three decades. She also emerged as a prominent opponent of the second Trump administration, with the Trump administration targeting the city over the Boston Trust Act. During her first term, Boston experienced a substantial reduction in gun violence and murders that resulted in multiple record-low years. She was re-elected to a second mayoral term in November 2025.

== Early life and education ==
Michelle Wu was born on January 14, 1985, on the South Side of Chicago, Illinois, to Han, a chemical engineer, and Yu-Min Wu, a homemaker. Her parents are Taiwanese American immigrants. They were Taiwanese waishengren; Han and Yu-Min were born and raised in Taipei, while Wu's grandparents had left mainland China during the Kuomintang retreat to Taiwan.

Her father, Han Wu, was admitted to the Illinois Institute of Technology for graduate studies; however, neither he nor his wife spoke much English. Raised with Mandarin Chinese as a first language, Wu often interpreted between English and Mandarin for her parents. When Wu was in high school, her parents separated and her father began living apart from the family; they later divorced.

One of four children, Wu graduated from Barrington High School in 2003 as the valedictorian of her class. Wu received perfect scores on the SAT and ACT and in 2003 was selected as a Presidential Scholar from Illinois. Wu's parents hoped that she would pursue a career in medicine; in part due to their experiences of the Chinese Civil War, they discouraged her from a career in politics. Wu has also recounted that prior to university, she had not known whether she aligned with the Democratic or Republican parties.

Wu moved to the Boston area to attend Harvard University. In 2007, she graduated cum laude with a Bachelor of Arts in economics from Harvard College. As an undergraduate, she tap danced and taught classes on citizenship in Boston's Chinatown on the weekends.

After graduation, Wu worked as a consultant with the Boston Consulting Group. When her mother began to suffer from mental illness, Wu resigned, moving back to Chicago to care for her mother and two youngest siblings. To support her family financially, Wu started a teahouse business in the North Center neighborhood of Chicago. In 2009, she returned to Massachusetts with her mother and youngest siblings to earn her J.D. from Harvard Law School, from which she graduated in 2012.

== Early career ==
In 2010, Wu worked in Boston City Hall for Mayor Thomas Menino in the Office of Administration and Finance and later as a Fellow at the Rappaport Center for Law and Public Policy under Menino's chief of staff, Mitch Weiss. In this position, she both designed a streamlined process for restaurants to receive licenses and established a food truck program. Also in 2010, Wu graduated from Emerge Massachusetts, a training program for women who aspire to elected office. The following year, she worked at the Boston Medical Center-based Medical Legal Partnership, where she provided legal services to low-income patients.

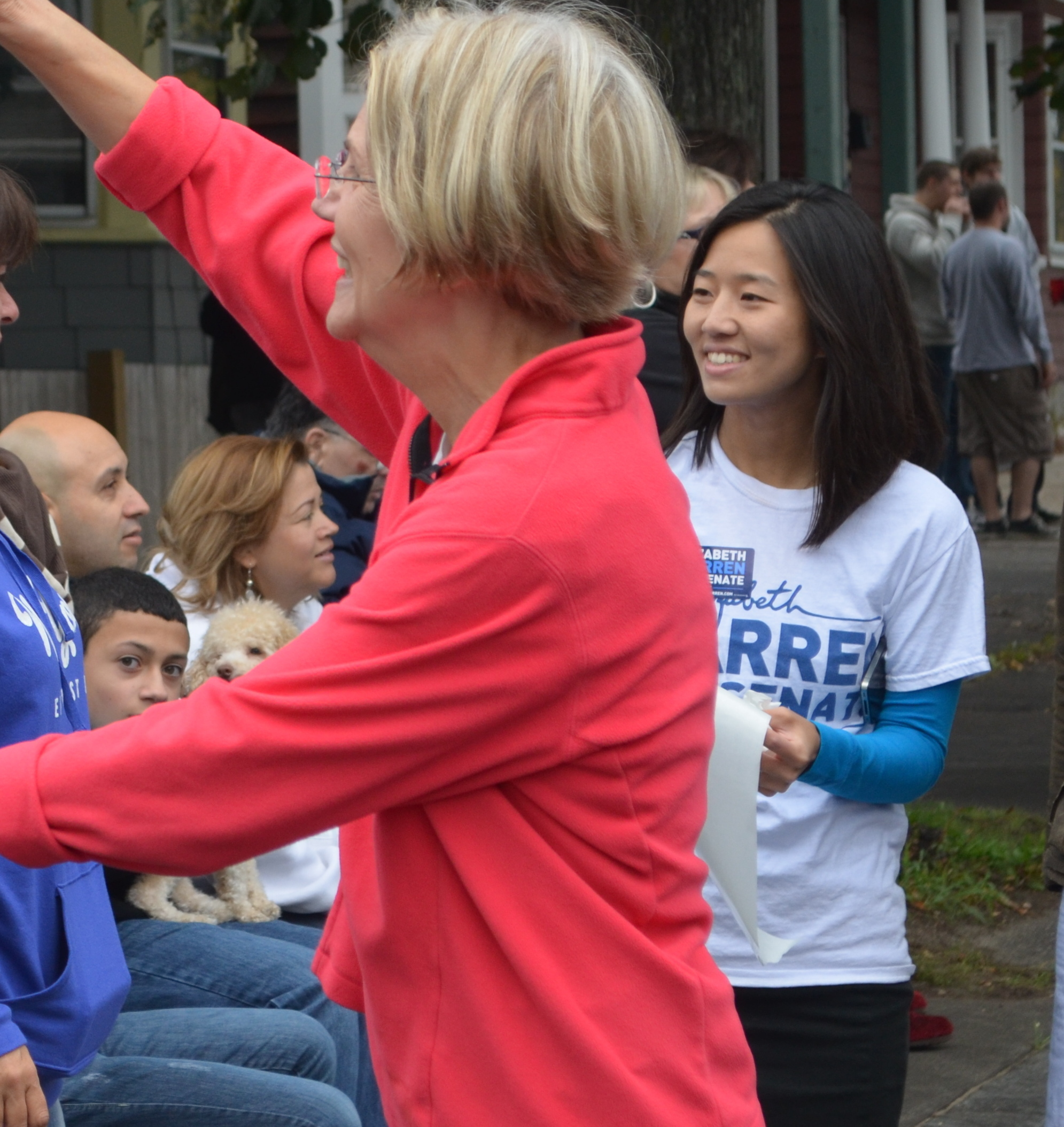
With Elizabeth Warren while working on Warren's 2012 Senate campaign

In her first semester at Harvard Law School, one of her professors was Elizabeth Warren. After Wu explained her family's situation to Warren, a long friendship developed between the two women. Warren later reflected, "Michelle was doing something in law school that, in 25 years of teaching, I never knew another student to be doing."

In 2012, Wu worked as the constituency director for Warren's successful senatorial campaign against Scott Brown. In this position, Wu coordinated outreach to all constituency groups, including nonwhites, nonheterosexuals, veterans and women. Wu is considered a protégé of Warren.

== City Council ==
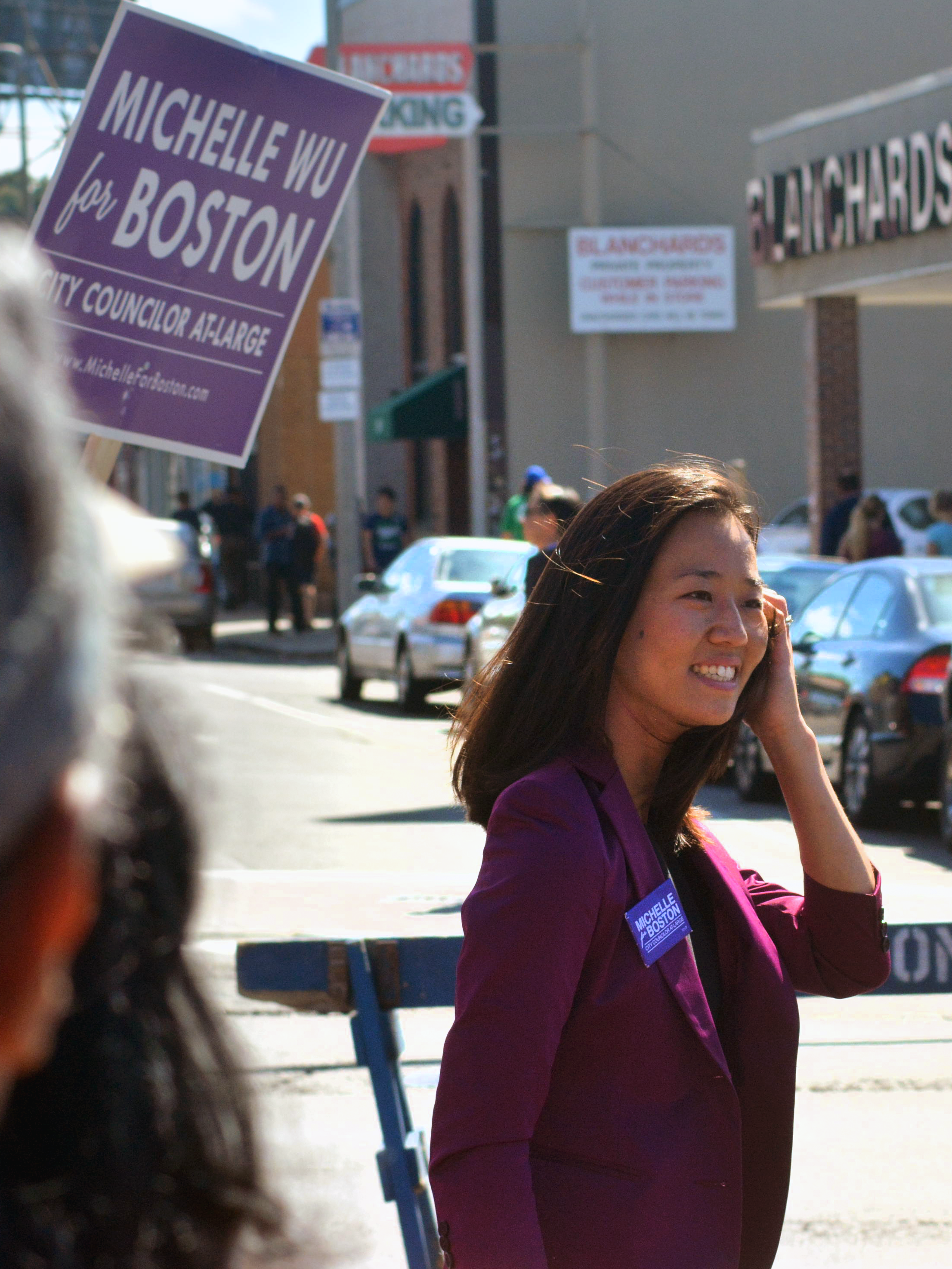
Campaigning for Boston City Council in 2013

Wu, a member of the Democratic Party, became a member of the Boston City Council in January 2014. Wu was the first Asian American woman to serve on the council, and only the second Asian American member to serve on the council. In late 2014, Wu became the first city councilor in Boston history to give birth while serving on the Boston City Council. From January 2016 to January 2018, she was president of the council, the first nonwhite woman and first Asian American to hold the role. When she took office as city council president, Wu was only the third female president in the then-106-year history of the Boston City Council. Wu was regarded as a progressive on the City Council.

Wu was first elected to a Boston City Council at-large seat in November 2013. She finished in second place to incumbent Ayanna Pressley, with the top four finishers being elected to the council. She was re-elected in 2015, 2017, and 2019, placing second behind Pressley in 2015 and placing first in both 2017 and 2019. In 2021 election, Wu decided not to seek a fifth term on the City Council and to run for mayor instead.

=== Paid parental leave ===
In April 2015, the Boston City Council passed a paid parental leave ordinance that was authored by Wu. The ordinance provided city employees with six weeks of paid parental leave after childbirth, stillbirth, or adoption. Mayor Marty Walsh supported Wu's ordinance prior to its adoption and signed it into law in May. Wu had conceived this legislation after her own first pregnancy when she learned firsthand (after giving birth in December 2014) that municipal employees were not being offered paid child leave. In 2021, Wu proposed the idea of expanding this paid child leave policy to also provide leave for the broader category of pregnancy loss, rather than strictly for stillbirths. In September, by voice vote, the Boston City Council passed an ordinance written by Councilor Lydia Edwards and co-sponsored by Wu and Annissa Essaibi George that changed the wording of her earlier ordinance from "stillbirth" to "pregnancy loss", and also extended paid family leave to those welcoming a new family member or acting as a caregiver. The ordinance was soon after signed into law by Acting Mayor Kim Janey.

=== Environmentalism and proposal for a municipal Green New Deal ===
In October 2017, the Boston City Council voted to unanimously approve a resolution by Wu and fellow councilor Matt O'Malley, having the city adopt Community Choice Aggregation. In November 2017, the Boston City Council unanimously passed an ordinance written by Wu and fellow councilor Matt O'Malley, which implemented a plastic bag ban. In December, Mayor Walsh signed it into law, despite his administration having previously opposed such a ban when it was previously debated by the Council in 2016.

In December 2019, the Boston City Council passed an ordinance that Wu had introduced with Matt O'Malley that protects local wetlands and promotes adaption to climate change. Mayor Walsh signed it into law later that month. For years, Wu spearheaded efforts to have the city divest its financial resources from fossil fuels.

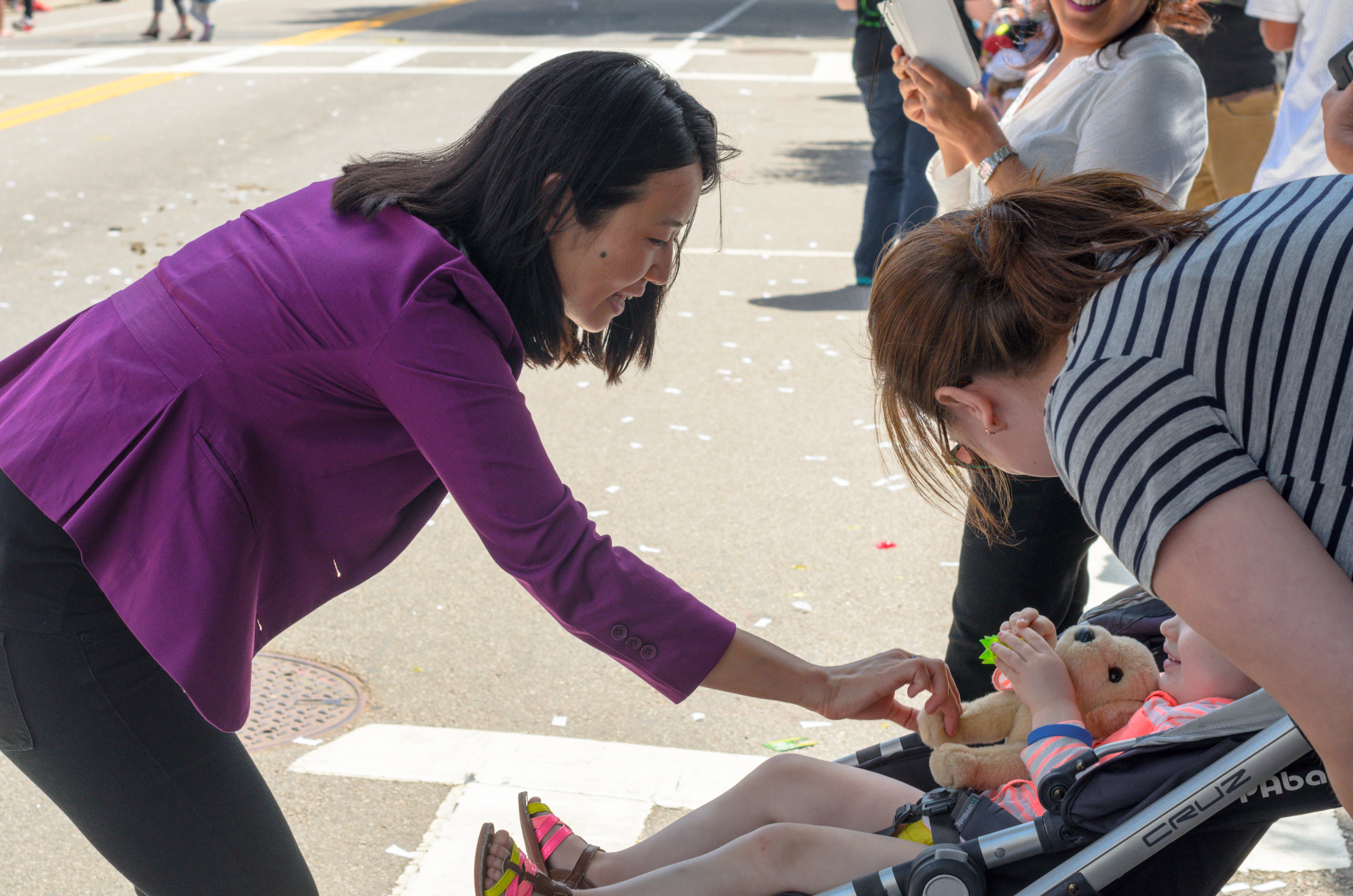
At the 2015 Dorchester Day Parade

In August 2020, Wu released plans for "Boston Green New Deal & Just Recovery" program. The proposal aims to achieve carbon neutrality (net-zero carbon footprint) for the municipal government buildings by 2024, running the city on 100% renewable energy by 2030, and achieving citywide carbon neutrality by 2040. The proposal calls for creating "just and resilient development" through the establishment of affordable green overlay districts and standard community benefits agreements; priority planning zones informed by urban heat island maps, in order to expand the urban tree canopy; and a "local blue new deal" for coasts and oceans, using coastal and ocean resources for clean energy generation, sustainable food systems, carbon capture, and jobs.

=== Housing ===
Wu was the leading force in efforts to regulate short-term rentals of housing units. Wu pushed for increased restrictions, including the elimination of investor units, and faced targeted criticism from short-term rental platform Airbnb for this. Boston adopted an ordinance, supported by Wu, that restricted short-term rentals to owner-occupied housing units, required hosts to register with the city, and required the city to collect and publish data on short-term rentals.

Wu, since at least 2019, supported the idea of reviving rent stabilization in Boston, which would first require a change to state law. She argued that it would assist in preventing nonwhite people from being pushed out of Boston. While Wu and some other Boston City Council members came out in support of the idea of rent stabilization in 2019, it was a contentious issue in the city government, with other council members and Mayor Walsh voicing opposition to it.

=== Law enforcement ===
In June 2020, Wu, alongside fellow city councilors Lydia Edwards and Julia Mejia, introduced an ordinance that would establish an unarmed community safety crisis response system, moving the response to nonviolent 9-1-1 calls away from the Boston Police Department, and instead transferring the response to non-law enforcement agencies and trained health professionals. In 2020, Wu was one of eight city councilors to sign a letter urging Mayor Walsh to decrease the Boston Police Department's annual budget by 10%. Activists had been calling for such a cut, in order to instead allot that money to COVID-19 pandemic relief, housing and food access, and other programs that would benefit nonwhite people. In June 2020, Wu was one of five members of the Boston City Council to vote against Mayor Walsh's 2021 operating budget for the city. While the budget made $12 million in cuts to the overtime budget of the police department, Wu argued that the city was still contractually obligated to pay for every hour of overtime work, meaning that it was inconsequential what the line item in the city budget proposed.

Wu voiced her desire to "demilitarize" the city's police department. She led an effort to take account of the Boston Police Department's military equipment. She also advocated for closing loopholes in the policy of the Boston Police Department regarding body cameras.

=== Advocacy for free public transport ===
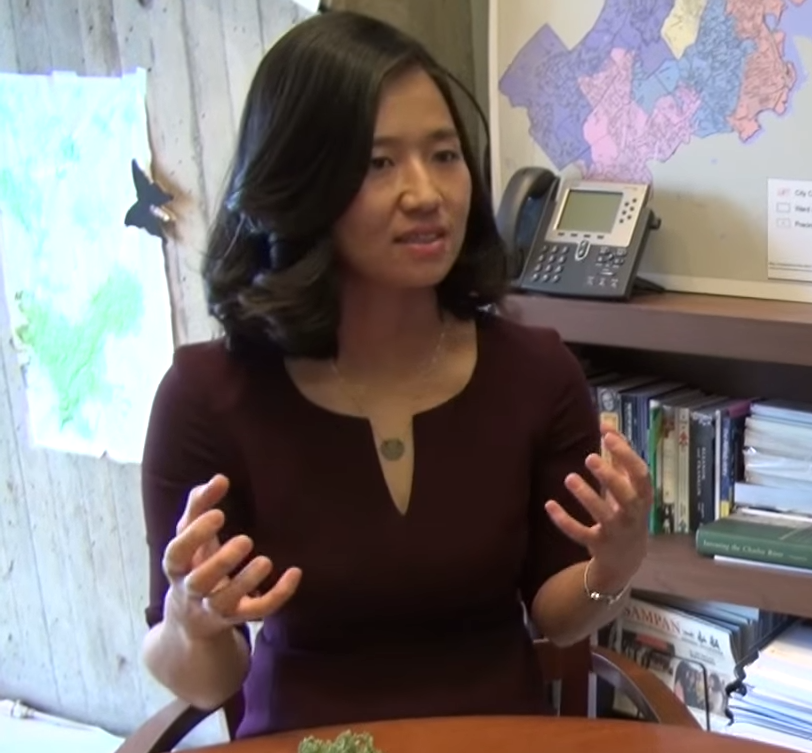
Wu in 2018

Wu proposed eliminating fares for local public transit. Wu argued that the MBTA should explore the possibility of eliminating fares in a January 31, 2019 op-ed published in The Boston Globe. Later in 2019, she and fellow councilor Kim Janey proposed making the MBTA Route 28 bus fare-free. Janey would later fund a pilot program to make the bus route fare-free for three months while acting mayor in 2021. As mayor, Wu extended the pilot on the route 28 bus, adding two additional routes to serve other lower-income areas of the city free of charge for all riders beginning March 1, 2022, and extending for two years. The charges were picked up by the city using funds from $8 million in federal pandemic relief funds. Her advocacy is seen as popularizing the idea of fare-free public transportation in Boston. Crediting Wu as a leader on fare-free public transit, in January 2021, the editorial board of The Boston Globe endorsed the idea of making the city's buses fare-free. Her promotion of fare-free public transit also inspired Lawrence, Massachusetts mayor Daniel Rivera to implement it in his city.

=== Other matters addressed as city councilor ===
Wu advocated for reforming the city's permitting system. Wu called for the abolition of the Boston Planning & Development Agency, which she characterized as being extremely politicized and "opaque". In 2019, her office published a 72-page report on the matter. Wu came into conflict with Mayor Walsh over his appointees to the city's Zoning Board of Appeals.

In March 2019, the City Council unanimously passed the Good Food Purchasing Program ordinance authored by Wu. The ordinance set new requirements for public food purchasers, such as Boston Public Schools.

In June 2014, the Boston City Council unanimously passed an ordinance Wu coauthored with fellow councilwoman Ayanna Pressley, which prohibits Boston's city government, "from contracting with any health insurer that denies coverage or discriminates in the amount of premium, policy fees, or rates charged...because of gender identity or expression". This ordinance guaranteed healthcare (including gender reassignment surgery, hormone therapy, and mental health services) to transgender city employees and dependents. Wu called the ordinance, "a matter of equity and of fairness." The ordinance had the support of Mayor Walsh prior to its passage.

Wu partnered with fellow councilor Kim Janey to probe the city's process for awarding municipal contracts. Their findings were the impetus for a subsequent move by the city to start looking at ways to diversify the recipients of city contracts.

=== Other political activity as city councilor ===
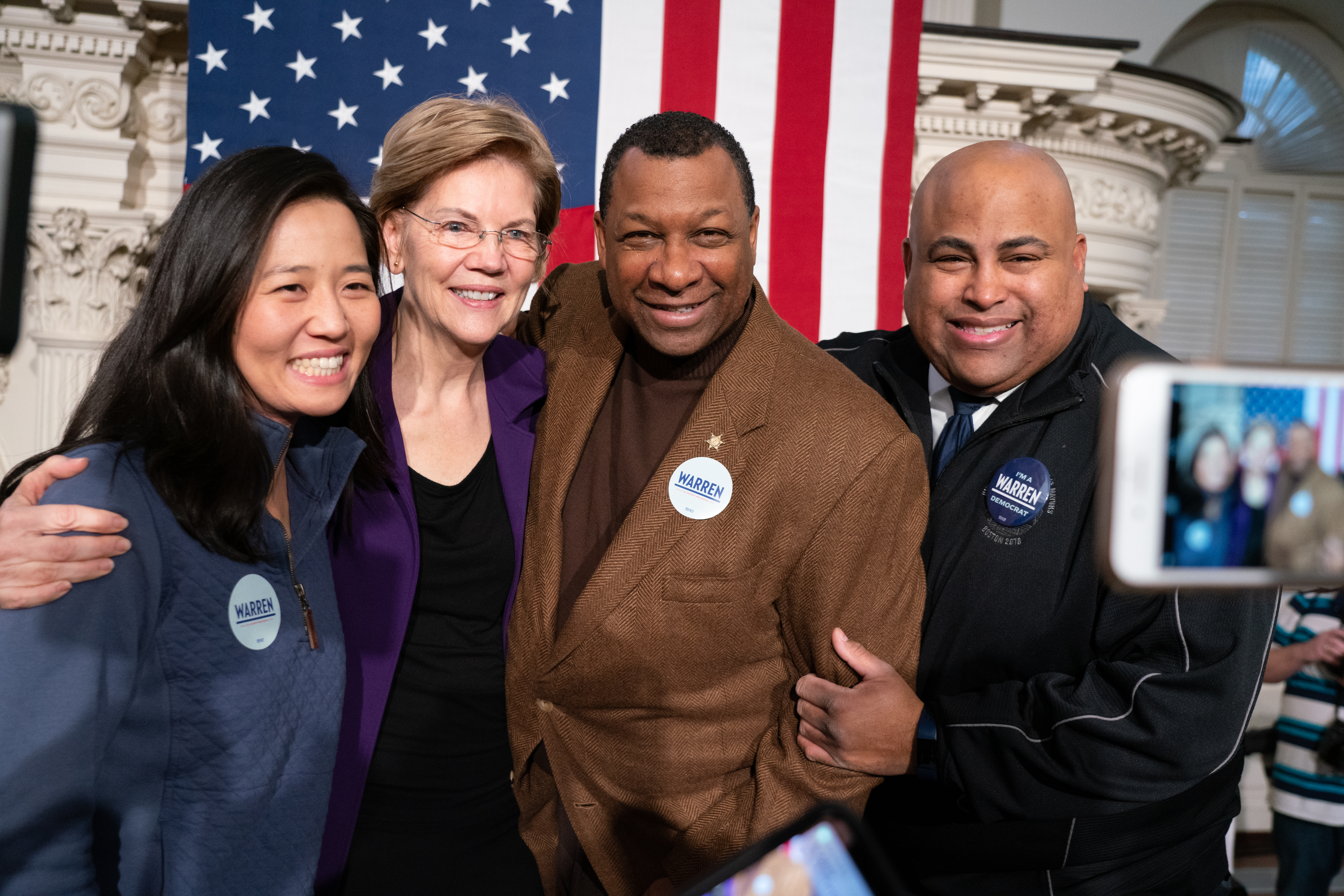
Wu with U.S. Senator Elizabeth Warren; Suffolk County Sheriff Steven W. Tompkins; and Lawrence, Massachusetts Mayor Dan Rivera at an event for Warren's 2020 presidential campaign

During the 2016 Democratic Party presidential primary, Wu endorsed the candidacy of Hillary Clinton. Wu was among the earliest supporters of Ayanna Pressley's successful 2018 Democratic primary election challenge to incumbent U.S. congressman Mike Capuano. In the 2018 election cycle, Wu also endorsed Jay Gonzalez's unsuccessful campaign in the Massachusetts gubernatorial election. Wu endorsed Elizabeth Warren's 2020 presidential campaign in a speech at Warren's official campaign launch in February 2019. Wu was a campaign surrogate for Warren, campaigning on her behalf in New Hampshire and Iowa ahead of those states' primary and caucuses, respectively.

=== Recognition received as city councilor ===
At the end of 2013, the readers of Boston magazine voted Wu to be named the magazine's 2013 "Rookie of the Year", one of three political awards given by the magazine that year. In 2016, Frank Bruni of The New York Times named Wu as one of the United States', "14 Young Democrats to Watch". In 2017, the Massachusetts Democratic Party awarded Wu its Franklin and Eleanor Roosevelt Award, which it considers its highest honor. In March 2018, Wu was among six finalists to be honored as a "Rising Star" by EMILY's List, a national group that supports female Democratic candidates who support abortion rights. The next month, Wu was listed as one of the "100 Most Influential People in Boston" by Boston magazine, being listed 31st on the list. In 2019, Rachel Allen of The Atlantic wrote that Wu had emerged as one of Boston's "most effective politicians".

== Mayoralty ==
=== Mayoral election campaigns ===
==== 2021 mayoral campaign ====
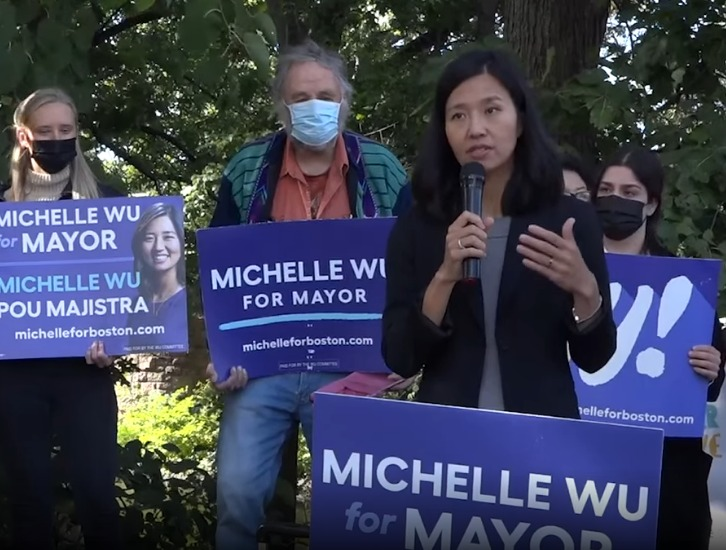
Wu campaigning for mayor in September 2021

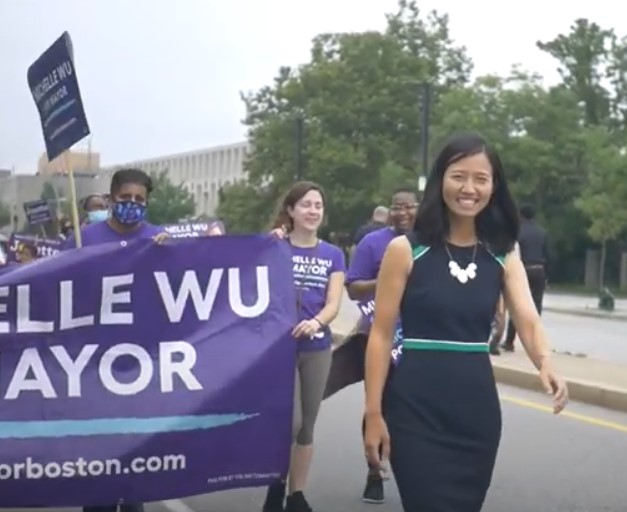
Wu participating in the 2021 Roxbury Unity Parade

Wu had long been viewed as a future mayoral prospect, fielding questions about whether she'd consider one day running as far back as 2016. Since at least 2019, Wu was viewed as a potential challenger to incumbent mayor Marty Walsh, if Walsh sought reelection in 2021. She announced her candidacy on September 15, 2020. She was regarded to be challenging Walsh from the political left.

Walsh was designated by President-elect Joe Biden to be his nominee for Secretary of Labor on January 7, 2021, leaving the mayor's race an open seat. Senator Elizabeth Warren endorsed Wu for mayor two days later. By September 2021, Wu was widely considered to be the front-runner in the nonpartisan primary election, with a significant polling lead. Wu ultimately placed first in the nonpartisan primary and advanced to the general election, where she faced fellow city council member Annissa Essaibi George. Other candidates in the primary election had been acting mayor Kim Janey, city councilor Andrea Campbell, and former city economic chief John Barros.

On September 25, Acting Mayor Kim Janey, who placed fourth in the nonpartisan primary, endorsed Wu for the general election. Wu was viewed as the front-runner in the general election campaign, with advantages in endorsements, including from cultural groups, Congresswoman Ayanna Pressley, both of Massachusetts' U.S. Senators (Ed Markey and Elizabeth Warren), and the editorial board of The Boston Globe. Ellen Barry of The New York Times characterized Wu as having benefited as a candidate from her years of engagement with the city's residents as a city councilor. She opined that Wu's work while on the City Council had introduced her to many of the city's voters and that Wu was, "difficult to caricature as a radical." In both the primary and general elections, Wu ran on a progressive-oriented agenda.

On November 2, 2021, Wu won the election with over 64% of the vote, representing the first time Boston elected a mayor that wasn't a white male. As the youngest mayor in the modern era, Wu became the first woman, first nonwhite and first Asian American person to be elected mayor of Boston. Wu won sizable margins among various demographic groups, leading her victory to be characterized as one with a multiethnic coalition. Wu was sworn in on November 16, 2021.

==== 2025 mayoral campaign ====
In the 2025 Boston mayoral election, challenger Josh Kraft's campaign against Wu vastly outspent her campaign. Kraft spent record amounts for a Boston preliminary election. However, in the September 9 preliminary election Wu received more than 71% of the vote, having a 49–point lead over Kraft that was described by The Boston Globe as "staggering" and the Dorchester Reporter as a "blowout". Two days after the preliminary, Kraft ended his candidacy. With Kraft filing to have his name removed from the ballot, and with no other candidate receiving the sufficient number of votes to qualify to replace him, Wu ran unopposed in the general election.

=== Transition into office ===
Wu had a shorter transition into office than most mayors of Boston due to the fact that there was no permanent incumbent mayor at the time of the election. Under Boston's city charter, in such circumstances, new mayors are sworn in as soon as is conveniently possible after the results of the election are certified. Before the election, on September 24, candidates Wu and Essaibi George had met with Acting Mayor Janey at the George Francis Parkman House and mutually agreed on November 16 date as a tentative date for a transition of power for the mayoralty. Wu would ultimately take office as mayor on that planned date. This meant that she had only a two-week period between her election and assumption of office.

=== Relationship with the Boston City Council ===
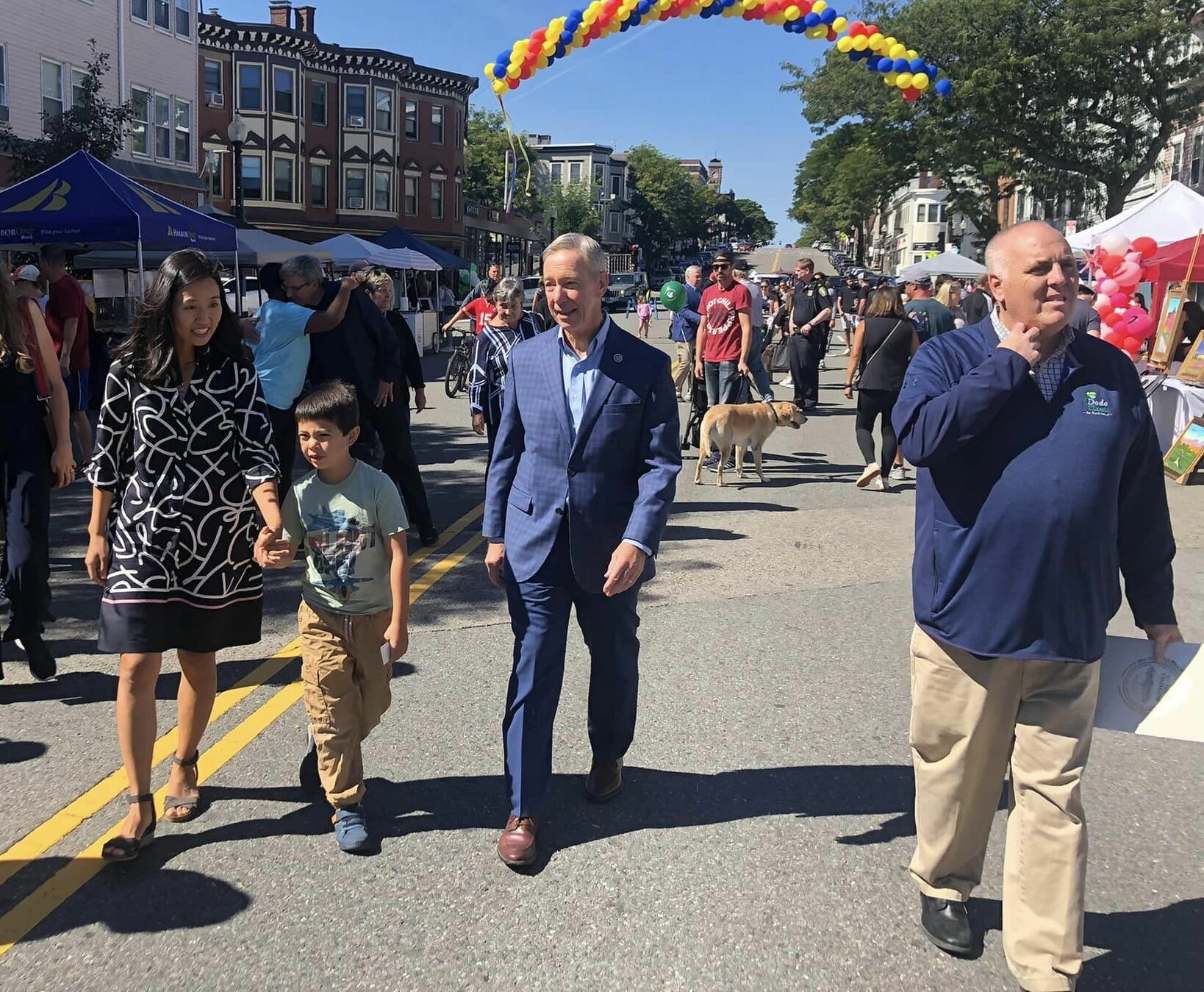
Wu (left) in 2022 at Boston's 22nd Annual Street Festival with Congressman Stephen Lynch (center) and City Council President Ed Flynn (right)

In March 2023, Emma Platoff of the Boston Globe credited Wu's ability to frequently prevail on matters that she and the City Council had not been aligned on to Wu's own "political savvy", the strong legal power afforded to mayors of Boston, divisions on the City Council that gave the body a weaker negotiating position, and the inexperience of new council members.

=== Environment and climate change ===
Wu serves on the steering committee on Climate Mayors. She has supported the resolution authored by Senator Ed Markey and Congresswoman Alexandria Ocasio-Cortez to recognize a duty of the federal government to create a Green New Deal.

Within the city, Wu signed an ordinance on November 22, 2021, to divest city investments from companies that derive more than 15% of their revenue from fossil fuels, tobacco products, or prison facilities. This is seen as being part of her pursuit of a municipal Green New Deal for Boston. The process entails the divestment of $65 million in city assets. The new rules do not apply to Boston's employee pension fund, which is governed by state law. While a member of the city council, she had fought for the adoption of such a policy. On May 16, 2022, Wu pledged that the city would carry out a "Green New Deal" for Boston Public Schools (BPS) school buildings, which will see renovation of existing facilities and the construction new ones. This plan expands the funding the city is to invest in school construction from the $1 billion outlined in Marty Walsh's 2015 BuildBPS plan to $2 billion. She then unveiled a proposed home rule petition in August 2022 that would see the city request entrance to the state's pilot program for municipalities to ban fossil fuels from most new buildings, with the exception of labs and hospitals. The following month, the Boston City Council approved the home rule petition 9–3. The next step is for the state legislature to rule on whether to grant the petition. As part of a $20 million housing program funded through COVID recovery funds, Wu's mayoral administration is planning to launch the "Large Building Green Energy Retrofits Program" providing building owners of buildings with fifteen or more units up to $10,000 to support efforts to reduce their buildings' energy use through "deep energy retrofits". The program is targeted at retrofitting the city's existing housing stock. In July 2023, Wu signed an executive order halting the use of fossil fuels in new municipal buildings and major renovations. In 2024, Wu's climate push had mixed results, including winning a $10 million federal grant for climate-related job training and a failed vote with the Boston Zoning Commission to accelerate the net-zero requirement for all new buildings.

Wu has called attention to the health risks that many residents, and disproportionately nonwhite people, face due to air pollution from highways, especially in Chinatown. In April 2022, on Earth Day, as part of the city's Climate Ready Boston efforts, Wu unveiled the Heat Resilience for Boston plan. This plan centers on combatting the impacts of rising heat extremes, focusing on the "environmental justice communities" of Chinatown, Dorchester, East Boston, Mattapan, and Roxbury. Wu also announced the creation of the Boston Extreme Temperatures Response Task Force to coordinate efforts across the city related to handling heat extremes.

=== COVID-19 pandemic ===
In December 2021, Wu announced a city COVID-19 vaccine mandate and passport. Under the mandate, people ages 12 and older, in order to enter indoor public venues (bars, restaurants, gyms, theaters, and sports venues) in Boston, would be required to show proof of at least their first COVID-19 vaccine dose by January 15, 2022, and proof of full vaccination by February 15, 2022. The mandate created opposition, as she also removed the option for city workers to test as an alternative to vaccination. Wu stated in an interview with Boston Public Radio that she received racist messages in response to vaccine requirements. Some opponents circulated false rumors about Wu being hospitalized for panic attacks while in office. Her main legal opposition came from the firefighter and police unions who successfully sued to block the mandate for city employees on February 15, 2022. On February 19, 2022, Wu announced that the city would end its proof-of-vaccine mandate for public places with immediate effect.

The Wu administration also required city employees to be vaccinated against COVID-19 (with exceptions for employees with medical reasons and religious objectors), and about 94% of city employees were in compliance with that requirement by late January 2022. Wu extended the deadline for city employees to comply. Some public employee unions fought the mandate in court, arguing that the mandate rules should be subject to collective bargaining. A Massachusetts Appeals Court judge sided with the unions, blocking the city worker mandate. Wu faced persistent demonstrations outside of her house protesting her COVID measures.

=== Housing and development ===
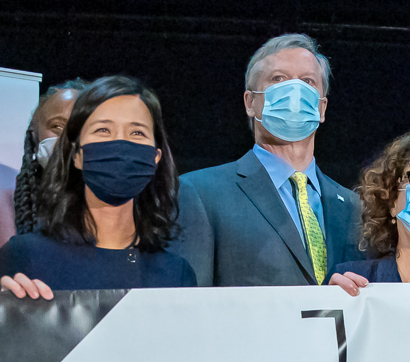
Wu with Governor Charlie Baker at the December 2021 groundbreaking of an affordable housing development

Wu has given far fewer appointments for one-on-one meetings with private developers than her predecessors did, giving them fewer opportunities to directly lobby her on policies. In December 2021, Wu signed into law an ordinance amending the city's zoning code by eliminating off-street parking minimums for new affordable developments where 60% of the units are income-restricted at 100% the area median income in order to remove a barrier for the construction of new units of affordable housing. In October 2022, Wu signed an executive order that changed the approval process in the city for new income-restricted affordable housing developments. The order sought to halve the time that the approval process takes. Impacting nine city agencies (including the BPDA), the order established a separate review and approval process for affordable housing developments and requested the BPDA give priority to such developments.

In her early months as mayor, Wu moved hundreds of unhoused individuals who had been living in the Mass and Cass area to temporary housing. In January 2022, Wu designated $50 million to fund improvements to the Mildred C. Hailey Apartments complex in the Jamaica Plain neighborhood. In January 2022, Wu also signed an executive order to adopt a municipal Affirmatively Furthering Fair Housing policy. This made Boston the largest city in the United States to adopt such a policy. Wu's 2020 Municipal Green New Deal proposal calls for "decommodifying housing" through the expansion of cooperative housing, community land trusts, and community ownerships. It also calls for the establishment of a renters' right to counsel, guaranteeing legal representation to tenants in eviction proceedings.

Since as early as 2019, Wu has supported reviving rent stabilization in Boston, which would first require a change to state law. In March 2022, Wu announced the creation of a Rent Stabilization Advisory Committee, which will report to the city's Office of Housing on Strategies with advice on means to stabilize rents in the city and to combat the displacement of tenants, with the aim of creating a proposal to present to the City Council. On March 8, 2023, in a 11–2 vote the Boston City Council consented to two home rule petitions proposed by Wu: one asking the state government to permit the city to implement a form of rent control, and the other asking the state to permit Boston to implement Wu's plan to restructure the Boston Planning & Development Agency. The two petitions will need to be approved by the state government in order for Boston to be granted these permissions. In February 2026, Wu endorsed a state ballot measure that would implement rent control in Massachusetts.

=== Transportation ===
Boston's public transportation operator, the MBTA, is a division of the Massachusetts Department of Transportation (MassDOT), limiting the power that the mayor of Boston has over transportation in the city. Nevertheless, Wu has taken actions and voiced positions related to the city's transportation.

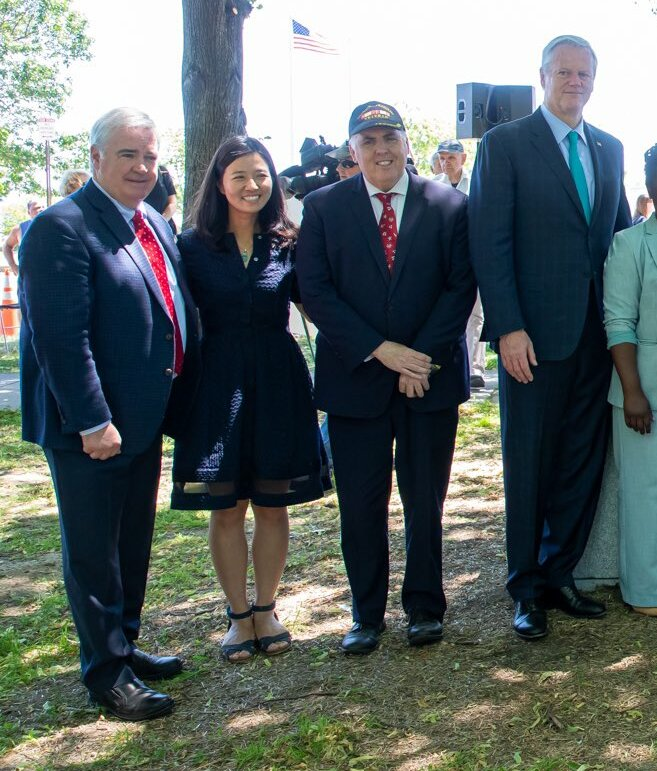
L–R: City Councilman Michael F. Flaherty, Wu, City Council President Ed Flynn, and Governor Charlie Baker in June 2022

In December 2021, Wu extended by two months the fare-free pilot program for the MBTA Route 28 bus that was started under the acting mayoralty of Kim Janey. She did this while engaging in talks with the MBTA to further extend the pilot program. The city had, in November 2021, announced that its data showed that during the pilot program ridership had increased to an excess of 70,000 in weekly ridership. Pre COVID-pandemic weekly ridership on the route had been 47,000, making the COVID-era pilot program ridership significantly greater despite the general impact of the COVID-19 pandemic on public transportation ridership. The city concluded that, in comparison to ridership trends on comparable routes of the MBTA, the increase in ridership was directly attributable to the pilot program. A later more in-depth 2022 analysis found an overall 38% increase in weekday ridership from 7,500 before the pandemic (with fares) to 10,200 during the September and October periods during the pilot program.

In mid-November 2021, Wu sent an appropriations order to the Boston City Council to ask for approval to appropriate $8 million of federal funds to fund two years of fare-free service on the MBTA Route 23, 28, and 29 buses. These buses serve the Dorchester, Mattapan, and Roxbury communities. At the start of December, the City Council approved the appropriations order 12–1. On February 9, 2022, Wu and MBTA General Manager Steve Poftak announced that the two-year program for the three routes to be fare-free was officially agreed to and would be launched on March 1, 2022.

=== Policing ===
In July 2022, following a seven-month search, Wu named Michael Cox as the new commissioner of the Boston Police Department.

In June 2023, Wu vetoed a $5 million cut in Boston Police and Veterans Services departments proposed by the City Council calling their attempt "illusory, as the city is obligated to cover salary and overtime expenses incurred by the department," and that the city's budget should be "built on a foundation of effective delivery of city services that are central to our residents' quality of life."

In December 2023, Wu reached a contract agreement with the Boston Police Patrolmen's Association. In the terms of the contract, the union agreed that officers would lose the option to use arbitration to appeal firings or other disciplinary measures if they are convicted of certain crimes. The contract also saw the union agree to allow pay details of the department to be made public, and for there to be more strict outlines on when officers are permitted to take medical leave. Yawu Miller of the Bay State Banner described it as being, "the first [contract] in which [Boston] city officials have managed to secure significant reforms from the Patrolmen’s union." It was approved unanimously by the Boston City Council on December 13, 2024. In March 2024, a similar contract was reached with the Boston Police Detectives Benevolent Society.

In her first term as mayor, Wu saw great success at meeting her goal of lowering the city's rates of violence. Over the course of 2023, Boston experienced the fewest homicides it had seen in any year on record. 2023 also saw a new record low for gun violence rates in the city. In 2024, the city a significant further reduction in its homicide rate. In 2024, Boston recorded what local law enforcement hailed as one of the city's safest years on record, reaching a new recorded low number of homicides. Murder rates in Boston have been characterized as "plummeting". The number of shooting fatalities was noted to have greatly decreased over the previous three years. By the end of 2024, the city had exceeded its objective of reaching a 20% reduction in annual homicides ahead of schedule. By 2024 and 2025, data indicated that Boston was safer than many similarly sized cities in the United States. An article published by the Vera Institute of Justice in September 2024 found Boston is one of the safest major cities in the United States. In the first half of 2025, Boston homicide rates increased from the year prior. However, its rates were still similar to rates in the first half of 2023, a year which had previously been a record-low year for murders in the city. Crime researcher Thomas Abt observed, "Boston's success in driving gun violence downward now means that small increases in homicides look large in percentage terms. Overall, the city's anti-violence efforts are a success."

Wu holding her infant daughter in a hearing room on the day of her March 5, 2025, congressional testimony. Wu, a Catholic, had ash on her forehead due to her observance of the coinciding holiday of Ash Wednesday.

As Donald Trump took office in early 2025 for his second presidency, Wu and the new presidential administration emerged as being publicly at odds over the administrations dislike of the existing Boston Trust Act (a so-called "sanctuary city" law), and Wu's steadfast defense of the local law. In March 2025, Wu complied with a congressional subpoena and testified before the House Committee on Oversight and Government Reform in hearings about major "sanctuary city" policies and cooperation with federal immigration authorities. The hearings featured several other mayors of large American cities. John L. Milcek of MassLive described Wu's performance in the more than five hours of hearings as a "star turn" for her, writing, "the Democratic mayor deftly parried jibes from Republicans who sounded like they’d never set foot in Boston". Sri Taylor of Bloomberg News described the hearing as having carried "high stakes" for Wu, and credited her performance in the hearing with having garnering her a "newfound role as both a favorite foil for Republican critics in Washington and a capable messenger for Democrats," noting that while Republicans on the committee had hoped to hurt Wu's reputation in the hearings, "It was Wu who walked away with a series of sound bites defending Boston and Democrat priorities that made the rounds on social media and bolstered her national presence." In September 2025, U.S. Attorney General Pam Bondi filed a lawsuit against Boston and its police department, asserting that the Boston Trust Act (a so-called "sanctuary city" ordinance adopted in 2014) is a violation of federal law. Wu is named a co-defendant in her official capacity as mayor.

In Wu's bid for re-election in 2025, her candidacy received an early endorsement from the Boston Police Patrolmen's Association and affiliated emergency medical services (EMS) unions. In their endorsement, the union's leadership praised her performance in office, and noted that this marked the unions' first endorsement of an incumbent mayor's re-election in thirty years.

=== Racial equity ===
Wu has expressed a belief that her cabinet should reflect the city's population, arguing that that is consequential towards making the city's government more responsive to its different communities. Nonwhites hold a majority in her cabinet. As of August 2022, Wu's cabinet had thirteen black members, thirteen white members, six Latino members, and two Asian members. In December 2023, Wu organized an "Electeds of Color" holiday party, an affinity group event which excluded white members of the City Council. While Council member Frank Baker called the event "divisive" and "inflammatory," Wu refused to apologize.

In January 2022, Wu signed an executive order to adopt a municipal Affirmatively Furthering Fair Housing policy. This made Boston the largest city in the United States to adopt such a policy.

In May 2022, Boston awarded a $17 million contract to City Fresh Foods, a local black-owned business, to be a vendor for Boston City Schools. This was the largest non-construction contract that the city had awarded to a certified black-owned business in its history. This has been credited as being indicative of Wu's impact on how the city government views matters of diversity. The contract has also been credited as helping to achieve the goals of the Good Food Purchasing Program that was created by an ordinance that had been authored by Wu as a city councilwoman.

=== Education and childcare ===
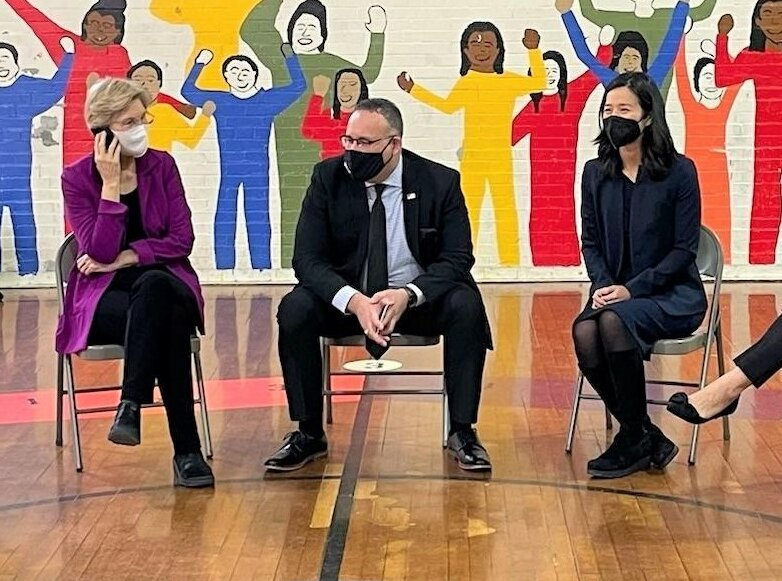
Wu (right) in March 2022 with U.S. Secretary of Education Miguel Cardona (center) and Senator Elizabeth Warren (left)

In May 2022, Wu unveiled plans for a "Green New Deal" for Boston Public School buildings, which doubles the capital spending that the city will devote to the construction of new and renovated school buildings to $2 billion compared to the $1 million that had been outlined in former mayor Marty Walsh's 2015 BuildBPS plan. Wu has pledged for the city to have a more equitable and transparent process for school construction and capital improvements than in the past and that the process will involve input from students, educators, and parents. In September 2022, Wu announced the creation of the Cabinet for Worker Empowerment. One of the tasks of this new department is providing oversight to this "Green New Deal" for the city's schools. Another of the department's tasks is to establish a trust fund for childcare.

In July 2022, Wu signed an executive order outlining the formula for what funds developers building in the city's downtown must contribute to fund child care services. This executive order builds upon a policy implemented in 1989 under the mayoralty of Raymond Flynn, which requires that new commercial developments in the city's downtown provide childcare services on-site or otherwise fund resources for off-site childcare spaces. However, the policy had, previous to Wu's executive order, been difficult to enforce due to the fact that the policy did not previous provide a clear definition of the amounts that developers needed to pay.

Wu opposed proposals by the state to place Boston Public Schools into state receivership, which arose from negative assessments of the city's schools in studies that were taken in 2020, before her mayoralty. In June 2022, Wu and Massachusetts state education officials settled on an agreement to improve Boston Public Schools, averting receivership. In February 2023, Wu vetoed a city council ordinance to advance a home rule petition that requested that the state make the city's public school board an elected body. Wu wrote that she, "deeply respect[s]" the advocates' of the ordinance, but, "cannot support legislative changes that would compromise our ability to stabilize and support the Boston Public Schools during this critical period." Previously, when she had run for mayor in 2021 Wu's education plan had called for a restructuring of the Boston School Committee that would have seen the committee have a majority of its seats be elected. Wu backed away from this support of a transition to a partially elected board after becoming mayor, arguing that it was an inopportune time for such a change to take place.

=== Business, labor, and economic development ===
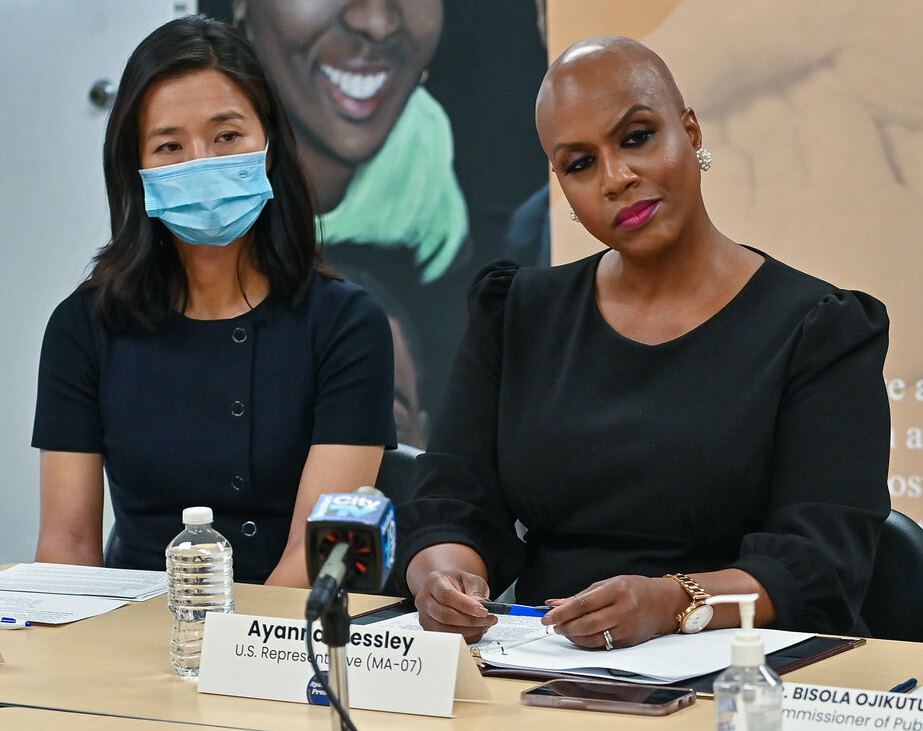
Wu with Congresswoman Ayanna Pressley in November 2022

It has been observed that Wu's approach to dealing with the city's business elite has differed from her predecessors. In May 2023, Brian McGrory of The Boston Globe observed that Wu has given greater precedence toward attending to other municipal concerns than she does to giving an audience to the city's business elites. Describing Wu as "a different kind of mayor, with a different view of her city" from her predecessors, McGrory wrote, "when Wu sets her priorities...[and] when she imagines her legacy, she’s not gazing at the city’s skyline or at the people who are building it. Rather, she's obsessed with the seemingly intractable problems that fester in the shadows of those gleaming towers." Also in May 2023, Shirley Leung (also of The Boston Globe) similarly observed that, "previous mayors have welcomed tête-à-têtes with real estate developers and other captains of industry to discuss projects or other matters. Often, those were one-on-one meetings. [...] Instead, she prefers to assemble groups of leaders to help shape specific policies and forge public-private partnerships...the noticeable change in approach continues to ruffle the feathers of those who are used to having the ear of the mayor, all of which is perpetuating a narrative that Wu is indifferent to business interests." It has been also been observed by The Boston Globe that Wu grants substantially fewer meetings to real estate developers than her processors had, giving them less opportunities to directly lobby her.

As a city councilor, Wu had called for reforming the procurement process for city contracts in order to ensure that businesses owned by nonwhites, women, and city residents are given a "fair shot" at winning contracts. She also called for the city to provide assistance for nonwhite entrepreneurs as well as support for small neighborhood businesses. She also called for greater government transparency regarding corporate tax breaks, and introduced an ordinance in 2019 that was aimed at accomplishing that. In December 2017, after the Boston City Council passed the "Ordinance on Equity in Opportunity for City Contracting", Wu and fellow city councilor Ayanna Pressley authored an op-ed published in the Dorchester Reporter which hailed the ordinance and argued that the city needed to "continue to create pipelines for local residents and businesses owned by women and people of color."

In August 2022, Boston received a $23 million American Rescue Plan challenge grant from the Economic Development Administration to establish a Regional Workforce Training System aimed at training and placing individuals for 4,618 quality jobs in targeted industries over three years starting in October 2022. The Mayor's Office of Workforce Development had been the lead applicant, working with other there parties and organizations in their grant application. On Labor Day 2022, Wu announced the creation of the Cabinet for Worker Empowerment. One of the tasks this new department was assigned is overseeing the creation of more job training centers in the city.

=== Recognition received as mayor ===
In 2022, Wu was honored by Gold House (which honors those of Asian Pacific descent). The organization honored her and fellow mayors Bruce Harrell and Aftab Pureval as having made the "most impact" in the field of advocacy and policy. The Harvard College Class of 2022 selected Wu to be their Class Day speaker. Wu had been the first alumnus of Harvard College to be elected mayor of Boston since Malcolm Nichols was elected in 1925. In 2022, Time magazine recognized Wu in its Time100 Next list of emerging leaders. The article accompanying her entry was authored by Congresswoman Ayanna Pressley. In 2022, Wu received the "Catalyst for Justice Award" from Massachusetts Public Health Association. The Boston Bar Association gave Wu the "Voice of Change" award at its 2023 Beacon Awards for Diversity, Equity & Inclusion.

In 2022, Boston magazine ranked Wu at the top of its list of "100 Most Influential Bostonians". In 2023, she was ranked ninth on the annual list, which had been expanded to now list 150 individuals. In 2024, the magazine ranked Wu as second on the list behind only Governor Maura Healey, describing the two as being the city's "power duo". In 2025, she was ranked seventh on the list, with Governor Healey again ranked one spot above her, and Wu's newborn daughter also being given an honorable-mention with a 151st spot on the list of 150.

Wu has also received recognition honoring her for supporting the arts. In 2023 Mayor Wu received the annual "Champion Award" for her dedication to the arts and education in Massachusetts. That same year, Wu and former acting mayor Janey received the Boston Arts Academy Foundation's "Champion Award".

== Political stances and ideology ==
Wu's political outlook extends the concept of "laboratories of democracy" (which is conventionally used to describe U.S. state governments) to local government: aiming for Boston to provide proof of concept for various progressive reforms.

Both during her tenure as mayor and as a member of the Boston City Council, Wu has been described as being a progressive. Wu has also been described as a liberal. Early into her council career, Wu identified herself as a "pragmatic progressive". In September 2022, Ginia Bellafante of The New York Times described Wu as a "progressive but not aggressively ideological" mayor. In November 2021, Ellen Barry of The New York Times opined that while Wu is a strong progressive, she is also "difficult to caricature as a radical." In 2024, E. Tammy Kim of The New Yorker described the political philosophy that Wu promotes as, "progressive pragmatism" Benjamin Wallace-Wells (also of The New Yorker) opined in 2025 that, in her first term, Wu had both demonstrated a more pragmatic approach to local governance than other left-leaning American officials, and had had a more successful tenure than other left-leaning local officials.

A number of analysts and some local voices in Boston's left-wing politics have suggested that over the course of her first term, Wu moderated away from some of left-wing positions of she had held previously. Other local progressives have countered this, asserting that Wu has remained committed to progressive causes. Wu, herself, has argued that as mayor she has remained guided by the same "values, principles, goals" that had guided her previously. In a May 2025 profile, Emma Platoff and Niki Griswold of The Boston Globe opined that Wu had indeed shifted the tone with which she spoke on issues such as environmentalism (noting that Wu had by 2025 largely ceased referring to her environmental policies as a "Green New Deal") and policing, and had moderated on several specific stances related to policing. However, Platoff and Griswold also characterized Wu as having "made strides on many progressive causes" in her first term as mayor, including on police reform and environmentalism. She has continued to be characterized as a progressive by analysts.

Wu has expressed a view that elections can be won by speaking to the public's desire for "government to work and to get things done that matter and that will make a difference in their lives," believing that laying out a vision and policies for such change is more effective than mere slogans at attracting voter support. She has been widely described as a protégée of Elizabeth Warren. WGBH columnist Adam Reilly has described Wu as also having been a mentee of the late Boston Mayor Thomas Menino (whose administration Wu had worked in).

=== Abortion ===
As a city councilor and as mayor, Wu has positioned herself in support of protecting access to abortion care. In 2019, several years prior to the Dobbs v. Jackson Women's Health Organization decision, Wu urged Massachusetts state lawmakers to adopt the Roe Act, a proposed state statute intended to codify the protections for abortion care provided by the Roe v. Wade U.S. Supreme Court decision.

=== Employment practices ===
In February 2014, the Boston City Council unanimously passed a resolution authored by Wu which voiced the City Council's support for the Massachusetts Domestic Workers' Bill of Rights that was pending before the Massachusetts State Legislature.

As City Councilor, Wu voiced support for a "fair work week", $15 minimum wage, paid family and medical leave, protections for freelancers.

In October 2018, Wu proposed a "fair work week" ordinance, which would have required all city contractors to give employees at least two weeks of notice prior to changing their schedules, and would require employers to compensate workers for late schedule changes.

Wu's 2020 proposal for a "food justice" agenda for Boston called for an increase to the minimum wage paid to food-sector workers and for providing guaranteed paid sick leave to them. It also took a stance in favor of gradually phasing out tipped wage for restaurant and bar workers.

As a city councilor, Wu authored an adopted ordinance which provided paid parental leave to municipal employees. Before the passage of the ordinance by the City Council, Wu and Mayor Marty Walsh co-authored an op-ed in The Boston Globe that called paid parental leave, "a must for working families".

=== Transit ===
Wu advocated for late night public transit in her original platform when running for City Council in 2012. In this vein, in 2015, she voiced her support for having the MBTA extend its pilot "late-night T" program, which kept transit service open late on the weekends.

Wu is a supporter of fare-free public transit. Wu argued in a January 31, 2019 op-ed published in The Boston Globe that the MBTA should explore the elimination of transit fares, writing

Eliminating financial barriers must be one of the big ideas we explore, because geographic mobility underlies economic mobility. Access to public transit is more than just a calculus about the number of cars taken off the road. Cities that have adopted free public transportation have benefited from a surge in transit equity, with more low-income residents, seniors, and youth using transit to access opportunities. In a city and region where income inequality and racial disparities reflect our geographic segregation, cost and unreliability of public transportation adds an additional barrier for youth, people of color, and everyone who has been left out of the prosperity of our city. Removing this barrier would unleash the full potential of our workforce and talent from every neighborhood.

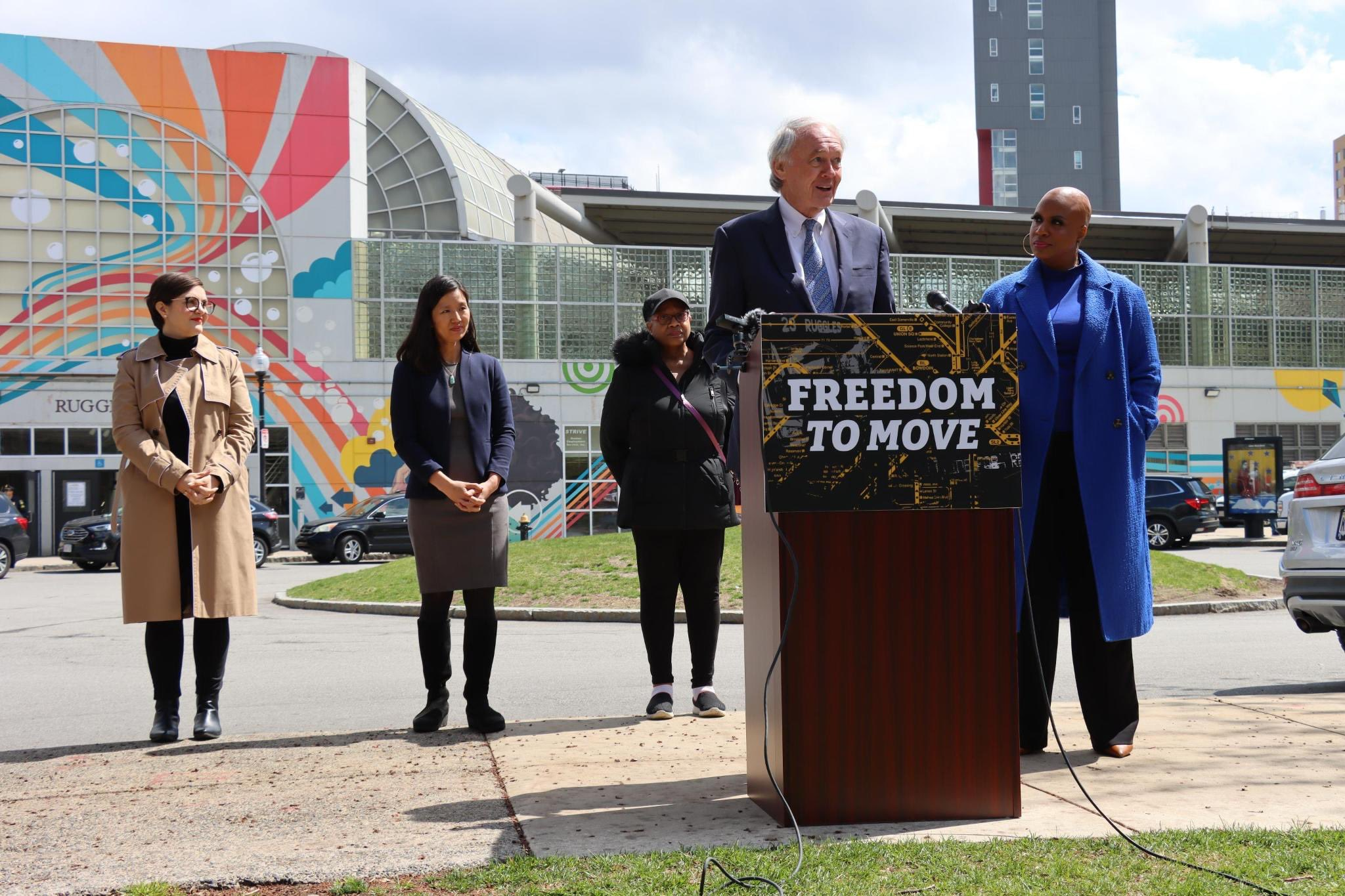
Wu (second from left) stands with Senator Ed Markey (second from right), Congresswoman Ayanna Pressley (far right), and others at a press conference for the Freedom to Move Act that would provide federal funding for fare-free public transport

She further argued that Boston should set an example for the rest of the county in free access to transit, likening it to past municipal innovations the city introduced. Wu's 2020 proposal for a municipal Green New Deal incorporated her proposal for fare-free public transit.

Wu has supported federal legislation on the matter of fare-free public transit, including helping Senator Ed Markey and Congresswoman Ayanna Pressley in 2020 to promote their proposed "Freedom to Move Act". The act would provide grants to communities that eliminate transit fares.

Wu's advocacy is regarded to have popularized the idea of fare-free public transportation in Boston. Crediting Wu as a leader on fare-free public transit, in January 2021, The Boston Globe's editorial board endorsed the idea of making the city's buses fare-free. Wu's promotion of fare-free public transit also inspired Lawrence, Massachusetts mayor Daniel Rivera to implement it in his city.

Both Kim Janey, as acting mayor, and Wu, as mayor, took steps that introduced fare-free transit on several bus routes in the city.

=== Recreational cannabis ===
In 2016, Wu supported Massachusetts Question 4 to legalize the recreational use of cannabis in Massachusetts. This put her at odds with Mayor Marty Walsh, who was a prominent opponent of legalization.

=== Government reform ===
As a city councilor, Wu voiced support for participatory budgeting. In 2020, she expressed support for the prospect of implementing ranked voting reform in Boston's city elections.

== Personal life ==
=== Caregiving of mother and siblings ===
When Wu was in her early twenties, having recently graduated from Harvard University, and living in Boston and working for Boston Consulting Group, her mother developed severe mental illness and was diagnosed with schizophrenia. Upon hearing that her mother was exhibiting erratic behavior, Wu returned home and thereafter became the primary caregiver of her mother and two youngest siblings (the youngest of whom was eleven-years-old).

Wu secured medical care for her mother. She also opened a teahouse, hoping her mother might recover enough to run it. Eventually, Wu entered Harvard Law School and relocated with her mother and youngest sibling to Boston. She became the legal guardian of her youngest sibling, and became actively involved in the sibling's education at the Eliot School of Boston (a public K–8 school). Wu has said that she regards the experience of assuming the care of her mother and younger siblings to have been the most important turning point of her life.

=== Marriage, children, pregnancies, religion ===
While attending Harvard College, Wu began a long-distance relationship with Conor Pewarski, having been introduced by mutual friends at a Harvard–Yale football game party that she hosted. Pewarski had been a Yale student. When Wu moved back to Chicago in order to help her mother and sisters following the onset of her mother's mental illness, Pewarski abandoned a fledging career in Hollywood film production and moved with her. When Wu attended Harvard Law School, he continued to live with her. Pewarski proposed to Wu on December 7, 2011, on Cambridge Common; they married on September 8, 2012. The couple now lives in Boston's Roslindale neighborhood with their two sons and her mother. Pewarski worked as a community lender at East Boston Savings Bank until resigning his position shortly after Wu took office as mayor, opting to become a stay-at-home parent after Wu became mayor.

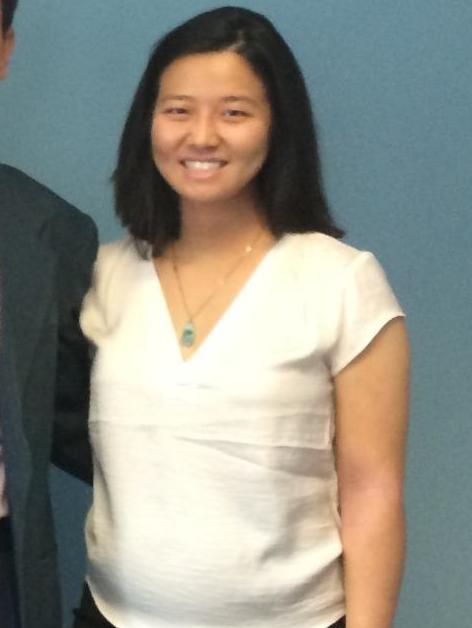
Wu in 2014, while pregnant with her first son. Wu was the first Boston City Council member to give birth while in office. After the births of her sons (while she was a city councilor), Wu opted to decline to take a maternity leave.

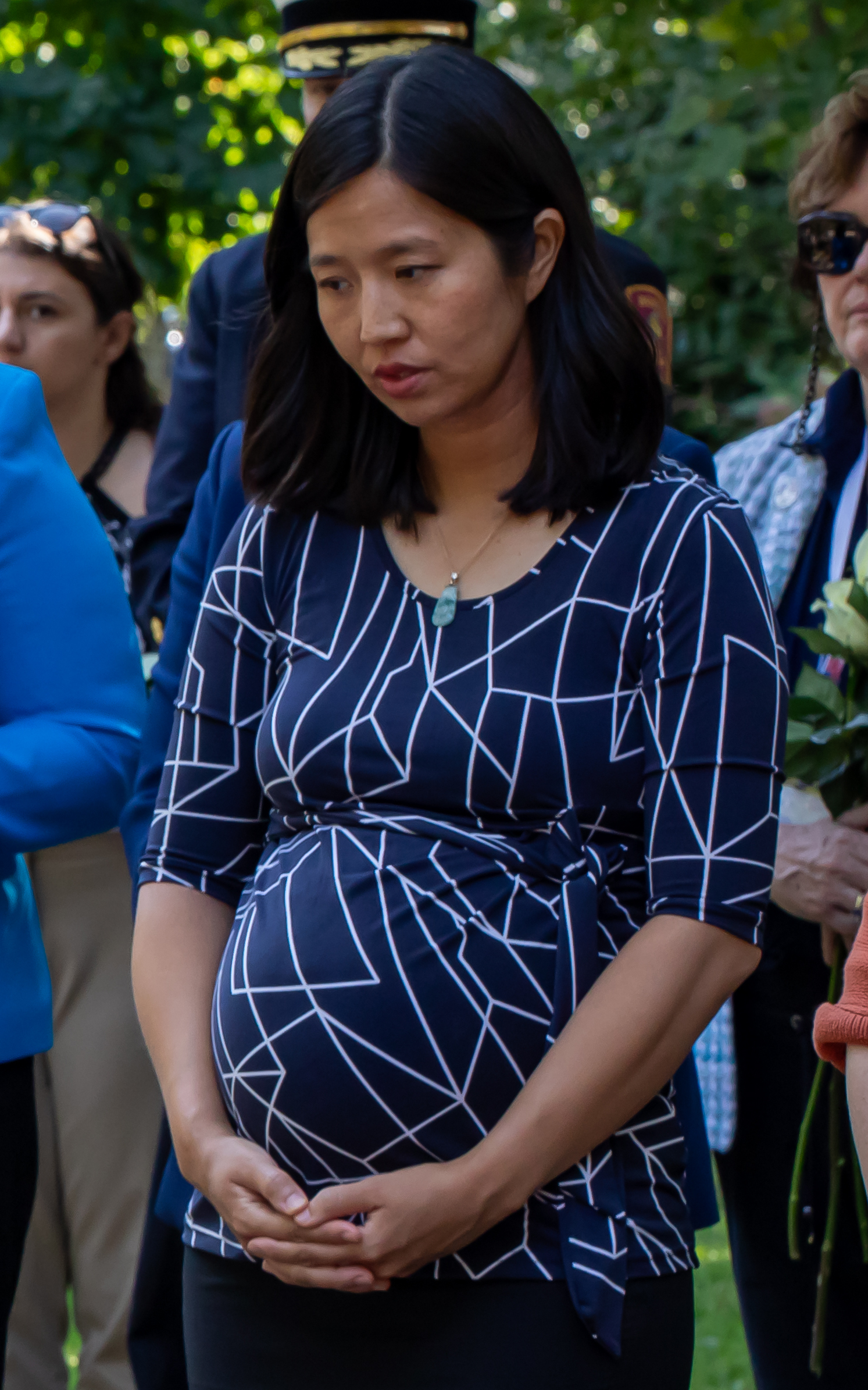
Wu in 2024, while pregnant with her daughter. She again declined to take maternity leave after her third pregnancy.

In December 2014, Wu gave birth to her oldest child, a boy, thereby becoming the first member in the history of the Boston City Council to give birth while in office. Her experience of learning that employees of Boston's government lacked the option of paid child leave inspired her successful ordinance to create such a policy. Wu's second son was born in 2017. Wu opted to forgo maternity leave. When she returned to work after each pregnancy, Wu brought her newborn sons with her to City Council meetings. As of 2024, Wu enrolls both of her sons in Boston's public school system.

In 2024, Wu shared that, in the years between the birth of her second son and her pregnancy carrying her youngest child, she had had two other pregnancies that had each ended in miscarriage. When speaking to delegates from New Hampshire during an event at the 2024 Democratic National Convention, Wu divulged further details on her experiences with pregnancy. Wu drew connections between her experiences and matters in contention amid a post-Dobbs legal landscape, including access to fertilization methods such as in vitro and access to medications such as Mifepristone (which can be used for medical abortion, and had been banned in many states post-Dobbs). Wu divulged that her current pregnancy has been conceived with the aid of "assisted reproductive technology". She also shared that one of her two miscarriages had been a so-called "missed miscarriage" that had occurred at an early stage of pregnancy. The remains of the fetus she was carrying was discovered during an ultrasound Wu had undergone to confirm whether she was pregnant. She further shared that following the discovery that she had had this miscarriage, she took Mifepristone and Misoprostol to aid her body in removing the fetal remains.

In late-July 2024, Wu announced that she was pregnant with a daughter and was due in January 2025. After working that morning, Wu gave birth to her daughter on January 13, 2025, and opted to not take formal maternity leave, adding that the "city runs and our services are ones that people rely on, 24 hours a day, 365 days a week, and I weigh in where I can and where I need to", describing her time as a "working leave". Her newborn daughter has traveled with her to meetings and events as she continued to work as mayor, resulting in Boston Magazine giving her daughter an honorable mention in May 2025 on its annual list of the "Most Influential Bostonians", calling Wu's infant daughter the city's "tiniest VIP".

=== Hobbies ===
Wu plays the piano, having started taking lessons when she was 4, and on her first day as mayor, had one put in her office at city hall. In May 2023, she performed the second movement of Mozart's Piano Concerto No. 21 with the Boston Symphony Orchestra. She took refresher lessons at Berklee College of Music prior to performing George Gershwin's Rhapsody in Blue as a guest soloist with the Boston Pops in September 2024. In November 2025, she played Bach's “Ave Maria” alongside Yo-Yo Ma at Boston's Symphony Hall.

== Electoral history ==
=== City Council ===
2013 Boston at-large City Council election
Candidate	Primary election		General election	
Candidate	Votes	%	Votes	%
Ayanna Pressley (incumbent)	42,915	16.71	60,799	18.30
Michelle Wu	29,384	11.44	59,741	17.98
Michael F. Flaherty	39,904	15.54	55,104	16.59
Stephen J. Murphy (incumbent)	31,728	12.35	44,993	13.54
Annissa Essaibi George	12,244	4.77	30,538	9.19
Jeffrey Michael Ross	13,939	5.43	28,879	8.69
Martin J. Keogh	15,743	6.13	26,500	7.98
Jack F. Kelly III	11,909	4.64	23,967	7.22
Catherine M. O'Neill	10,952	4.26		
Althea Garrison	10,268	4.00		
Ramon Soto	9,928	3.87		
Philip Arthur Frattaroli	5,832	2.27		
Gareth R. Saunders	5,363	2.09		
Christopher J. Conroy	3,433	1.34		
Seamus M. Whelan	3,118	1.21		
Francisco L. White	2745	1.07		
Douglas D. Wohn	2,382	0.93		
Frank John Addivinola Jr.	2,240	0.87		
Keith B. Kenyon	1,950	0.76		
Jamarhl Crawford	21†	0.01		
all others	832	0.32	1,658	0.50

† write-in votes

2015 Boston at-large City Council election
Candidate	Votes	%
Ayanna Pressley (incumbent)	31,783	24.21
Michelle Wu (incumbent)	28,908	22.02
Michael F. Flaherty (incumbent)	26,473	20.16
Annissa Essaibi George	23,447	17.86
Stephen J. Murphy (incumbent)	19,546	14.89
Jovan J. Lacet write-in	95	0.07
Charles Yancey write-in	39	0.03
Jean-Claud Sanon write-in	25	0.02
Andrea Campbell write-in	13	0.01
all others	959	0.73

2017 Boston at-large City Council election
Candidate	Votes	%
Michelle Wu (incumbent)	65,040	24.47
Ayanna Pressley (incumbent)	57,520	21.64
Michael F. Flaherty (incumbent)	51,673	19.44
Annissa Essaibi George (incumbent)	45,564	17.14
Althea Garrison	18,253	6.87
Domingos DaRosa	11,647	4.38
William A. King	8,773	3.30
Pat Payaso	6,124	2.30
all others	1,230	0.46

2019 Boston at-large City Council election
Candidate	Primary election		General election	
Candidate	Votes	%	Votes	%
Michelle Wu (incumbent)	26,622	19.41	41,664	20.73
Annissa Essaibi George (incumbent)	18,993	13.85	34,109	16.97
Michael F. Flaherty (incumbent)	18,766	13.68	33,284	16.56
Julia Mejia	10,799	7.87	22,492	11.19
Alejandra Nicole St. Guillen	11,910	8.68	22,491	11.19
Erin J. Murphy	9,385	6.84	16,867	8.39
Althea Garrison (incumbent)	9,720	7.09	16,189	8.05
David Halbert	6,354	4.76	13,214	6.57
Martin Marty Keogh	6,246	4.55		
Jeffrey Michael Ross	5,078	3.70		
Priscilla E. Flint-Banks	4,094	2.98		
Domingos DaRosa	2,840	2.07		
Michel Denis	2,108	1.54		
William A. King	1,809	1.32		
Herb Alexander Lozano	1,510	1.10		
all others	766	0.56	704	0.35

=== Mayor ===
2021 Boston mayoral election
Candidate	Primary election		General election	
Candidate	Votes	%	Votes	%
Michelle Wu	36,060	33.40	91,794	63.96
Annissa Essaibi George	24,268	22.48	51,125	35.62
Andrea Campbell	21,299	19.73		
Kim Janey (acting incumbent)	21,047	19.49		
John Barros	3,459	3.20		
Robert Cappucci	1,185	1.10		
Jon Santiago (withdrawn)	368	0.34		
Richard Spagnuolo	286	0.26		
Scattering	0	0.00	595	0.41
Total	107,972	100	144,380	100

2025 Boston mayoral election
Candidate	Primary election		General election	
Candidate	Votes	%	Votes	%
Michelle Wu (incumbent)	66,859	71.85	78,977	93.24
Josh Kraft	21,481	23.08	1,128 (Note: Kraft withdrew before general election and was not included on the ballot, votes cast for him were write-in votes)	1.33
Domingos DaRosa	2,428	2.61	114 (Note: votes cast in general election for DaRosa were write-in votes, as he was not included on the general election ballot)	0.13
Robert Cappucci	2,091	2.25	57 (Note: votes cast in general election for Cappuci were write-in votes, as he was not included on the general election ballot)	0.07
Scattering	201	0.22	4,426	5.22
Total	93,060	100	84,722	100

== Publications ==
=== Articles ===
- Open Up The Conversation' on 2024 Olympics, WGBH, January 16, 2015
- The Road to Fear-Free Biking in Boston, The Boston Globe, July 11, 2016
- Forget Fare Hikes – Make the T Free, The Boston Globe, January 31, 2019
- Don't Just Fix the Infrastructure, Let's Rethink Our Transit Policies, The Boston Globe, October 18, 2019 –co-authored with Ayanna Pressley and Stacy Thompson
- Freedom to Move Act Would Increase Mobility, Connect Communities, Assist Economic Recovery, MassLive, July 1, 2020 –co authored with Ayanna Pressley and Ed Markey
- Taking On Our Housing Crisis, Mission Hill Gazette, July 2, 2021
- My Thoughts on Boston Public School Meals, Charlestown Patriot-Bridge, September 21, 2023
- Massachusetts Should Ban Third-Party Electric Suppliers, The Boston Globe, September 29, 2024 –co-authored with Andrea Campbell

== See also ==
- List of first women mayors in the United States
- List of mayors of the 50 largest cities in the United States

Political offices
Preceded by Bill Linehan	President of the Boston City Council; 2016–2018	Succeeded by Andrea Campbell
Preceded by Kim Janey; Acting	Mayor of Boston; 2021–present	Incumbent
