= Carol Rose =

Carol Rose may refer to:

- Carol Rose (lawyer), executive director of the American Civil Liberties Union of Massachusetts
- Carol Rose (horse breeder) (born 1941), champion horsewoman and breeder
- Carol M. Rose, law professor
