= Michael Cox (police officer) =

Former American police officer (born 1965)

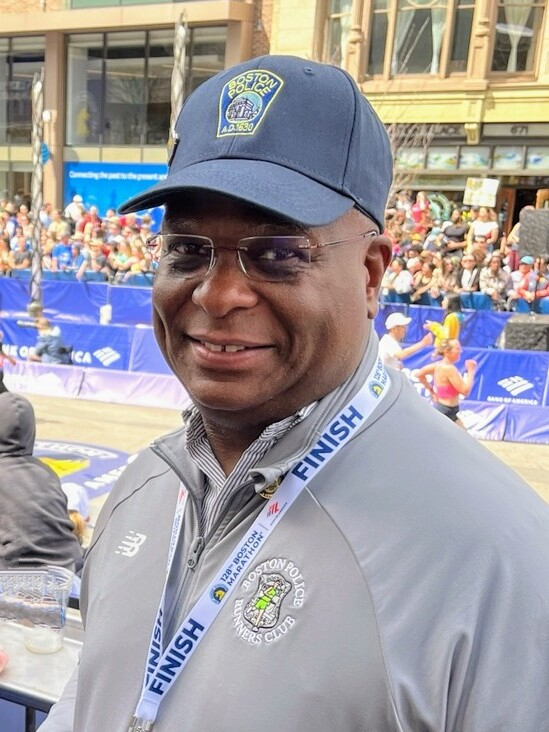
- Cox at the 2024 Boston Marathon

44th Commissioner of the Boston Police Department
- Incumbent
- Assumed office August 15, 2022
- Mayor: Michelle Wu
- Preceded by: Dennis White; Gregory Long (acting)

Chief of the Ann Arbor Police Department
- In office September 2019 – July 31, 2022
- Preceded by: Jim Baird; Robert Pfannes (interim)
- Succeeded by: Andre Anderson; Aimee Metzer (interim)

Personal details
- Born: June 17, 1965 (age 61) Boston, Massachusetts, U.S.
- Children: 3 (including Michael Jr.)
- Education: Morehouse College; Providence College (cont. ed.); Curry College (MA); Boston University (MBA)

Military service
- Years of service: BPD: 1989–2019; AAPD: 2019–2022; BPD: 2022–present
- Rank: BPD: all ranks from Officer to Superintendent; AAPD: Chief of Police; BPD: Commissioner (Note: The police commissioner is a City of Boston position appointed by the Mayor of Boston; the highest rank within the Boston Police Department proper is Superintendent-in-Chief.)

Michael A. Cox Sr. (born June 17, 1965) is an American police officer, currently serving as the commissioner of the Boston Police Department. He previously was the chief of police in Ann Arbor, Michigan, from 2019 until 2022.

Cox was raised in the Roxbury neighborhood of Boston. Before being appointed Ann Arbor's police chief in 2019, Cox served approximately 30 years as an officer in the Boston Police Department. In 1995, Cox (working in plainclothes) was mistaken by fellow officers for a suspect during a chase, and was seriously beaten by fellow officers in a notable police brutality incident. Cox reached a financial settlement with the department and continued to work as an officer. He worked his way up to Superintendent, the second-highest rank in the department, before departing for Ann Arbor in 2019. He returned to Boston in 2022 to serve as the city's police chief.

== Early life ==
Mike Cox was born in mid-1965 at Beth Israel Hospital in Boston to David and Bertha Cox. The youngest of six children in an African-American family, he was raised in the Roxbury neighborhood of the city. Cox's father, David, was the first Black person to own a Boston-based landscaping company. His mother, Berta, worked for thirty years as a wire sorter at Raytheon in Waltham, Massachusetts. Cox's parents met and married while living in Tennessee, and had resided in Boston for more than a decade by the time of Cox's birth. They were middle-class and homeowners, owning a relatively large two-family residence. Cox's grandparents also resided in the home. The Cox family home was located in Dudley Square (today known as Nubian Square), an area that in the 1970s and 1980s experienced higher levels of unemployment, homelessness, and crime. In the early 1970s, the city built a new police station and courthouse serving Dudley Square on a lot that abutted the Cox family's backyard. As a youth, Cox became acquainted with some of the officers who worked there. This, combined with his affinity for television shows about police, inspired him to later pursue a career in law enforcement.

Cox attended private school in Brookline, then the private Milton Academy for one year, where he faced class-based discrimination. He moved to Wooster School in 1981 and was admitted to Providence College in 1984. Cox frequently saw his differences from other private school students as the result of a class divide and not a race divide. He finished his college education at Morehouse College, an HBCU in Atlanta. After graduating from college, he took a civil service exam to begin a career in law enforcement.

== Initial tenure at the Boston Police Department ==
Cox joined the Boston Police Department (BPD) in 1989, after graduating from college. From then until 2019, Cox spent approximately 30 years as a police officer in the department. Over the course of his initial tenure at the department, he rose through the ranks, ultimately becoming Deputy Superintendent in 2013. Cox twice received the Boston Police Department Medal of Honor, in addition to other department commendations.

=== Early career ===
Cox joined BPD in 1989. When he joined the department, he befriended many white officers and was regarded as "color-blind" in his own views on race.

==== 1995 beating of Cox by fellow officers ====
In the early 1990s, around the that time Cox first joined the police force, levels of crime were high in Boston's majority-minority neighborhoods. The BPD's internal culture regarded loyalty as more important than adherence to the protocols taught in training, which resulted in widespread brutality and a code of silence ("blue wall of silence"). BPD officers frequently used stop and frisk tactics on black men and women, and beat black men with impunity. Officers lying under oath (perjury) to cover up such incidents was common. A mayoral blue-ribbon commission to reform the police and a permanent injunction placed by a judge had both failed to change police culture.

While doing plainclothes work as an officer in training, Cox was twice mistaken by other police for a suspect and briefly beaten. In one of these incidents, he was purposefully hit by a police vehicle and then pinned by officers to a wall. He recovered quickly both of these times and decided not to file complaints.

In 1995, while Cox was working in plainclothes, his car was at the front of a high-speed chase in pursuit of gang members suspected of homicide. The chase involved several cars from the BPD and other departments. Cox left his vehicle to pursue the suspect on foot, and was again mistaken by other officers for a suspect. He was badly beaten by four officers and hospitalized, suffering a serious brain injury. After the officers realized his actual identity (upon one officer noticing a police badge under Cox's jacket), they quickly abandoned him, still bleeding on the sidewalk. It took Cox six months to recover from many of the physical injuries he incurred.

Cox learned only from newspaper reports that involved officers had failed to report the incident, and has recounted that he became upset after discovering the efforts by the officers to coverup what had occurred. Before he ultimately decided to file a complaint, Cox began receiving harassing phone calls from other officers seeking to intimidate him. For the next four years, Cox sought formal acknowledgement and apology for what had taken place. In pursuit of this, he ultimately brought a lawsuit against BPD over the incident, breaking years of internal silence within the department on such misconduct. This defied the department's so-called "blue wall of silence." While seeking justice for his beating, Cox was rendered a social pariah within the department, and faced threats and harassment from colleagues. However, he remained committed to his job as and officer and refused to leave. The lawsuit Cox brought ultimately resolved with a settlement from BPD, with Cox receiving $900,000 in damages and $400,000 in attorneys' fees. However, no officer admitted to the beating. Following the legal battle, three of the officers were eventually fired; but one, Dave Williams, successfully sued for unjust termination and was returned to the service in 2006. Williams was again fired for brutality in 2009, but reinstated after that. As of 2023, Williams was still with the department, assigned to domestic violence cases. Additional involved officers did not face firing.

The incident and its aftermath was the subject of the book The Fence, written by author and former reporter Dick Lehr of The Boston Globe. Lehr has opined that, in Boston, the incident of which Cox was the victim was "one of the worst cases of police brutality in modern times."

Cox has expressed that he does not harbor continued resentment about the experience. After being appointed chief of the department in 2024, he remarked that while he regards himself to have been a victim of "unconstitutional policing", he does not view this experience as defining himself,

The reality is, I was a victim of that, but that's not who I am. I spent 24 years in the Boston Police Department after that incident, and in that time, I've gone to school multiple times and, got multiple degrees, focused a lot of concern and effort around making the police department better so we can serve the public in ways that are make us more effective and efficient.

=== Continued work and promotions ===
After the lawsuit was settled, Cox remained in the BPD and continued to work his way up in the department through promotions. Lehr has opined that Cox's continued presence within the department served as an important implicit reminder of the 1995 incident and the systemic culture that had fostered it, importantly preventing the department from forgetting about it. Lehr has opined, "The fact that he stayed, that the story did become a big story and a big lawsuit, sensitized the city and some in the command staff that the power of the blue wall of silence is something that needed to be confronted."

Cox worked as a sergeant detective in the department's intelligence unit. He also worked on assignment to protection details for visiting dignitaries, served as a liaison to the United States Secret Service, and was a supervisor assigned to the city's Joint Terrorism Task Force. In 1997, Cox completed a continuing education program at Providence College.

In the early 2000s, Cox began serving in the department's Bureau of Investigative Services, in which role he oversaw the bureau's forensics division. Cox's supervisor at the bureau, Paul Joyce, has credited Cox as being instrumental in reforms that were made to his division which modernized how the department conducted forensic investigation.

=== Deputy Superintendent and Superintendent (2013–19) ===
In 2013, Commissioner Kathleen O'Toole promoted Cox to the rank of Deputy Superintendent. Within a few years, he was further promoted to Superintendent, the second-highest rank in the BPD. As a bureau chief, Cox headed the as Bureau of Professional Development and the Boston Police Academy from 2018 until leaving the department in 2019 to accept a position in the Ann Arbor Police Department.

Around this time, Cox decided to continue his education. He has cited his interest in fixing the shortcomings of police departments as his primary motivation for returning to university, as he wanted to receive further relevant education both about criminal justice and running organizations. He earned a master's degree in criminal justice, and an MBA from the Questrom School of Business at Boston University.

== Chief of the Ann Arbor Police Department (2019–22) ==
In June 2019, Cox had received the recommendation of Ann Arbor, Michigan's Independent Community Police Oversight Commission to serve as the Ann Arbor Police Department's new chief of police. Two other candidates were seeking also the position. In July 2019, his appointment was unanimously confirmed by the Ann Arbor City Council. He was sworn in as chief in September 2019.

Cox's interest in working in Ann Arbor in part arose from an interest in the experience of heading a department with a smaller police force than Boston's (Ann Arbor had approximately 120 police officers compared to the more than 2,000 BPD had).

During his tenure, Cox faced the challenges of leading the department in navigating the COVID-19 pandemic and George Floyd protests. Nathan Clark of mLive wrote towards at end of Cox's tenure in Ann Arbor, "While Ann Arbor Police Chief Michael Cox only served with the city a short time, his tenure has been marked by successes, challenging times and controversy."

=== Transparency and community policing ===
Increasing the department's transparency with the public was a central focus of Cox during his tenure in Ann Arbor. When he had been interviewed for the position in March 2019, Cox had expressed his support for public transparency and opined that Ann Arbor's Police Oversight Commission played an important role in bridging Ann Arbor's divide between police and the public. The Ann Arbor City Council tasked Cox with expanding the city's community policing initiatives, and Cox worked to re-engage and grow citizen crime watch groups.

=== 2020 administrative leave ===
In February 2020, Cox was temporarily placed on administrative leave due to personnel concerns involving allegations that Cox created a hostile work environment and that employees feared retaliation, as well as separate accusations of insubordination. The concerns primarily emerged from a dispute between Cox and a department employee over the firing of a department colleague.

A review judged the accusations overall to have been unfounded. The investigation commissioned by the city concluded that there was no evidence of Cox behaving in a manner that would have created a hostile work environment, but did find that (regardless of Cox's intent) there was evidence that some employees feared retaliation by him with a legitimate basis. After the conclusion of the investigation, Cox was reinstated.

Cox admitted he had made some mistakes in communicating with others in the department. He cited his failure to adjust to the difference in the culture surrounding communication in the Boston Police Department (located in a large East Coast city) versus that of Ann Arbor (located in a smaller Midwestern city). He acknowledged that he needed to better his communication.

=== Departure ===
Cox's tenure in Ann Arbor ended on July 31, 2022, when he left for Boston. While Cox had, as chief, sought to repair the department's relationship with the city council, The Boston Globe reported that by the end of his tenure he lacked support from several members of the city council. The newspaper also reported that Cox lacked support among some members of his own police department staff. However, Ann Arbor Mayor Christopher Taylor expressed that he was sorry to see Cox leave the department.

== Chief of the Boston Police Department (2022–present) ==
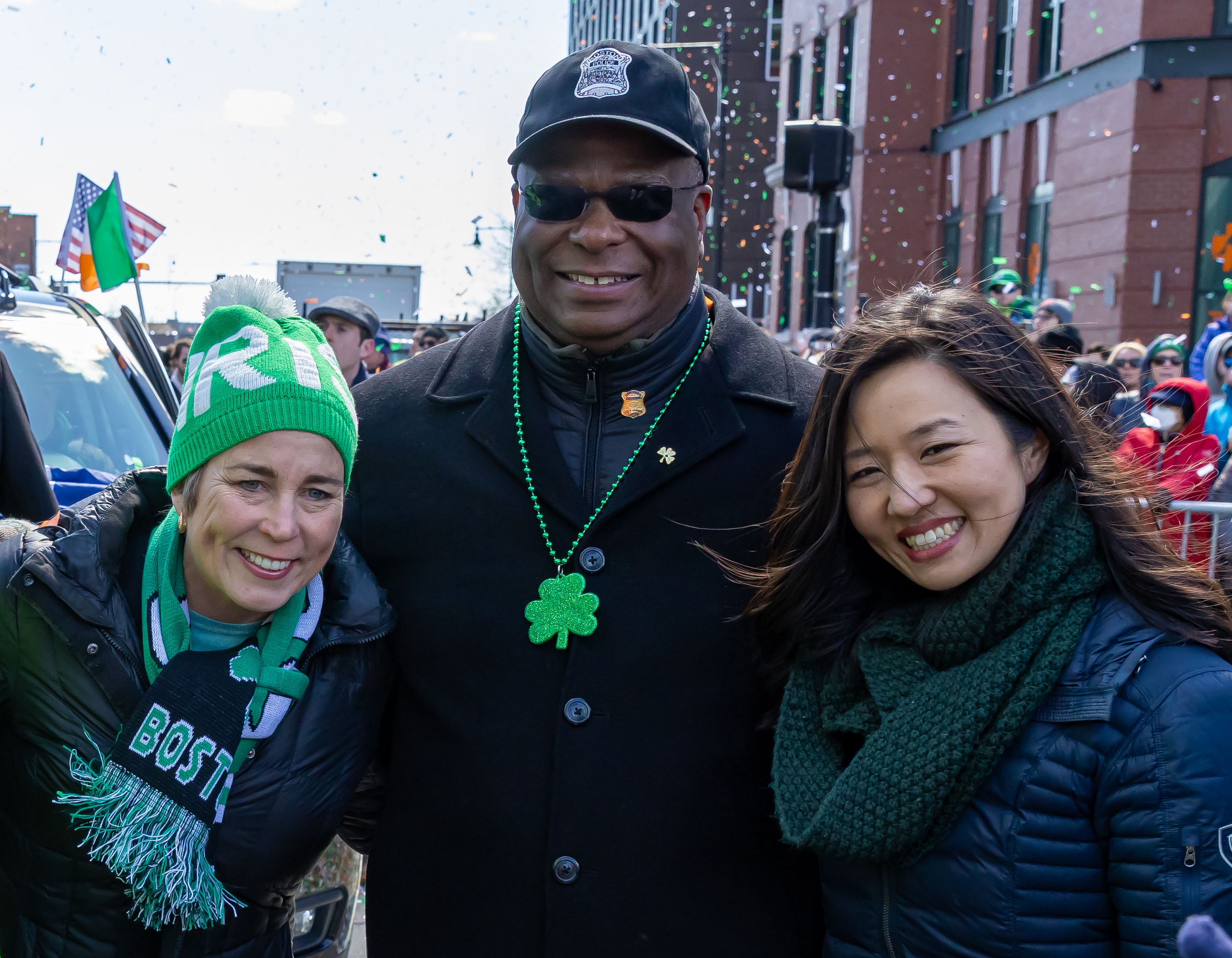
Cox (center) with Massachusetts Governor Maura Healey (left) and Boston Mayor Michelle Wu at the 2023 South Boston St. Patrick's Day Parade

In July 2022, Cox was announced as the incoming commissioner of the Boston police by the Mayor of Boston, Michelle Wu. His selection as the new police chief came after a seven month search process for a new chief, which included community feedback and interviews with candidates. A five-member search committee (headed by Geraldine Hines, former justice of the Massachusetts Supreme Judicial Court) first narrowed the field to four finalists before selecting him as their recommendation to the mayor. Mayor Wu, a political progressive, had won a large victory in her election in 2021, having run with a campaign platform which included plans to reform the city's approach to public safety by emphasizing community oversight and restorative justice. She appreciated Cox's support for similar initiatives in his previous work in Boston and Ann Arbor, and agreed with her search committee's recommendation that he was the best candidate before them.

Cox was officially sworn in on August 15, 2022. His leadership style has been characterized as "soft-spoken" but "assertive."

Cox has expressed support for diversifying the demographic makeup of the BPD, an effort that the Massachusetts Association of Minority Law Enforcement Officers and Mayor Wu have both advocated for.

Cox has faced some criticism for often rejecting disciplinary recommendations made by the civilian review board.

=== Violence reduction ===
In early 2023, the city government (under Mayor Wu) set a goal of reducing the city's annual homicide rate by 20% by 2026. Over the course of 2023, Boston experienced the fewest homicides it had seen in any year on record. 2023 also saw a new record low for gun violence rates in the city. In 2024, the city's homicide rate fell significantly further, reaching a record low; local law enforcement hailed the year as one of the city's safest years on record. Murder rates in Boston have been characterized as "plummeting." The number of shooting fatalities was noted to have greatly decreased over the previous three years. By the end of 2024, the city had exceeded its objective of reaching a 20% reduction in annual homicides ahead of schedule. By 2024 and 2025, data indicated that Boston was safer than many similarly-sized cities in the United States. An article published by the Vera Institute of Justice in September 2024 found Boston is one of the safest major cities in the United States, noting

The city has made headlines throughout the past year for its public safety numbers. No statistic is more remarkable than 2024's plummeting homicide rate. In the first quarter of 2024, Boston led major United States cities in year-to-date homicide declines, dropping 82 percent. Extended through June 30, data showed homicide numbers for 2024 had fallen by 78 percent compared to the same time in 2023. Now, on the cusp of autumn, the downward trend persists...Just a year after city leaders announced a plan to diminish annual homicides by 20 percent by 2026—32 incidents or less—they are more than making good on the goal.

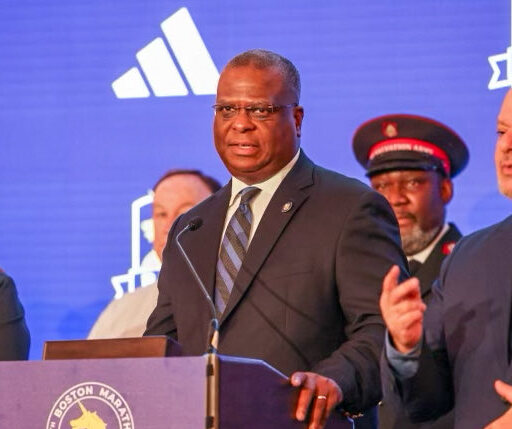
Cox speaks at a press conference held in advance of the 2024 Boston Marathon

The Vera Institute credited Boston's violence reduction to implementation of agency-based public safety efforts, hospital-based public safety efforts, and community-based public safety efforts. It also noted that while Boston was leading other cities in its rate of homicide reduction, it was coinciding with a national trend of declining homicide rates, opining, "although its homicide statistics are striking, Boston’s public safety landscape is not a complete outlier, but rather a prominent example of a nationwide downward trend and the work behind it." Other experts have credited the city's Violence Intervention and Prevention Initiative among other municipal programs as driving a reduction in crime. In December 2024, an article published by the United States Conference of Mayors hailed Boston as "the safest big city in America" and "a model of urban safety," observing that "a big part of Boston’s push to reduce crime centers around community. The Mayor’s Office, Boston Public Health Commission, Boston Police Department, and other agencies created a network that treats violence as a public safety and public health issue."

In the first half of 2025, Boston homicide rates increased from the year prior. However, its rates were still similar to rates in the first-half of 2023, a year which had previously been a record-low year for murders in the city. Crime researcher Thomas Abt observed, "Boston's success in driving gun violence downward now means that small increases in homicides look large in percentage terms. Overall, the city's anti-violence efforts are a success." The year 2025 ended with an increase in homicide over the preceding year's record low, but with what still ranked among the lowest annual homicide rates in the city's history.

=== Efforts to combat non-violent crimes ===
During Cox's tenure, the police department has also prioritized several non-violent crimes in its crime reduction efforts. This has included a focus on reducing retail theft. This has also included efforts to decrease the presence of drugs, homelessness, and crime at the intersection of Mass and Cass.

Cox has also prioritized cracking down on reckless operation of motor scooters, considering it both detrimental to quality-of-life in the and a traffic hazard. In late December, he reported that the department's officers had seized more than 840 scooters over the course of the year, 160 of which were seized in the downtown. This was a 22% increase in the number of seized scooters compared to the preceding year.

=== Disputes with the Second Trump Administration ===
After Donald Trump was sworn-in for a second non-consecutive term as U.S. president in 2025, the Boston city government and the BPD found itself at odds with the Second Trump administration over diversity, equity, and inclusion (DEI) within the BPD; the status of the state of public safety in Boston; strategies the BPD was using to recruit new officers; and the BPD's adherence to the Boston Trust Act (so-called "sanctuary city" law).

On September 4, 2025, Trump's Attorney General Pam Bondi filed a lawsuit in the United States District Court for the District of Massachusetts arguing that the city's continued adherence to the Boston Trust Act was a violation of federal law. The lawsuit names BPD and the City of Boston (as well as Cox and Mayor Wu in their official capacities) as defendants.

== Cox's positions on police reform ==
Cox generally agrees that American police departments need reform. Cox has expressed the viewpoint that departments need reforms in order to become more responsive to community input and to foster an internal culture of transparency, and to remove a culture which encourages cover-ups.

Cox opposes the notion of "defunding the police." After the slogan gained prominence amid the George Floyd protests of 2020, Cox challenged it:

At a time when the public, rightly so, [has a] higher expectation as far as our service that we [the police] provide…it's the exact same time that people seem to be asking for us to have less resources. Show me a scenario where there's an institution anywhere in the world where it gets better when you don't fund it.

== Personal life ==
While a student at Moorehouse, Cox met Kimberly Nabauns, a student at Spelman College (an HBCU and women's college, also located in Atlanta). The two began a relationship and married. During their relationship, both began demanding jobs: Cox entered policing, and Nabauns began a career in medicine as an anesthesiologist at a hospital in Brockton, Massachusetts). They had three children; the eldest, Michael A. Cox Jr., played running back professionally for the New York Giants and in college for the Michigan Wolverines and the UMass Minutemen. Having visited Ann Arbor to watch Michael Jr.'s home games at the University of Michigan, Cox was acquainted with the city prior to becoming its chief of police. As of April 2024, Cox and his wife remained married.

In May 2025, Cox was the commencement speaker at the ceremony for graduates of Providence College's graduate and continuing education students.

== Notes ==
Police appointments
Preceded by Dennis White	Commissioner of the Boston Police Department; August 15, 2022 – present	Succeeded by Incumbent
