= Michael Cox (running back) =

American football player (born 1988)

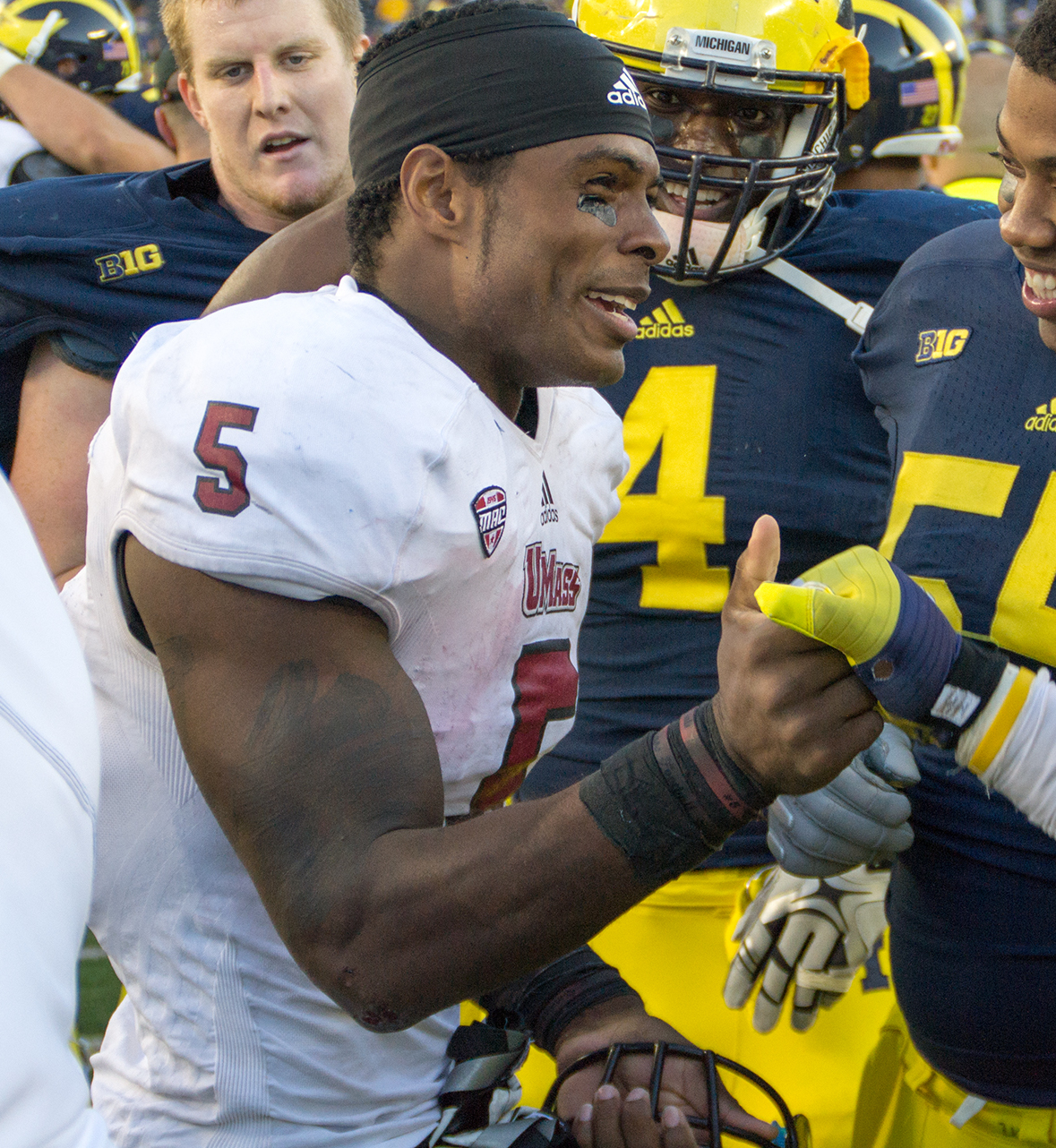
- Cox with the Massachusetts Minutemen in 2012

No. 29
- Position: Running back / Return specialist

Personal information
- Born: November 14, 1988 (age 38); Boston, Massachusetts, U.S.
- Listed height: 6 ft 0 in (1.83 m)
- Listed weight: 220 lb (100 kg)

Career information
- High school: Avon (CT) Old Farms
- College: Michigan; Massachusetts
- NFL draft: 2013: 7th round, 253rd overall pick

Career history
- New York Giants (2013–2014)

Career NFL statistics
- Rushing yards: 76
- Rushing average: 2.9
- Receptions: 5
- Receiving yards: 21
- Stats at Pro Football Reference

Michael A. Cox Jr. (born November 14, 1988) is an American former professional football player who was a running back for the New York Giants of the National Football League (NFL). He played college football as an undergraduate for the Michigan Wolverines, and as a graduate student for the Massachusetts Minutemen. He was selected by the Giants in the seventh round of the 2013 NFL draft.

== Early life ==
A native of the Dorchester neighborhood of Boston, Massachusetts, Cox is the son of police officer Michael A. Cox Sr. Cox attended high school at Avon Old Farms prep school in Avon, Connecticut, graduating in 2008. In three seasons at Avon Old Farms, Cox rushed for 2,400 yards, including a junior season in which he rushed for 1,000 yards and 16 touchdowns. Ranked by most publications as a four-star prospect, Cox signed a national letter of intent with the University of Michigan. Along with Khaseem Greene, who later played for the Chicago Bears, Cox was part of Avon Old Farms' first-ever New England track championship team.

== College career ==
After redshirting for the 2008 season, Cox saw limited action on the Wolverines roster from 2009 to 2011. Cox played in 15 games over three years, rushing for 169 yards and two touchdowns. Cox' best single game for the Wolverines was during his redshirt freshman season, against Delaware State when he rushed for 82 yards and two touchdowns.

Cox graduated from Michigan in the spring of 2012. With one year of eligibility remaining, Cox transferred to the UMass Minutemen to play as a graduate student. Since Cox had already obtained his undergraduate degree, he was not required to sit out a season under NCAA transfer guidelines. Cox served as the feature back for the Minutemen. He started all 12 games, and despite running behind an inexperienced offensive line, Cox rushed for 715 yards and five touchdowns, leading the team in both categories. Against Miami of Ohio, Cox recorded the best game of his career with 188 yards rushing on 30 carries and two touchdowns. Cox also registered 81 yards against his former team, Michigan.

== Professional career ==
Cox was selected by the New York Giants with the 253rd pick, in the seventh round of the 2013 NFL draft. Cox made his first professional start on Monday Night Football on October 21, 2013. He was waived on April 27, 2015.

== Personal life ==
In November 2013, a New York Times report revealed events about Cox that not only the Giants organization was unaware of, but that Cox himself had not fully become aware of until he was 13 years old. The report detailed how Cox's father, Michael A. Cox Sr., then a Boston police officer, had been the victim of a mistaken but vicious beating by fellow police officers in 1995. The incident was initially "swept under the rug", but a lawsuit ultimately led to BPD settling with Cox Sr. for $900,000 in damages and attorneys' fees. Cox Sr. became the force's 44th commissioner on August 15, 2022. In May 2025, Cox married veteran and fitness model Taylor Spadaccino.

Cox's mother, Kimberly, is an anesthesiologist, and he is the eldest of her and Cox Sr.'s three children. Michael's younger brother Nicholas Cox is a former football player at the Division I-AA University of Maine and briefly tried out for the Baltimore Ravens after going undrafted in 2014.

=== Medical malpractice lawsuit ===
In 2016, Cox sued Dr. Dean Lorich and the NewYork-Presbyterian Hospital's Hospital for Special Surgery over unspecified damages due to a failed ankle surgery in 2014. Cox attributed this failed surgery to ending his NFL career. Dr. Lorich, who died by suicide in December 2017, was the hospital's chief of orthopedic trauma service at the time the surgery took place. On September 23, 2022, Cox was awarded $15.5 million for future pain and suffering, $12 million in lost earnings, and $1 million in past pain and suffering, for a total of $28.5 million. Jordan Merson, the attorney representing Cox's attorney, said the jury stated that Cox "received inadequate medical care and treatment and was significantly injured as a result".
