= Shirley Leung =

American journalist at The Boston Globe

- Education: Princeton University (BA)
- Occupation: Journalist
- Employer: The Boston Globe

Shirley Leung is an American journalist who covers business, especially as it relates to innovation and growth, politics, gender, and race. She is an associate editor at The Boston Globe, where she writes a twice-a-week business column and is host of the weekly Globe Opinion podcast "Say More with Shirley Leung".

== Early life ==
Leung grew up in Bel Air, Maryland. In 1994, she received a bachelor of arts degree in East Asian Studies from Princeton University.

== Career ==
Leung was a reporter for The Baltimore Sun, which she has called her "hometown paper", from 1994 to 1996. She worked at The Boston Globe from 1996 to 1998 as a general assignment and police reporter. From 1997 to 2004, she was a business reporter at The Wall Street Journal and worked in its Boston, Chicago, and Los Angeles bureaus.

In 2004, Leung returned to The Boston Globe in the roles of senior assistant business editor and then assistant managing editor for business. In 2013, she became the Globe's business columnist. In that role, she has been called "a provocateur who seems to enjoy taking controversial stands—most notably, advocating for the Olympics to come to town".

In 2018, when Boston magazine ranked Leung number 42 in its list of the 100 Most Influential People in Boston, the magazine wrote, "Whether they agree or disagree with Leung, people read her—and what she writes about gets talked about. When she lambasted WEEI's 'notoriously offensive' jock talk, companies canceled their ads on the station. Local organizations know that Leung will call them out if they fail to put women in top positions."

From 2018 to 2019, Leung was the interim editorial page editor at the Globe, making her the fifth woman and the first person of color to have that role in the Globe's 142-year history.

In 2019, she resumed her post as Globe business columnist.

In 2023, Leung launched the weekly Globe Opinion podcast "Say More with Shirley Leung". Guests have included Federal Reserve Bank of Boston president Susan M. Collins, Massachusetts Institute of Technology president Sally Kornbluth, former Harvard University president Drew Gilpin Faust, and journalist Kara Swisher.

== Awards ==
Leung was a finalist in the commentary category of the Gerald Loeb Awards for Distinguished Business and Financial Journalism in 2015, 2017, 2018, and 2022 and was named a Best in Business Honoree by the Society for Advancing Business Editing and Writing in 2018 and 2022, receiving honorable mention in the Commentary/Opinion category.
