= Carol Rose (lawyer) =

American lawyer

- Education: Stanford University; London School of Economics; Harvard Law School
- Employer: American Civil Liberties Union of Massachusetts

Carol Rose is an American lawyer and civil rights advocate. She is the Executive Director of the American Civil Liberties Union of Massachusetts, a non-profit and nonpartisan organization and state affiliate of the national American Civil Liberties Union (ACLU). With over 82,000 supporters across Massachusetts and more than 100,000 online activists, the ACLU of Massachusetts works to defend and protect the rights and liberties guaranteed in the U.S. Constitution and the Massachusetts Declaration of Rights.

== Education ==
Carol Rose earned a BA from Stanford University, MSc from the London School of Economics, and JD from Harvard Law School.

== Career ==
Rose began her career as a journalist with United Press International in London, then with The New York Times, where she worked with R.W. Apple, Jr., the Chief Washington correspondent. She then worked as a foreign affairs editorial writer and reporter for The Des Moines Register, writing editorials and columns on international relations and U.S. foreign policy, including multi-series reporting from Japan and Israel. During the run-up to the 1988 presidential race, Rose hosted a Democratic Party presidential candidate debate.

Following her time in Iowa, Rose was awarded a fellowship from the Institute of Current Affairs to live and write in South Asia on cultural, legal, and political issues. She published more than 35 long-form journalism pieces on issues such as the daily life of Afghan women in Purdah, religious minorities in Islam, and the plight of refugees from Burma, Bhutan, Bangladesh, Afghanistan and Tibet. In 1993, Rose returned to the United States and earned her JD from Harvard Law School in 1996, serving as co-editor of the Harvard Human Rights Journal.

Rose was a law clerk to United States Federal District Court Magistrate Patti Saris and was an attorney at the Boston law firm of Hill & Barlow, where she specialized in First Amendment and media law, intellectual property, Internet, and civil rights law. While at Hill & Barlow, Rose served as co-chair of Women in Communications Law of the American Bar Association’s (ABA) Forum on Communications Law, as Vice Chair of the Human Rights committee of the ABA Individual Rights and Responsibilities section, and on the editorial board of the ABA’s Human Rights magazine.

=== ACLU of Massachusetts ===
In 2003, Rose became the Executive Director of the ACLU of Massachusetts. Under her leadership, the ACLU of Massachusetts has worked to defend and strengthen civil rights and liberties for all across the state with a focus on immigrant rights, bodily autonomy, LGBTQ rights, racial justice, freedom of religion and belief, data privacy, voting rights, and more. To do this work, the organization files lawsuits and amicus briefs, advocates with local and state elected leaders for effective policies, mobilizes local communities, and provides extensive civic education, including Know Your Rights trainings. The group frequently works in coalition with organized labor, reproductive rights groups, members of the immigrant community, and more.

Some of Rose’s early accomplishments at the ACLU of Massachusetts include defending the freedom of speech by dissenters and members of the press speaking on federal abuses of power and lawbreaking in 2006 and as part of coalition efforts to defend equal marriage rights for lesbian and gay couples in the state legislature in 2007.

Rose also launched the ACLU of Massachusetts Technology for Liberty Project, and the organization is highly respected for protecting privacy and individual liberties in the digital age. Some important victories include securing the right to record police officers performing official duties and guaranteeing privacy protections for people’s sensitive location information stored on cell phones. In September 2025, the Massachusetts Senate passed comprehensive data privacy legislation.

During the first and second Trump presidencies, the ACLU of Massachusetts has led challenges to several of the administration’s most high-profile policies, including family separation and attacks on immigrants without due process. In addition, the ACLU of Massachusetts played a leadership role in winning passage of one of the strongest shield laws in the nation, protecting both patients and providers of reproductive and gender-affirming health care.

Under Rose’s leadership, the organization also worked with other ACLU affiliates to challenge President Trump’s attempts to end birthright citizenship, restrict mail-in voting, and cancel scientific grants relating to LGBTQ+ health, among other issues. The ACLU of Massachusetts also represented Rümeysa Öztürk, a PhD student at Tufts University who was arrested by masked federal agents outside her apartment and held in detention for weeks. In public statements, Rose asserted that the government violated Öztürk’s free speech rights, targeting her for arrest because she had co-written an op-ed in the college newspaper advocating for Palestinian rights. During the second Trump administration, Rose also led the ACLU of Massachusetts in co-organizing major protests in Boston and surrounding cities, including the No Kings series of rallies.

The ACLU of Massachusetts remains dedicated to protecting the right to vote for all citizens. The BIPOC to the Ballot Box initiative, launched in 2023, aims to increase voter awareness and engagement in communities with large Black Indigenous, and People of Color communities. In the leadup to the 2024 Presidential Election, the ACLU of Massachusetts trained nonpartisan poll monitors and staffed an Election Protection Hotline.

With Rose at the helm, the ACLU of Massachusetts has also achieved victories defending the right of Black Lives Matter protestors to march and speak out, fighting for equal access to reproductive health care for poor women, proposing reforms to police practices to confront racial bias, and challenging indefinite detention without due process for immigrants.

Rose is a frequent guest on GBH Radio “Boston Public Radio” show, as well as the WHMP radio program “Talk the Talk.” She was a founding Director of the Partnership on AI and served as a Trustee to the Institute of Current World Affairs.

== Select Op-eds and TV Appearances ==
- "The Revolutionary Power of ‘We’." ACLU of Massachusetts. (May 19, 2026)
- "CityLine: What are your rights as a protester?" WCVB Channel 5 Boston. (January 30, 2026)
- "Resisting the Trump agenda leaves no room for despair." WBUR Cognoscenti. (January 14, 2026)
- "We can’t arrest our way out of Mass. and Cass." The Boston Globe. (September 29, 2021)
