= LGBTQ history in Massachusetts =

Lesbian, gay, bisexual, and transgender (LGBT) persons have been present throughout the history of the US state of Massachusetts. A 2018 report by Boston Indicators and The Fenway Institute found that Massachusetts had the second-largest LGBT population in the country by percentage, behind Vermont, at roughly 5% of the state population.

LGBT individuals and communities became more visible in the state starting in the 1970s, coinciding with the gay liberation movement. The state capital, Boston, was home to multiple LGBT organizations and publications beginning at this time. The state's first known Pride march was held in Boston in 1971. Same-sex sexual activity was illegal in the state until 1974.

In 2004, Massachusetts became the first US state to grant marriage licenses to same-sex couples after the decision in Goodridge v. Department of Public Health, and the sixth jurisdiction worldwide, after the Netherlands, Belgium, Ontario, British Columbia, and Quebec.

In politics, Massachusetts boasts a number of LGBT firsts, including the first openly LGBT politician elected to a state legislature (Elaine Noble, 1975), first out congressperson (Gerry Studds, 1983), first congressperson to voluntarily come out (Barney Frank, 1987), first transgender person elected to a state legislature (Althea Garrison, 1992), first openly lesbian African-American mayor in the country (E. Denise Simmons, 2008), first openly LGBT state attorney general (Maura Healey, 2014), and first openly lesbian governor (Maura Healey, 2022).

== Legal history of same-sex activity ==
=== 1636–1692 ===
In October 1636, Reverend John Cotton submitted a legal code for Massachusetts Bay, which included the death penalty as a crime for sodomy, adultery, incest, and other offenses. The code was not adopted. In November 1636, Plymouth listed sodomy as an offense "punishable by death" and quoted verbatim from Leviticus 20:13. In August 1637, John Allexander and Thomas Roberts were found guilty by a Plymouth court of sodomy. Roberts was later charged, in 1637 of "disorderly living". The law only applied to men. In 1641, Nathaniel Ward's code was enacted instead. The code also prohibited sodomy, with discussions between colony leaders about the definition of "sodomy" and "sodomitical acts".

A terminological update of a 1672 Massachusetts law, in 1697, changed sodomy to a crime called "buggery", which also included bestiality, defining it as "detestable and abominable" and "contrary to the very Light of Nature", and remained a capital crime. Years prior, Reverend Samuel Danforth of Duxbury anonymously published a sermon on "sins of Sodom" after the execution of Benjamin Goad for bestiality led to "criticism in Massachusetts of the late 1600s". The law remained in effect until 1785.

Scholars disagreed on the reasons and effectiveness for these laws. Scholar Robert F. Oaks argued that changes to sodomy laws, which implemented "strict legal procedures", reduced the number of convictions and arrests for "homosexual activity". He also stated that decline in religious fervor, inability of earlier efforts to stop "illicit sex", and secularization of the state, resulted in fewer prosecutions for "variant sexual activity". Colin L. Talley, a public health scholar, concluded that in British North America, including Massachusetts, statutes against sodomy were "largely unenforced", with ambivalence toward "same-sex eroticism", and stated that such behavior was common while historian Edmond S. Morgan stated that 17th century New England records give the impression of "fairly common" illicit sexual intercourse. He added that offenders were not treated as severely as codes of law would "lead one to believe". Historian Roger Thompson noted three convictions for sodomy in Plymouth between 1636 and 1649, and said that cases in Massachusetts during the 17th Century were "rare". He disagreed with Morgan and Oaks, arguing that homosexual behavior was infrequent and "hardly ever occurred". Scholar John M. Murrin stated that treatment of men or boys "accused of sodomy" in New England mirrored practices in other parts of British North America. He also argued that bestiality was an "abomination and obsession" of those in 17th century New England.

=== 1780–1915 ===
The Massachusetts Constitution of 1780 included a provision making sodomy a crime, based on the Buggery Act 1533 in the United Kingdom.

In 1805, the death penalty for sodomy was removed, with the punishment changing to one year of solitary confinement and ten years of hard labor. Massachusetts law was revised again in 1835 to eliminate solitary confinement as a punishment, but increasing the sentence for sodomy to twenty years of hard labor.

In the case of Commonwealth v. Snow, in January 1873, the Massachusetts Supreme Judicial Court ruled against James A. Snow, who was indicted on charges of sodomy against young boys. In 1879, a Massachusetts law was passed which prohibited the sale of any "instrument or other article intended to be used for self abuse" which was intended at masturbation but also included sex toys. The Massachusetts legislature enacted a law in 1887 which prohibited "unnatural and lascivious acts" and aimed at oral sex, with the first case under this law decided in 1894. In the case, Commonwealth v. Dill, the Massachusetts Supreme Judicial Court stated that the indictment that a defendant committed "a certain unnatural and lascivious act" was sufficient. In another case under the 1887 law, Commonwealth v. Delano, in 1908, the Massachusetts Supreme Judicial Court stated that "any and all unnatural and lascivious acts" were outlawed. In 1915, the Massachusetts legislature passed a law which prohibited using any saloon, café, or restaurant "for the purpose of immoral solicitation or immoral bargaining". In 1918, the legislature revised the 1887 law, lowering the penalty of those convicted from 3 years to 2 1/2 years.

=== 1920–1992 ===
In January 1921, in the case of Commonwealth v. Porter, the Massachusetts Supreme Judicial Court upheld a conviction of an individual for "maintaining a nuisance" where "indecent and unnatural acts" took place. The court also concluded that they saw "no error of law in the ruling" or in conduct of the trial which resulted in the conviction. The state enacted a law in 1923 which permitted a trial judge to bar the public from trials in which those under age 17 are victims of any crime "involving sex". The age was changed to 18 in 1931. Massachusetts statues, from 1939 to 1945, required notice to police "data about any person convicted of sodomy" about to be released from a prison, and filing of mental health report on those "arrested for sodomy" before bail. In 1954 and 1959, the Massachusetts Supreme Judicial Court ruled in favor of the existing sodomy laws. In the case of Jaquith v. Commonwealth in 1954, the court stated that the existing sodomy statute was constitutional and the court permitted sodomy convictions "based largely on circumstantial evidence" in the 1959 case of Commonwealth v. Marshall

In 1972, a proposed criminal code for Massachusetts was published, which would have repealed "crime against nature" and "unnatural and lascivious acts" laws, but the code was never enacted. In the same year, in Commonwealth v. Balthazar, the Massachusetts Supreme Judicial Court ruled that the statute which prohibited "any unnatural and lascivious act with another person" was inapplicable to "private, consensual conduct of adults". In the cases of Commonwealth v. Scagliotti (1977) and Commonwealth v. Ferguson (1981), the Massachusetts Supreme Judicial Court overturned convictions for "an unnatural and lascivious act". The court, in 1980, in Commonwealth v. Sefranka, ruled against police actions which attempted to entrap gay men. In the 1984 case of Commonwealth v. Bloom, the Massachusetts Court of Appeals upheld the conviction of Frederick Bloom for "engaging in consensual sexual relations" in a public area. The court argued there wasn't a "reasonable expectation" of privacy for Bloom. In 1992, the police raided a private home in Boston where a police officer saw 160 men "engaging in an evening of mutual masturbation", resulting in a police raid in which people were arrested on charges of obscenity and "operating a house of ill fame."

=== 1992–present ===
In the case of Doe v. Attorney General (1997), the Massachusetts Supreme Judicial Court ruled that a man convicted of engaging in "unnatural acts" on an undercover officer could not suffer legal consequences without due process. The case was remanded to the court in 1999, which concluded that a "individualized hearing is required". In 2001, Gay & Lesbian Advocates & Defenders (GLAD), a group of lawyers who "represent gay and lesbian interests in court", sued the Massachusetts Attorney General and two District Attorneys, challenging both statutes. The Massachusetts Supreme Judicial Court dismissed the case on February 21, 2002, because the plaintiffs did not present an instance of prosecution and therefore failed to meet the Court's "actual controversy requirement". The Court noted that the defendants' stipulation "that their offices will not prosecute anyone under the challenged laws absent probable cause to believe that the prohibited conduct occurred either in public or without consent" satisfied the Court's holding in Commonwealth v. Balthazar with respect to §35. It also extended its holding that "consensual conduct in private between adults is not prohibited" to apply to §34.

== Pre–17th century ==
Although historians attest that Native American tribes in southern New England had more liberal attitudes towards sex and sexual relationships than the European colonists did, their attitudes towards homosexuality and gender nonconformity are uncertain. This is due to the lack of European records, as many of the indigenous communities in the area had been devastated by disease prior to the arrival of Europeans there, and the communities remaining there had been largely driven out, killed, or assimilated by 1700.

== 1620–1899 ==
=== 1620–1699 ===
The Plymouth and Massachusetts Bay Colonies were founded by the Pilgrims and Puritans, who were known for their adherence to strict social and gender hierarchies. Religious beliefs restrained sexual relations to only be within marriage and for procreative purposes. Laws were passed to require unmarried members of the colonies to live within established households, in an effort to ensure that sexual behavior was controlled. Furthermore, sexual behavior outside of these limits, including sodomy, was seen as a political crime, in that it might bring God's wrath down on the state itself.

Records of trials for sodomy or same-sex indecency were fairly rare, and executions for the act even more so; only two executions for sodomy were reported in the entirety of New England. This may have partially been due to the requirement of having two witnesses to convict the crime. However, many court documents do document trials for 'lewd' activities, which would not have been punishable by death. In Plymouth County, the first trial for same-sex indecency between two men was held in 1636. In 1642, a Plymouth court charged Edward Michell and Edward Preston with "lewd & sodomitical practices" but were whipped rather than executed, as was Elizabeth Johnson for a same crime, along with a fine. The only known description of two women engaging in sex from this period comes from 1649, when Plymouth residents Sarah White Norman and Mary Hammon were charged with "lewd behavior…upon a bed".

In 1648, Sarah White Norman and Mary Vincent Hammon, of Massachusetts, were prosecuted for "lewd behavior with each other upon a bed"; their trial documents are the only known record of sex between female English colonists in North America in the 17th century, and may be the only conviction for lesbianism in American history. Hammon was only admonished, possibly because she was only 15 years old at the time of the charges. Sarah, who was probably 10 years older, stood trial. She was convicted in 1650 and required to acknowledge publicly her "unchaste behavior" with Mary, as well as warned against future offenses.

In 1695, a state law (c. 2, §7, 1 A&R 208, 210) was passed which prohibited men or women from crossdressing. However, Massachusetts residents had been taken to court over crossdressing prior to the law's passage, including Haverhill resident Joseph Davis in 1652, Essex County resident Dorothie Hoyt in 1677, and Middlesex County resident Mary Henly in 1692, whose behavior was said to be "confound[ing] the course of nature".

=== 1700–1799 ===
In January 1712, a Black man named Mingo, who was enslaved to Wait Winthrop, was executed for the crime of "buggery". In 1755, a Massachusetts soldier named Bickerstaff, at Lake George, received a sentence of 100 lashes for swearing and a "sodomitical attempt", and was publicly humiliated, but not executed.

In 1764 on Nantucket, resident Anna Luce of Tisbury reported a pregnancy by her friend, Deborah Lewis. Lewis, who had been known as a woman to the residence of Nantucket since childhood, began dressing in men's clothing and going by the name Francis Lewis. Anna and Francis married, ultimately going on to have five children.

In April 1771, an advertisement in a Boston newspaper calling for the return of an enslaved person, Cato, who was "well known by the name of Miss Betty Cooper".

In 1771, the Suffolk Inferior Court and, later, Superior Court, decided the case of Gray v. Pitts. Lendall Pitts of Boston assaulted John Gray after realizing Gray, although appearing to be a woman, was a man. Gray was found innocent of guilt or provocation in the resulting court case, and Pitts was forced to pay Gray £18 in compensatory damages. The case was regraded by contemporary historians as an example of the "gay panic" defense and an early case regarding cross-dressing in Colonial America. The case has been documented and included in the Legal Papers of John Adams, since John Adams was appointed as the attorney for Pitts and Josiah Quincy Jr. as the attorney for Gray.

=== 1800–1899 ===
In the mid-1800s, Rebecca and Mary West of Chilmark took on the names William and Luther West and began living as men.

In 1866, a church committee of men was formed to investigate reports that Horatio Alger had sexually molested boys. Alger did not deny the charges and he left for New York City.

In June 1868, Samuel M. Andrews was indicted by the Massachusetts Supreme Judicial Court for the murder of Cornelius Holmes, his "dear friend and long–term companion", with the sexual nature of the crime generating public attention. Scholar Leslie Margolin pieced together the relationship between the two men, noting the intimacy of their relations, their cohabitation, that Holmes' attorneys barred any evidence of sodomy between the two during the trial, and noted that Andrews had a "spirit-crushing religious fear" which led to panic, then murder of Holmes.

== 20th century ==
=== 1920–1969 ===
During two weeks in May and June 1920, an ad hoc disciplinary tribunal headed of five administrators at Harvard University, and headed by acting dean Chester Noyes Greenough. They conducted more than 30 interviews behind closed doors and took action against eight students, a recent graduate, and an assistant professor for charges of homosexual activity. They were expelled or had their association with the university severed. Two of the students were later readmitted. It was not revealed until 2002. U.S. history scholar George Chauncey said that the gay life at Harvard was "typical" as was the reaction of the university. This ad hoc tribunal was later written about by William Wright in his 304-page book, Harvard's Secret Court: The Savage 1920 Purge of Campus Homosexuals.

In the 1930s, Bostonian Prescott Townsend testified multiple times at the State House in favor of a bill decriminalizing same-sex activity.

In 1948, the Boston Licensing Board banned "female impersonators" from performing on stage.

In the 1950s, Prescott Townsend founded the Boston chapter of the Mattachine Society, and began appearing on radio shows to advocate repealing bans against same-sex sex and laws "pertaining to chastity, morality, and good order".

In 1952, selectman of Provincetown, Massachusetts enacted laws that banned drag shows and forbade restaurants and bars from becoming "habitual gathering place for home-sexuals of either sex", but the laws were ineffective at preventing this.

In the early 1960s, Prescott Townsend formed the homophile group the Demophile Society; in 1969, some members split off from the group to form the Homophile Union of Boston (HUB). That same year, the Boston chapter of the lesbian organization the Daughters of Bilitis was founded.

=== 1970–1979 ===
The 1970s saw the founding of multiple LGBT publications based out of Boston, including Fag Rag (1971 to 1987), and Gay Community News (1973–1999), which was published by The Bromfield Street Educational Foundation for the Boston LGBT community. Both publications shared office space. In 1976, the lesbian-feminist run Pomegranate Productions (later renamed Persephone Press) was founded in Watertown, where it would remain until 1983, when they sold to Beacon Press.

By 1970, several colleges and universities in and near Boston hosted chapters of the Student Homophile League. In June of that year, Boston held its first Gay Liberation Week; the city's first Pride march was held the next year in 1971.

In 1972, the first known gender-affirming surgery in the state was performed at the Cambridge City Hospital on an intersex woman. Gender Identity Service (GIS), which served the transsexual community, opened in April 1974.

From 1974 until 1980, the Combahee River Collective, a Black feminist and lesbian organization, was active in Boston.

In 1975, Boston voters elected Elaine Noble, an out lesbian, to the state legislature, making her the first out LGBT person to be elected to any state legislature. That same year, Fantasia Fair was founded in Provincetown; by 2016 it was the longest-running transgender event in the world.

In November 1978, Gay and Lesbian Advocates and Defenders (GLAD) was founded by a group meeting at Boston's Old West Church in response to a series of arrests of men in the bathrooms of the Boston Public Library.

In 1979, the Gay Father's Coalition (later renamed the Family Equality Council) was founded in the state.

=== 1980–1989 ===
The 1980s saw the founding of two Boston-based theater companies aiming to perform and promote works by and about the LGBT community: Triangle Theater Company, in 1980, and The Theater Offensive in 1989.

1980 saw the founding of three Boston-area LGBT organizations: the Boston Area Lesbian and Gay History Project in February 1980, the Boston Alliance of Gay, Lesbian, Bisexual, and Transgender Youth, and Men of All Colors Together (Boston).

The Boston Gay Men's Chorus was founded in 1982. In May of that year, the first Lesbian and Gay Liberation March was held in Northampton, which would later become Noho Pride.

Gerry Studds, a Massachusetts representative, became the first openly gay Congressman following the 1983 congressional page sex scandal, although his sexuality was already known to some of his constituents.

In 1983, the AIDS Action Committee was founded as a subset of the Fenway Community Health Center; it became a separate organization in 1986. Also in 1983, the Sexual Minorities Archives, originally founded in 1974 in Chicago, were relocated to Northampton.

In 1984, the Harvard Gay and Lesbian Caucus was founded at Harvard University; their initial goal was to pressure Harvard to include sexual orientation in its non-discrimination policy. Also that year, the Boston LGBT Film Festival was founded. As of 2016, it was the fourth oldest LGBT film festival in the country.

In 1985, The East Coast Bisexual Network was founded in Boston.

In 1987, Massachusetts representative Barney Frank became the first member of congress to voluntarily come out while in office.

In late 1987, Massachusetts activists organized MASS ACT OUT, whose aim was to fight homophobia and to criticize the response of mainstream society to the AIDS crisis. The next year, several organizations with similar aims were founded, including Boston ACT UP, Boston PWA, and the Women and AIDS Network. COLAGE, an organization for children with LGBT parents, was founded in the state in 1988.

In 1989, Massachusetts became the second state after Wisconsin to prohibit discrimination based on sexual orientation in "credit, public, and private employment, union practices, housing, and public accommodations". In May 1989, a protest was held outside the Boston headquarters of Blue Cross/Blue Shield, as the insurance company refused to cover gender-affirming surgeries or HRT which was being taken with the intent of later having a gender-affirming surgery.

=== 1990–1999 ===
In the early 1990s, Northampton gained a national reputation for its lesbian community.

In November 1992, Massachusetts voters elected their first openly LGBT state senator, Cheryl Jacques, and the first transgender person elected to a state legislature, Althea Garrison. Garrison's transgender identity was not public at the time of elections, and she was involuntarily outed by the Boston Herald following the election.

In 1994, the Massachusetts Area South Asian Lambda Association was founded. Although based in Boston, the organization served queer South Asians from across New England.

In 1995, the Family Equality Council held the first Family Week in Provincetown, an event aimed towards LGBT families.

In 1997, the Old Lesbian Oral Herstory Project was established at Smith College in Northampton.

Then-governor William Weld created the Massachusetts Governor's Task Force on Hate Crimes during his tenure; the task force was given permanent status by his successor, Paul Cellucci, in 1998.

== 21st century ==
=== 2000–2009 ===
In 2000, state senator Cheryl Jacques came out as a lesbian, making her the state's first openly LGBT state senator. Jacques was in her fourth term, having been first elected in November 1992. In 2002, Jarrett Barrios became the first openly gay man to be elected to the State Senate.

In 2001, the LGBT Aging Project was founded in Boston. The organization would be profiled in the 2010 documentary Gen Silent.

In 2003, Massachusetts became the first state in the country to recognize same-sex marriage following the ruling of state Supreme Court case Goodridge vs. Department of Public Health. The first marriage licenses for same-sex couples were issued in 2004.

In January 2008, E. Denise Simmons was sworn in at Cambridge, becoming the first openly lesbian African-American mayor in the country.

=== 2010–2019 ===
In 2011, then-governor Deval Patrick issued an executive order banning discrimination against transgender employees by the state or its contractors. In 2016, the Massachusetts Senate and House of Representatives approved a bill which would protect transgender individuals against discrimination in public accommodations.

In 2014, Maura Healey was elected as Massachusetts Attorney General, becoming the first openly LGBT person in the country to hold an attorney general position.

In 2015, History Unerased was founded in the state. It is, as of 2017, the only group licensed by the U.S. Department of Education to provide curricula on LGBT issues and history.

In 2017, the Sexual Minorities Archives were relocated to Holyoke from Northampton.

In 2019, Massachusetts became the 16th state to ban conversion therapy on minors. Also that year, Team Trans, an all-transgender and non-binary hockey team, thought to be the first of its kind in the country, was founded in Boston.

=== 2020s ===
The early 2020s saw a number of smaller Pride marches and festivals organized in Massachusetts towns and cities, including Hamilton, Lynn, Newburyport, Revere, Salem, Swampscott, Topsfield, and Wenham. In June 2022, Springfield held its first city-sponsored Pride parade.

In November 2022, Massachusetts elected its first openly LGBT governor, first woman governor, and the first openly lesbian governor in the country, Maura Healey.

== See also ==
- LGBT rights in Massachusetts
