= Deer Island Prison =

Prison in Massachusetts, US (1880–1991)

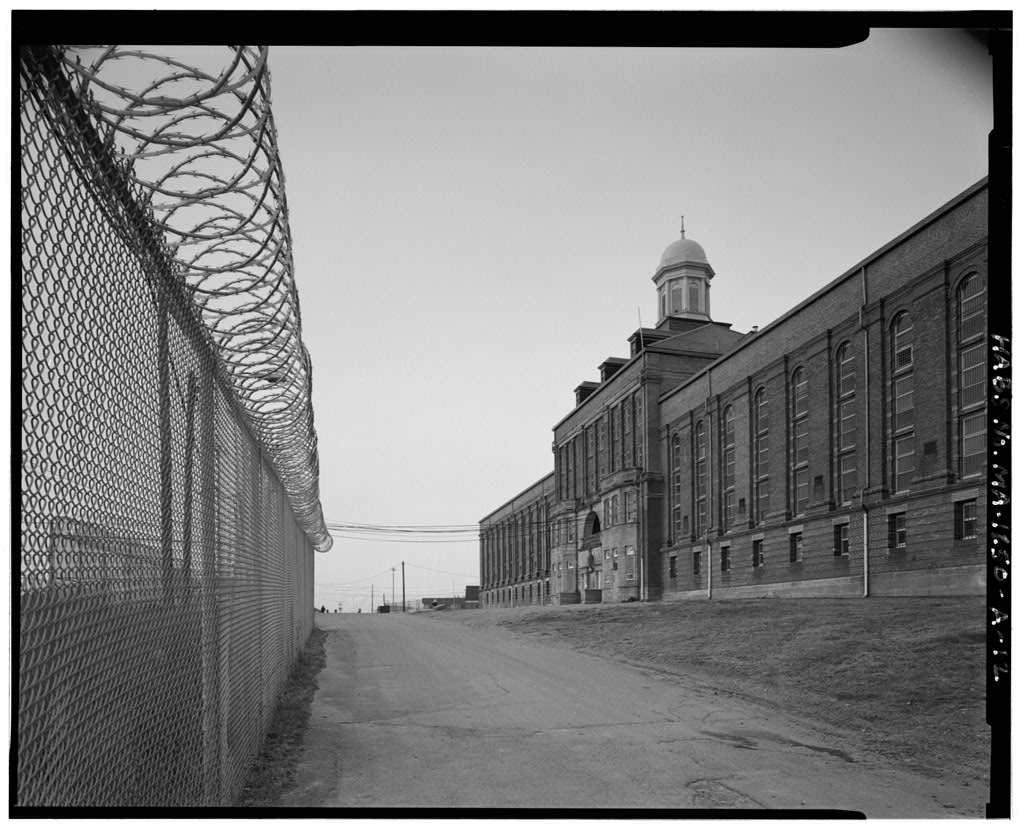
- Interactive map of Deer Island Prison
- Location: Deer Island; 42°21′12″N 70°57′43″W
- Status: Closed/Demolished
- Security class: Prison
- Opened: 1889
- Closed: 26 December 1991
- Managed by: Suffolk County Sheriff's Department

The Deer Island Prison (c. 1880–1991) in Suffolk County, Massachusetts was located on Deer Island in Boston Harbor. Once known as the Deer Island House of Industry and later, House of Correction, it held people convicted of drunkenness, illegal possession of drugs, disorderly conduct, larceny, and other crimes subject to relatively short-term sentencing. When it closed in 1991, some 1,500 inmates were being held at Deer Island.

== History ==
=== House of Industry ===
Originally, Deer Island's House of Industry (est. 1853) was an almshouse. It was one of several efforts on the island to accommodate poor children and adults. However, by around 1880 "without any change in the legal appellation 'House of Industry,' that term has come to be understood as designating its penal character."

An article in the national Frank Leslie's Sunday Magazine (1884) described the prisoners on Deer Island in the 1880s: "they in the main are from the lowest stratum of the cosmopolitan society of New England's metropolis, embracing representatives of almost every nationality under the sun, and from the shortness of the sentences, many being confined for 10 days only, for nonpayment of one dollar and costs for drunkenness, and none for more than a year."

=== House of Correction ===
Prior to 1896, the Suffolk County "House of Correction was located in South Boston. ... By Chapter 536 sec. 15 of the Acts of 1896 ... all the prisoners sentenced there were transferred to the former House of Industry on Deer Island. ... The last inmates were transferred from the South Boston facility by October 1902."

In the 20th century, the prison was administered by the Penal Institutions Department (c. 1941) and the Penal Commissioner of Boston (c. 1990). In 1991 about 880 inmates were transferred permanently to the Suffolk County House of Correction in Boston's South Bay area.

The Deer Island prison buildings were razed in 1992 to prepare for the construction of the Deer Island Waste Water Treatment Plant, an outcome of the Clean Water Act.

=== Noteworthy inmates ===
- Luigi Galleani
- John Runnings
- Prescott Townsend
- Margaret Brown, known as "Old Mother Hubbard"
- Oliver Garrett
- George H. Battis

== Cultural references ==
In Sylvia Plath's novel The Bell Jar, the protagonist, Esther Greenwood, visits Deer Island Prison. Plath also mentions the prison in her poem "Man in Black."

In Dennis Lehane's novel Mystic River, the character Jimmy Marcus served two years in Deer Island Prison in Winthrop.

In the film The Last Detail, the prison was used as the backdrop for Portsmouth Naval Prison. The prison was also shown in the 1978 motion picture The Brinks Job, starring Peter Falk.

== Alternative names ==
- Deer Island Jail, Winthrop
- Deer Island Penal Institution, Winthrop
- House of Correction at Deer Island
- Suffolk County House of Correction, Deer Island

== Images ==
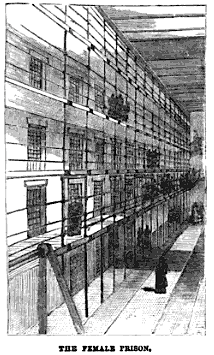
Women's prison, Deer Island, 1884

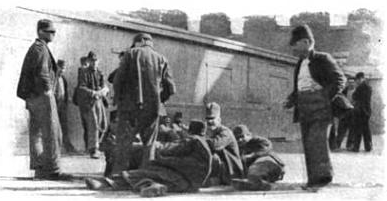
Inmates on Deer Island, 1898

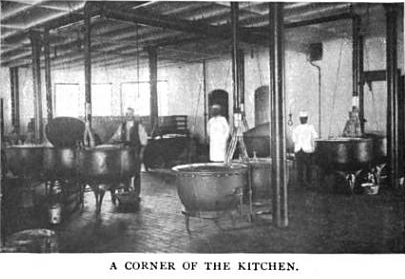
A corner of the kitchen, 1898

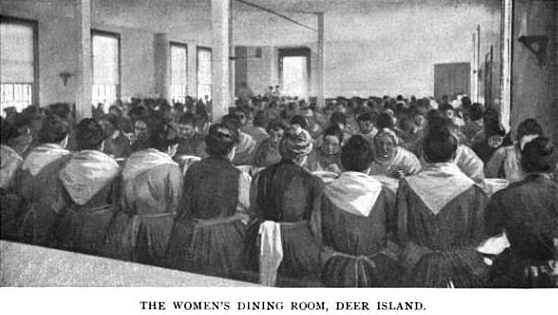
The women's dining room, 1898

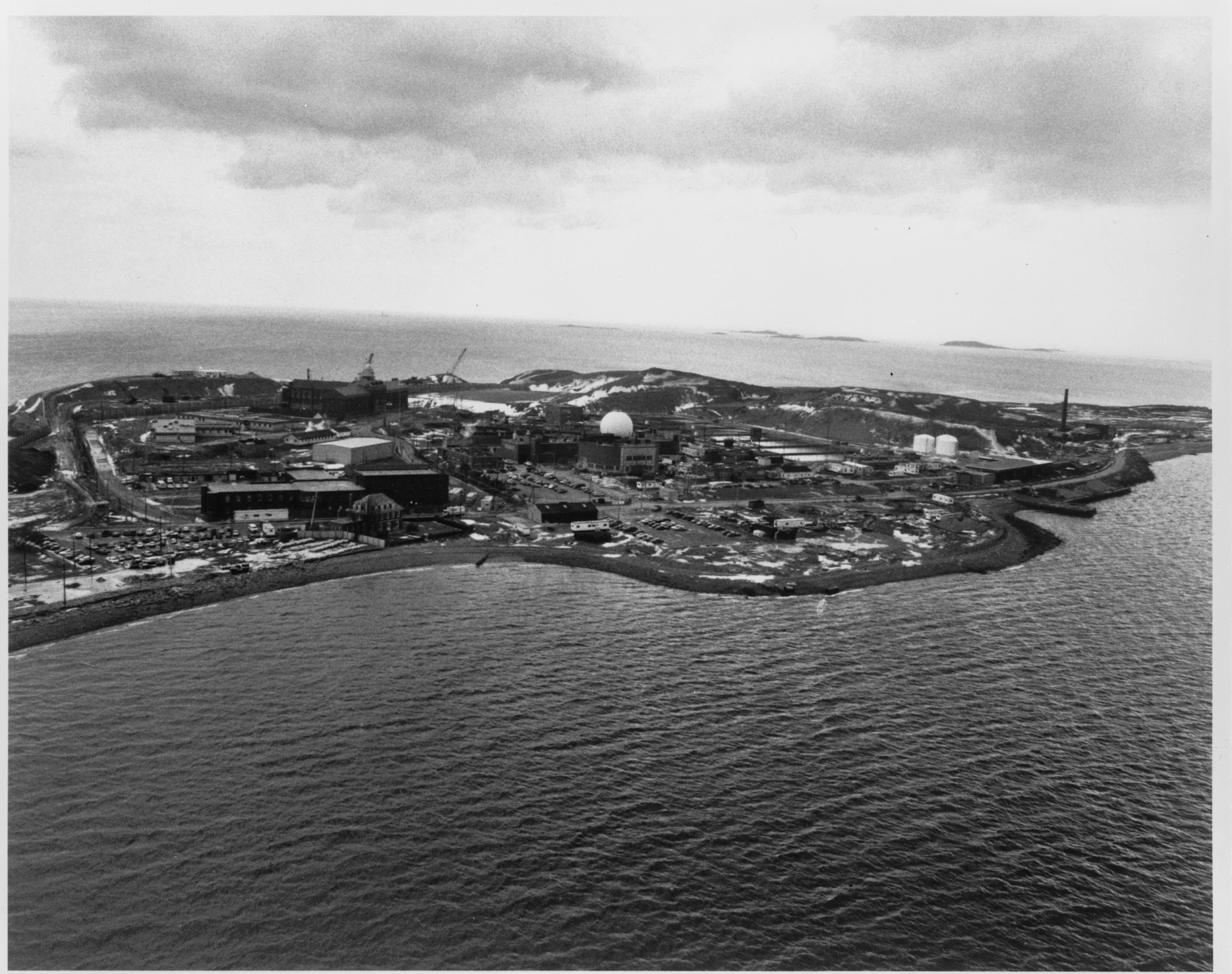
Deer Island, Boston Harbor, 20th century
