= The Bromfield Street Educational Foundation =

The Bromfield Street Educational Foundation (1973–1999) was the oldest organization in Boston, Massachusetts's gay community.

An advocate for gay rights, the foundation promoted awareness of the gay and lesbian community through the publication of the Gay Community News. Recognized as the most liberal newspaper, the Gay Community News discussed topics that were off limits to other publications such as feminism, antiracism, multiracialism, class issues, AIDS, and sexual liberation.

The foundation sponsored four other influential projects: OutWrite, Off the Page, Queer Progressive Organizing School, and the Prison Project.

== History ==
The Gay Community News published its first newsletter in the Charles Street Meeting House in Boston on June 17, 1973. Established by eight members of the LBGTQ community, the publication started off as a local, community-based newsletter with the intent to create a voice for the gay and lesbian community.

In less than one year, the Gay Community News upgraded from a two-page newsletter to a sixteen-page weekly newspaper. The office relocated to 22 Bromfield Street.

On March 8, 1975, the publication became a voice in the gay community in the Northeast. Three years later, in the summer of 1978, members of the Gay Community News voted to become a national newspaper. The publication touched upon topics such as feminism, antiracism, multiracialism, class issues, AIDS, and sexual liberation.

In 1979, the foundation fought to be recognized as a non-profit organization. It was believed that the newspaper would not receive the non-profit status without removing the word "gay" from the title. On July 1, 1982, The Gay Community News changed its name to the Bromfield Street Educational Foundation. The foundation was organized into three different categories: the board of directors, the paid staff, and the membership, which consisted of the board, staff, and volunteers. Six days later, the Bromfield Street office was destroyed in a fire. After much investigation, the fire was linked with arson. The foundation moved its office in 1982 to the fifth floor of 167 Tremont Street.

In the 1990s, the foundation sponsored projects such as OutWrite and the Queer Progressive Organizing School that were beneficial to the gay community. In the last decade of operation, it moved from Tremont Street to Berkeley Street to 25 West Street and finally to 29 Stanhope Street.

== Funded projects ==
The foundation funded projects that were progressive and beneficial to the gay and lesbian community. OutWrite was an annual conference between 1990 and 1999 for gay and lesbian writers. Between 1993 and 1995, Off-the-Page was a monthly readings series in Boston of gay and lesbian authors. Lastly, the Queer Progressive Organizing School was a forum in 1997 to organize progressive gay activists.

== The Prison Project ==
From 1975 to 1999, the Prison Project supported gays and lesbians in prison. The project began when a staff member of the Gay Community News, Mike Riegle, responded to prisoners' letters. In return, he granted the prisoners a free subscription to the newspaper. The foundation helped fund the sending of books, legal assistance, and publishing the letters written by the prisoners.

In 1977, both the foundation and the National Gay Task Force sued the federal prison for the right to gay publications in jail. For years, the foundation made it its goal to fight for the prisoners rights to receive copies of the Gay Community News as well as other gay and lesbian publications.
