= Deer Island Light =

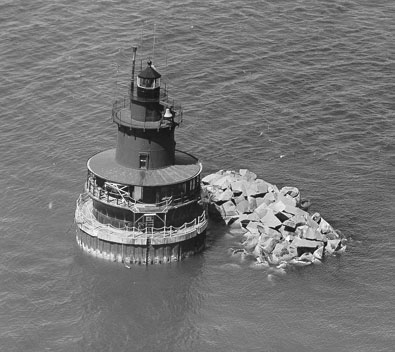
- The original 1890 light, replaced in 1982.
- Location: Boston Harbor
- Coordinates: 42°20′22.43″N 70°57′16.29″W

Tower
- Constructed: 1890
- Construction: Skeletal structure on piles
- Automated: 1960
- Height: 10 m (33 ft)
- Fog signal: Original: Bell current: HORN 1 every 10s

Light
- First lit: 1890, current structure 2016
- Focal height: 53 feet (16 m)
- Range: 9 nautical miles (17 km; 10 mi)
- Characteristic: Alt WR 10s

Deer Island Light is a lighthouse in Boston Harbor, Boston, Massachusetts. The actual light is 53 feet (16 m) above Mean High Water. Its alternating white and red light is visible for 9 nautical miles (17 km; 10 mi).

The light is at the end of a reef that extends about 1,500 feet (460 m) south from Deer Island. The location first had a stone beacon in 1832. The first light, a sparkplug type light, was lit in 1890. It cost about $50,000. It included a three-story dwelling, a veranda with boat davits, and a circular parapet. The water supply was a cistern in the base of the structure. A spiral staircase ran from the cellar to the top floor. It had a fixed white light, which was changed to flashing red every thirty seconds and then to the present alternating red and white flashes. The old light gradually deteriorated and was replaced in 1982 by a white fiberglass tower. The white tower raised complaints because it blended in with the background and was hard to see, so the Coast Guard moved it to Great Point Light, Nantucket, as a temporary replacement when that tower was destroyed by a storm in March 1984. A brown fiberglass tower was installed immediately thereafter. While the Spark plug light was interesting, it was much more expensive to maintain than the fiberglass structure. Imported from England, the pole light was the first of its kind in the United States.

Between October 2015 and May 2016, the brown tower was dismantled and the light was moved about 100 feet (30 m) south of its previous foundation structure. The new light uses LED technology and sits on a steel skeletal tower, atop four piles. Like other lights in Boston Harbor, the automatic fog signal has been replaced by a Mariner Radio Activated Sound Signal (MRASS) which can be activated by nearby mariners by tuning their marine VHF radio to channel 83A (157.17 5Mhz) and keying the transmitter five times consecutively.

== Gallery ==
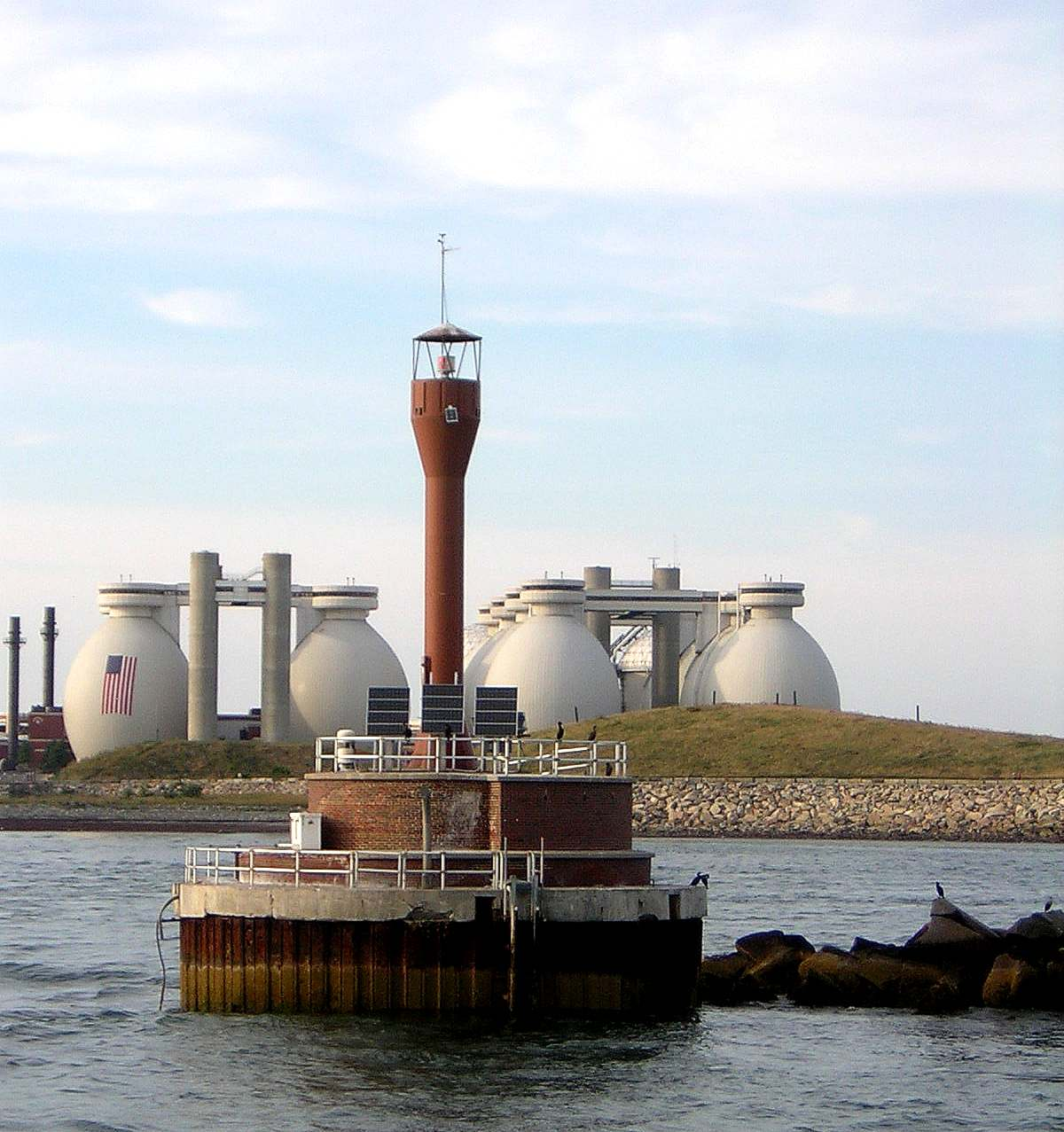
Deer Island Light in 2009, with Deer Island Waste Water Treatment Plant digesters in the background.

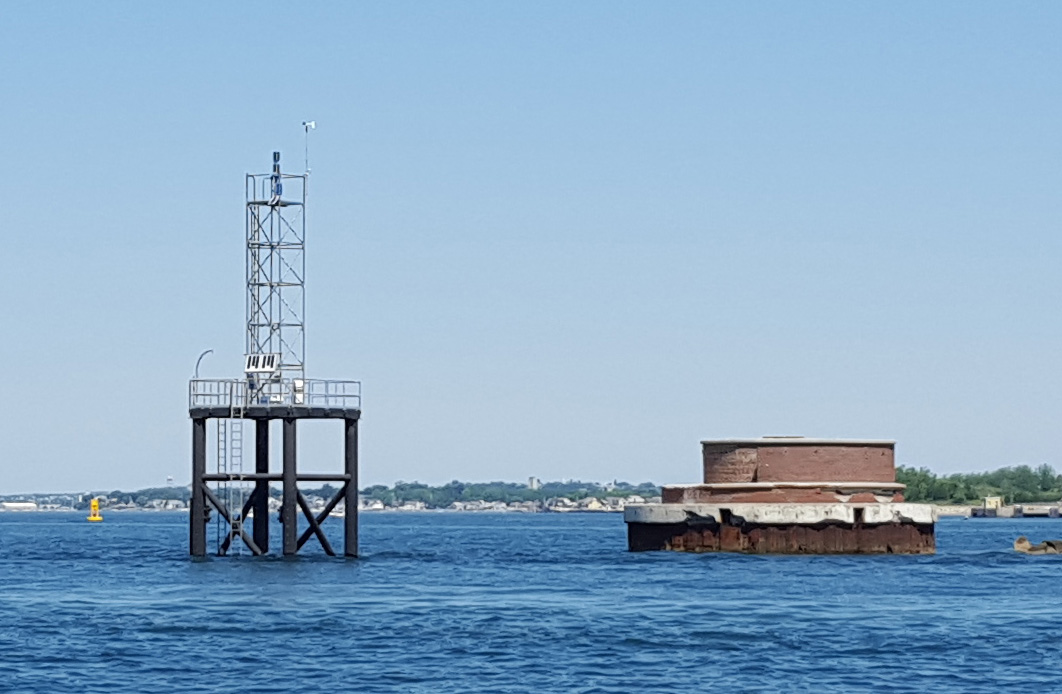
Deer Island Light in 2016, next to the old concrete foundation.
