= West Street (disambiguation) =

West Street is part of an expressway in Manhattan, New York City.

West Street may also refer to:

- West Street, London
  - West Street Chapel, a Methodist chapel in London
- West Street, Reading, a street in the centre of the English town of Reading
- West Street, Sheffield
- West Street Baptist Church, East Grinstead, England
- West Street District, a historic district in Boston, Massachusetts
- West Street Historic District, Bar Harbor, Maine
- West Street School, a historic school in Southington, Connecticut
- West Street subway station, a Glasgow Subway station serving the Tradeston area

== See also ==
- W Street
