= John Runnings =

John Runnings (22 August 1917 – 25 April 2004) was a peace protester also known as the "Wall Walker". Partly inspired by Mahatma Gandhi's work and nonviolent resistance in general, he is notable for his series of one-man protests against the Berlin Wall during the 1980s. These culminated in the construction of a largely symbolic, car-mounted battering ram. This particular action landed him with an 18-month prison sentence from the East German authorities. He was released after three months. The battering ram is exhibited in the Checkpoint Charlie Museum.

Runnings was born on a homestead in Manitoba, Canada. His mother died of influenza when he was about one year of age. His father, who now had several children to care for alone, decided, as Runnings put it, to "farm out" most of the children to relatives. Runnings' father's sister, who lived in southern Ontario, reluctantly agreed to become Runnings' guardian until he came of age. Runnings lived on her farm until about age 25, when he realised he had failed to register for the draft, so, during 1943, he was drafted. He became a stretcher-bearer, and served on the western front, mostly in the Allied invasion of Belgium, France and Germany, seeing many of his fellow soldiers die and often coming quite close to being hit by artillery bombardment.

After the war he decided to join his brother, who lived in Seattle. Around age 30, he met his future wife, Louise. They eventually joined the Quakers. They married when Runnings was in his early 30s and continued to live in Seattle. They eventually had four children: Bryan, Runnings' first child, was named after John – "Bryan" meaning "John" in Irish Gaelic. His other children are Morgan, Gwyneth and Anna.

About 1980 Runnings, along with other Quakers, got involved in the "Stop Trident" {nuclear submarines} movement in Bangor, Washington. After being arrested a few times, Runnings began to develop a perspective of his own as regards the problems associated with the Cold War.

He began to advocate a totally new method during this period, when Cold War threats had become more dangerous to life on earth than at any other time in human history. He suggested a movement to federate the United States and the Soviet Union. He also suggested that all should be considered "world citizens" rather than "citizens of specific nations." For this reason, he refused to apply for a passport prior to his decision to travel to Moscow in 1985.

He first attempt at "international civil disobedience" action began with a plan to make a friendly gesture to the Soviet Union by attempting to visit Odessa, in a large boat he repaired for that purpose. Unfortunately this plan failed because Runnings' partner decided to drop out of the plan and keep the boat entirely for his own after Runnings had done most of the repairs himself. Runnings considered taking civil action but finally decided it would take too much energy away from his overall mission.

A year after the Odessa plan, Runnings decided he would attempt to go to Berlin without a passport and there begin to take a sledgehammer to the Berlin Wall, hoping to inspire Germans to do the same. Several times in the early 1980s he attempted to fly out of New York and Boston airports with this intention. Each time he was arrested for persistent attempts to board commercial jets without a passport. On one occasion, he was sentenced to a period in Deer Island Prison near Boston, but was released early because of his persistence in going on hunger strikes and inspiring other prisoners to do the same.

After a number of similar imprisonments, Runnings decided in 1985 that he would apply for a passport. He planned to first visit Moscow during 1985 and the following year, he would use a passport to visit Berlin.

Once convinced to get a passport, Runnings went on to Moscow and leafletted all around Red Square for nearly a week. The Soviet authorities would have him taken to a police station about once every day or two and they would try to convince him to quit his leafletting. In his words, he would not say either "yes sir" or "no sir", but each time they released him, he would go back to leafletting, sometimes near Red Square, and sometimes he would take a subway to the suburbs.

Finally, after nearly two weeks of "playing this police station game", the Soviet authorities got "really tired" of Runnings' persistence. One day they told him they wanted to move him to another "more convenient" hotel. They came with an Intourist vehicle, picked him up (he co-operated because he believed them) and took him to the Moscow airport where they put him on board a jet with no passengers, only stewardesses – about 150 seats and he was the only passenger. The plane took off and the next thing he noticed was they were coming in for landing over an expanse of what seemed like endless forests and lakes. It was Helsinki, but as he could see, the Soviets wanted him out of Moscow.

A year later, Runnings went to Berlin to knock chunks out of the Wall and finally got arrested by East German guards and put in their jail for over three months. At the time, his back was injured, and Runnings was in extreme chronic pain. They finally released him through a West Berlin gate.
