= Great Hunger Memorial (Deer Island, Massachusetts) =

Celtic cross

Coordinates: 42.351924°N 70.964553°W

- Interactive map of Great Hunger Memorial
- Location: Deer Island, Massachusetts, U.S.
- Type: Celtic cross

The Great Hunger Memorial is a 16-foot tall Celtic cross located on Deer Island in Boston Harbor.

In the late 1840s, the Boston Corporation erected a hospital on the island. Irish immigrants, who arrived on coffin ships, were quarantined there. The memorial commemorates the 850 people who died on the island between 1847 and 1850, as they were trying to escape the Great Irish Famine. Their bodies were discovered during construction work done on the island in 1990.

The memorial is the result of decades long effort of a number of local Irish-American activists. Its construction was also championed by the Massachusetts Water Resources Authority and other local officials.

The memorial was the brainchild of Michael Kearney, John Flaherty, Peter O’Malley, Bernard Callaghan, and the late William and Rita O’Connell. It was cut and engraved at a quarry in Pennsylvania. It was erected with the help of Feeney Brothers of Boston and Local 25 of the Teamsters Union.

The monument was dedicated on May 25, 2019, in a ceremony attended by Boston Mayor Marty Walsh and Cardinal Sean O’Malley. The dedication included a speech from Boston City Archivist John J. McColgan.
