= Prescott Townsend =

American cultural leader and gay rights activist (1894–1973)

- Born: June 24, 1894; Roxbury, Massachusetts, US
- Died: May 23, 1973 (aged 78); Boston, Massachusetts, US
- Education: Harvard University
- Known for: Gay rights activism

Prescott Townsend (June 24, 1894 – May 23, 1973) was an American cultural leader and gay rights activist, from the 1930s through the early 1970s.

== Early life ==
He was born in Roxbury, Massachusetts, the fourth child (third son) of Kate Wendell Sherman and Edward Britton Townsend; his mother was both a descendant of Myles Standish through her grandmother Susannah Perkins Staples (the sister of Yale Law School founder Seth Perkins Staples) and other Mayflower passengers, and the great-granddaughter of the American founding father Roger Sherman and his wife Rebecca Minot Prescott, through their son Roger Sherman Jr.

He attended the Volkman School, graduated in 1918 from Harvard University, and attended Harvard Law School for one year. He spent the summer of 1914 in logging camps in Montana and Idaho, and traveled to North Africa and the Soviet Union. He returned to Boston's Beacon Hill neighborhood, where he began a relationship with theater producer Elliot Paul, with whom he founded the experimental Barn Theatre in 1922. Paul introduced Townsend to numerous avant-garde creatives, including openly gay writer André Gide. Townsend operated speakeasies, restaurants, and theaters, cultivating a bohemian neighborhood on Beacon Hill's Joy Street. He pioneered the popularity of A-frame houses, building several in Provincetown. He was later a founder of the Provincetown Playhouse, where the works of Eugene O'Neill were first performed.

== Activism and career ==
In the 1930s, Townsend repeatedly addressed the Massachusetts legislature as an acknowledged homosexual man advocating for the repeal of sodomy legislation, urging the lawmakers "to legalize love". He was indulged due to his Boston Brahmin status, but ignored.

While working at the Fall River shipyard during World War II, Townsend was arrested on January 29, 1943, for participating in an "unnatural and lascivious act". The Mid-Town Journal headline reported, "Beacon Hill 'Twilight' Man Member of Queer Love Cult Seduced Young Man". He did not deny it, and was sentenced to eighteen months in the Massachusetts House of Corrections on Deer Island. No one in his influential family applied any pressure to shorten his jail time. A month later he was officially stricken from both the New York and Boston Social Registers.

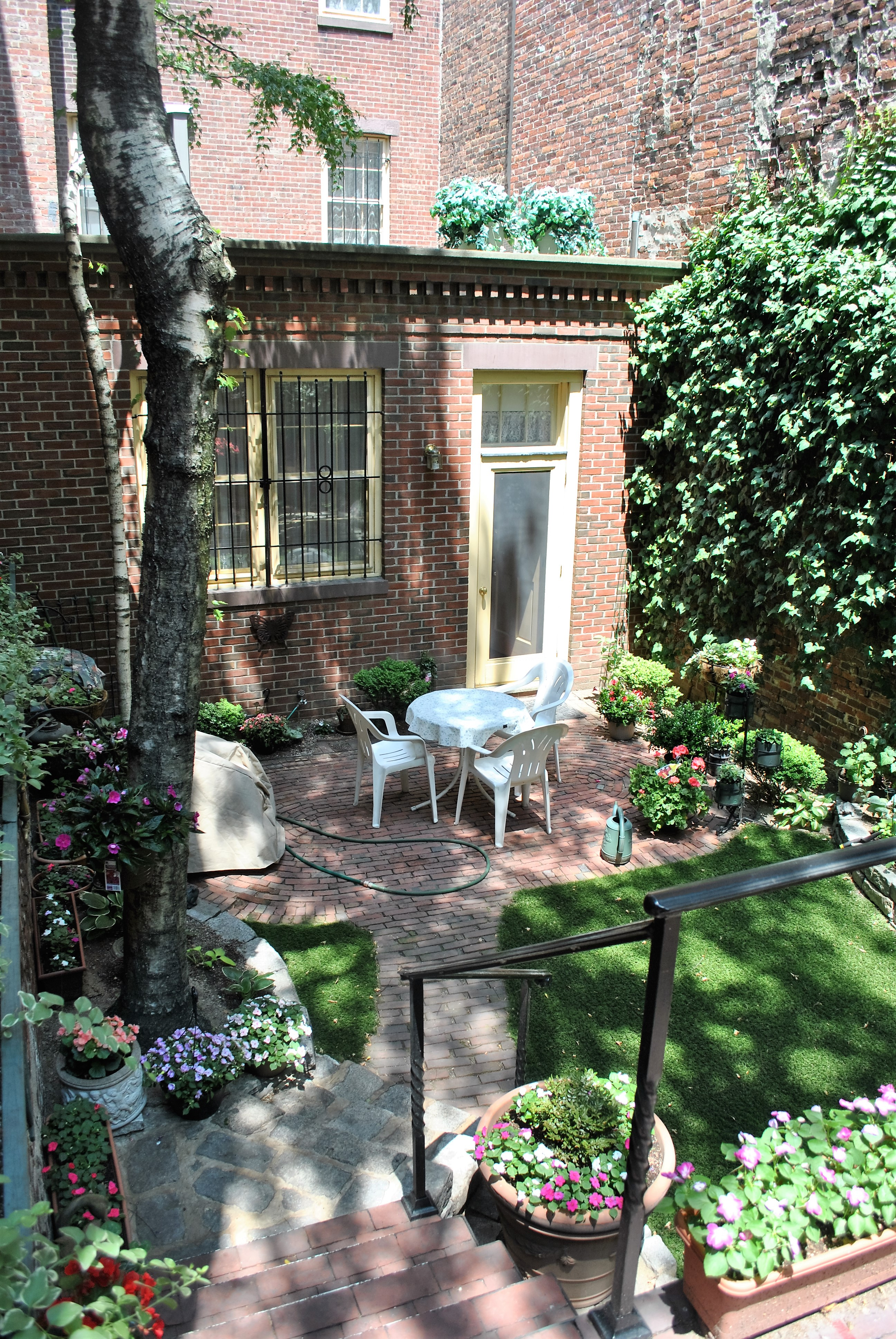
Townsend lived at 75 Phillips Street in Boston

Writing to his fellow Harvard graduates of the class of 1918 in their fiftieth annual report, Townsend addressed his arrest: "I helped win the Incredible Battle of Midway by working two years down at Fore River with a shipfitter's wedge, one time at ten below zero. Then I was thrown in jail for refusing to pay [$1500 in] graft for an act that is not against the law in England nor in Illinois. I came out the day the war was over."

In the 1950s, he held meetings at his home/bookstore, which he described as "the first social discussion of homosexuality in Boston". He founded a Boston chapter of the Mattachine Society, an early "homophile" organization; after the group grew and he was forced out, he founded the Boston Demophile Society.

In talks in Boston and Provincetown he promoted his "Snowflake Theory" of human personality and sexuality, stating that the human mind is like a snowflake in that no two are alike, and each has six opposing sides: I/You, He/She, Hit/Submit.

== Death ==
Toward the end of his life, his two remaining properties on the Hill were on its North Slope, traditionally the side where servants of patrician South Slope residents lived. He accommodated a motley collection of tenants, mostly young gay men, in an eight-unit building at 75 Phillips St; Prescott himself inhabited an old brick townhouse at the end of Lindall Place, a cul-de-sac that terminated just behind the Philips Street apartments. A subterranean corridor lined with cubicles connected the basements of the two buildings. The tunnel was said to have housed runaway slaves in transit on the Underground Railway prior to the Civil War.

Townsend had, for years, been suffering from failing health brought on by Parkinson's disease, and on May 23, 1973, his body was found in the Beacon Hill apartment of John Murray, who had been caring for him during the final years of his life. The police reported that "when we came in to take charge of the body, Mr. Townsend was found in a kneeling prayer position at his bedside." Of his entire family, only one sister, a nephew and a great-nephew attended his memorial service at the Arlington Street Church.
