= 20-30 Bromfield Street =

Historic buildings in Boston, Massachusetts

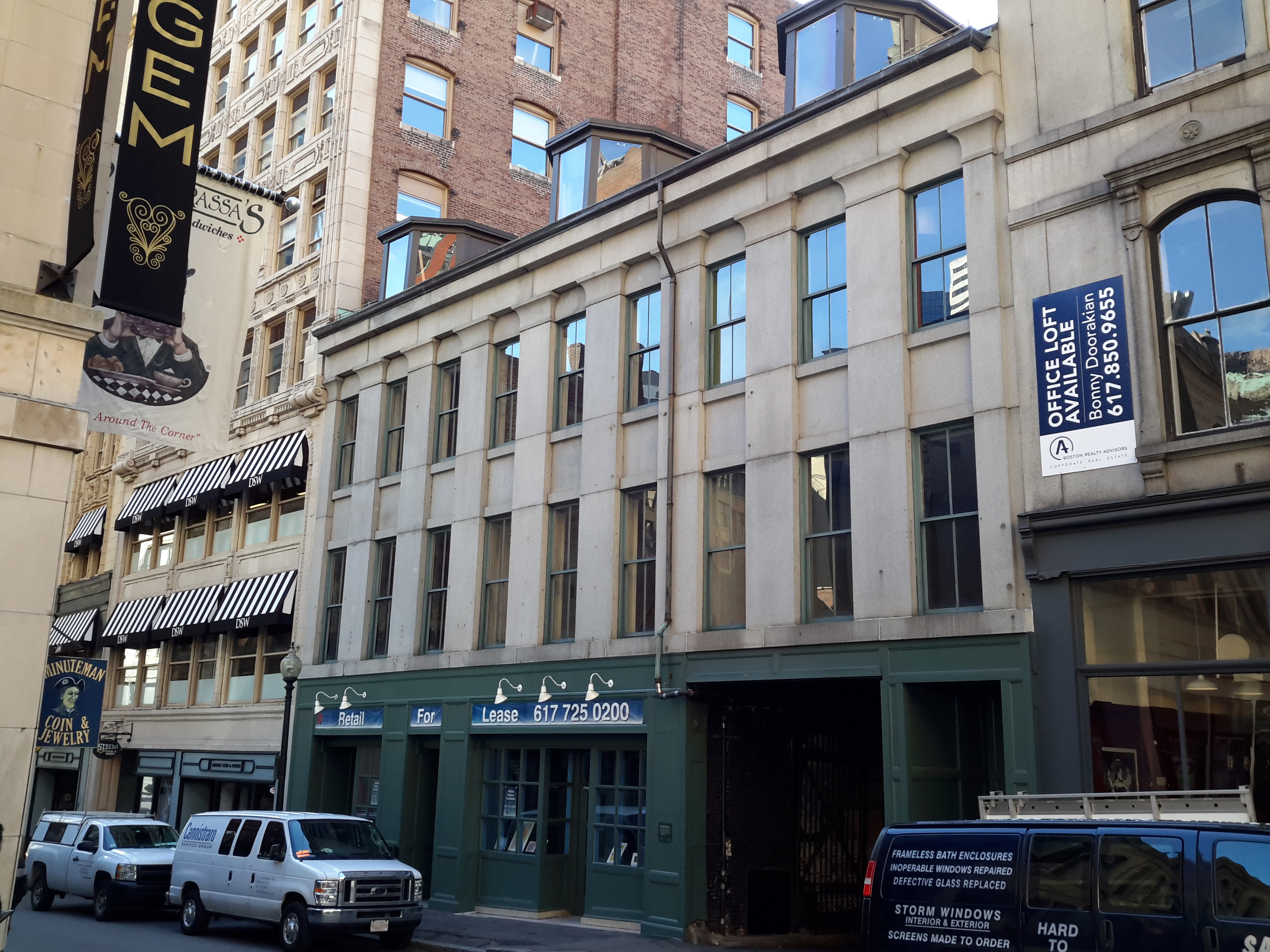
- 20-30 Bromfield Street as it appeared in 2014
- Interactive map of the 20-30 Bromfield Street area

General information
- Type: Commercial
- Location: 20-30 Bromfield Street, Boston, Massachusetts
- Coordinates: 42.356586°N 71.060154°W
- Completed: 1847-48

Technical details
- Floor count: 3.5

20-30 Bromfield Street is a historic commercial row in downtown Boston, Massachusetts. It is significant as being one of the few surviving 19th century commercial granite structures in the downtown area.

== Description and history ==
The row was built during the height of Boston's so-called "Granite Era," which saw the proliferation of mercantile buildings made of granite, though few of these structures now remain. It consists of three sections separated by brick bearing walls, each 3.5 stories in height and three window bays wide. The second and third floors are faced in granite, while the roof is pitched and sheathed in slate. A series of two-story granite piers or pilasters are topped with Egyptoid capitals, a rare example of Egyptian Revival architecture in Boston.

The row was built by John Ballard, a merchant whose family had long been active on Bromfield Street. Construction appears to have begun in 1847 and was complete by the following year. It originally consisted of five sections, but the two leftmost sections at 12-18 Bromfield were sold by Ballard's heirs and demolished in 1903 to make way for the Washington Building. The family had already relinquished ownership of 20-30 Bromfield by this time, being no longer in possession of the property by 1888.

20-24 Bromfield Street was nearly gutted by a seven alarm fire on July 7, 1982, which caused over $500,000 in damages and destroyed several artists' studios, as well as the offices of the Gay Community News. Plans to tear down the structure in the aftermath of the fire were approved by the city building department, but were halted after the Boston Landmarks Commission issued an order prohibiting its demolition. The commission subsequently designated the 20-30 Bromfield Street exterior as a Boston Landmark on March 8, 1983.
