= Team Trans =

- City: Boston, Massachusetts; Minneapolis–Saint Paul, Minnesota
- League: Independent
- Founded: 2019
- Colours: Blue, white, pink
- Website: bostonpridehockey.org/team-trans

Team Trans is an all-transgender and non-binary hockey team organization. Founded in Boston, Massachusetts in 2019, it is believed to be the first all-transgender ice hockey team in the United States. A Twin Cities regional chapter was later founded in 2021.

== History ==
=== Background and establishment (2016–2019) ===
In 2016, while playing in the National Women's Hockey League, Harrison Browne became what many publications thought to be the first openly transgender athlete in any professional U.S. team sport. In 2018, while playing in the Canadian Women's Hockey League, Jessica Platt would also come out as transgender.

Following an early 2019 Boston Pride Hockey (Note: Boston Pride Hockey is a local hockey organization unrelated to the professional women's hockey team.) game with the New York City Gay Hockey Association, plans for the team's founding took shape at a bar in the Chelsea neighborhood of Manhattan. The Pride players went out for drinks following the game and the team's president, Greg Sargent, noticed Aidan Cleary, a New York team member, sitting alone in a corner. Cleary conveyed to Sargent about a Facebook group that he belonged to which had "all the trans hockey players," trying to put together their own team. Cleary had been in discussion with Hutch Hutchinson, a defender on Team Trans, about how they wanted to create a space for transgender athletes. Cleary then contacted Boston Pride Hockey Vice President Mark Tikonoff about recruiting an all-trans team. Soon, players began connecting through social media, and the team was able to recruit Browne and Platt onto the team. Most of the players resided in the U.S. northeast, although there were some from the Midwest, Canada, as well as California. Many of the Team Trans players have cited "overly masculine attitudes" of male teams, as well as loneliness on teams, even LGBTQ ones, as reasons for joining the team and finding their playing experience an enjoyable one.

=== First games and COVID-19 (2019–2020) ===
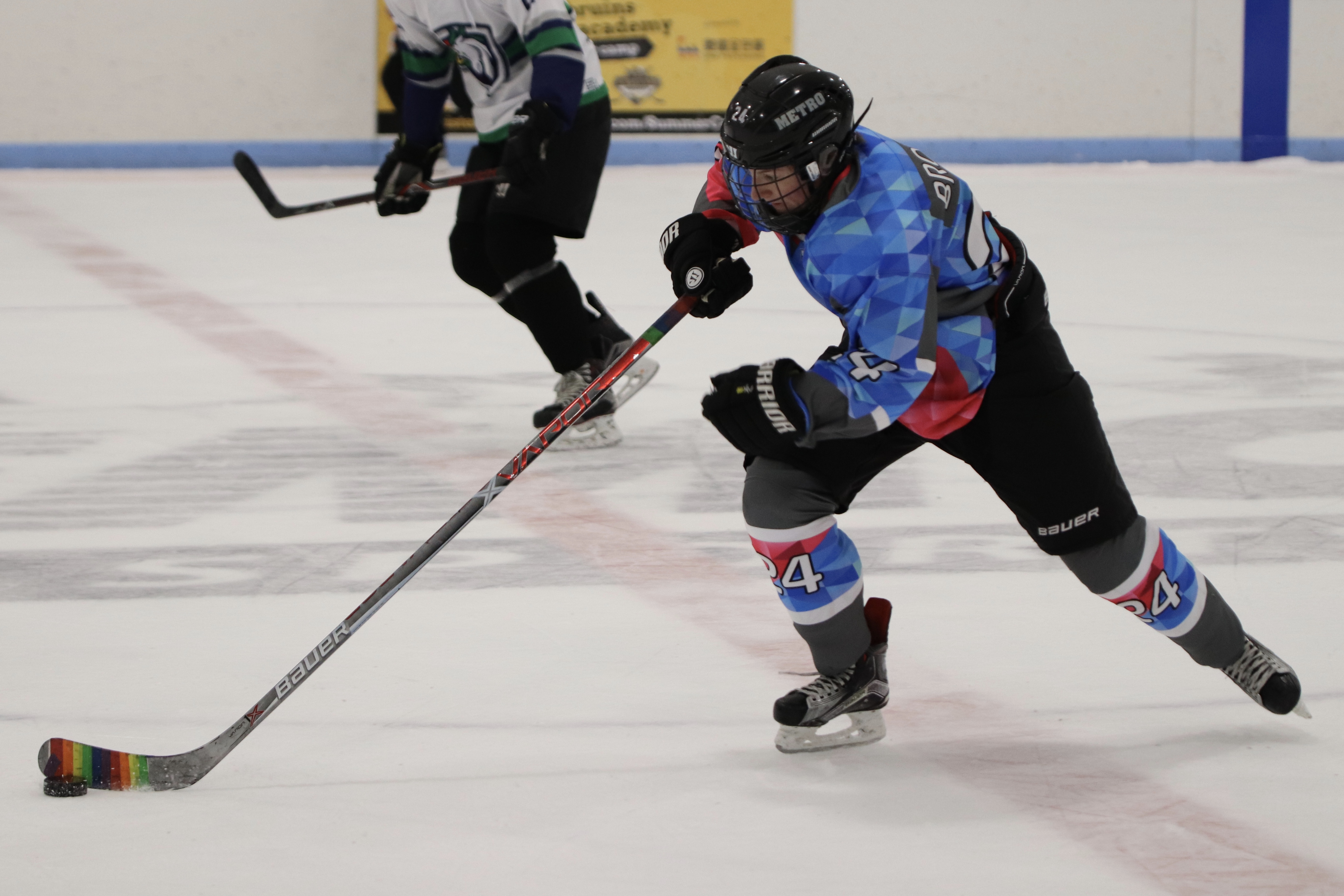
Harrison Browne skates in the 2019 Friendship Series in Boston, MA

The team met for the first time on November 8, 2019, in Cambridge, Massachusetts, with 13 of the team's initial members traveling from outside of the area to meet. The team is considered to be the first sports team in the United States fully made up of transgender or gender nonconforming players; an all-transgender soccer team in Brazil preceded Team Trans' existence. The team received jerseys and matching socks that were in the colors of the transgender flag (pink, white, and blue); the Boston Pride Hockey organization paid for the team's uniforms. They held one practice, and team played their first match against the BPH Select team the following day. Held in the Simoni Ice Arena in Cambridge, the match was the first in a 2-game series—dubbed the "Friendship Series"—between the two teams. Team Trans lost both the first and second game, 4–3 and 8–3, respectively. The match-up included both professional and amateur players.

The New York Times published a piece on the team and their first games, detailing "the games were held in a public rink tucked into a strip mall. The crowd was modest, several dozen people in all. Family, friends, fans of Browne and Platt and a scattering of local residents." The team's players positively received their first games, taking to social media to commemorate them.

The team holds a tentative plan to enter LGBTQ hockey tournaments around North America and encourages trans players anywhere to join, in essence functioning as a barnstorming team with a rotating roster. The team was also scheduled to play in a second Friendship Series with the Madison Gay Hockey Association in April 2020, though these plans were postponed in response to the coronavirus pandemic.

=== Madison, Wisconsin (2021) ===
After awaiting the chance to enter LGBTQ hockey tournaments since the start of the pandemic, the team reunited on the ice in Middleton, WI over the weekend of November 20–21, 2021. Players on the team traveled from Canada, Japan, and elsewhere in the United States; their travel fees were paid for by donations, including one from the National Hockey League (NHL).

The weekend included three Team Trans teams and six total games (three each day) against the Madison Gay Hockey Association (MGHA). Team Trans was undefeated, recording the first win, shutout, and hat trick in team history.

=== Twin Cities chapter ===
In late 2021, some of the team's members from Minnesota started a regional chapter based in the Twin Cities. Team Trans Twin Cities has around 100 players, with their ages ranging from 18 through their 50s. The players are divided by skill level, in order to play scrimmages or against other teams from college or adult recreational leagues. The team undergoes occasional travel for games.

They played exhibition games at Parade Ice Garden in Minneapolis during the Twin Cities Pride Festival in June 2023.

== Players and personnel ==
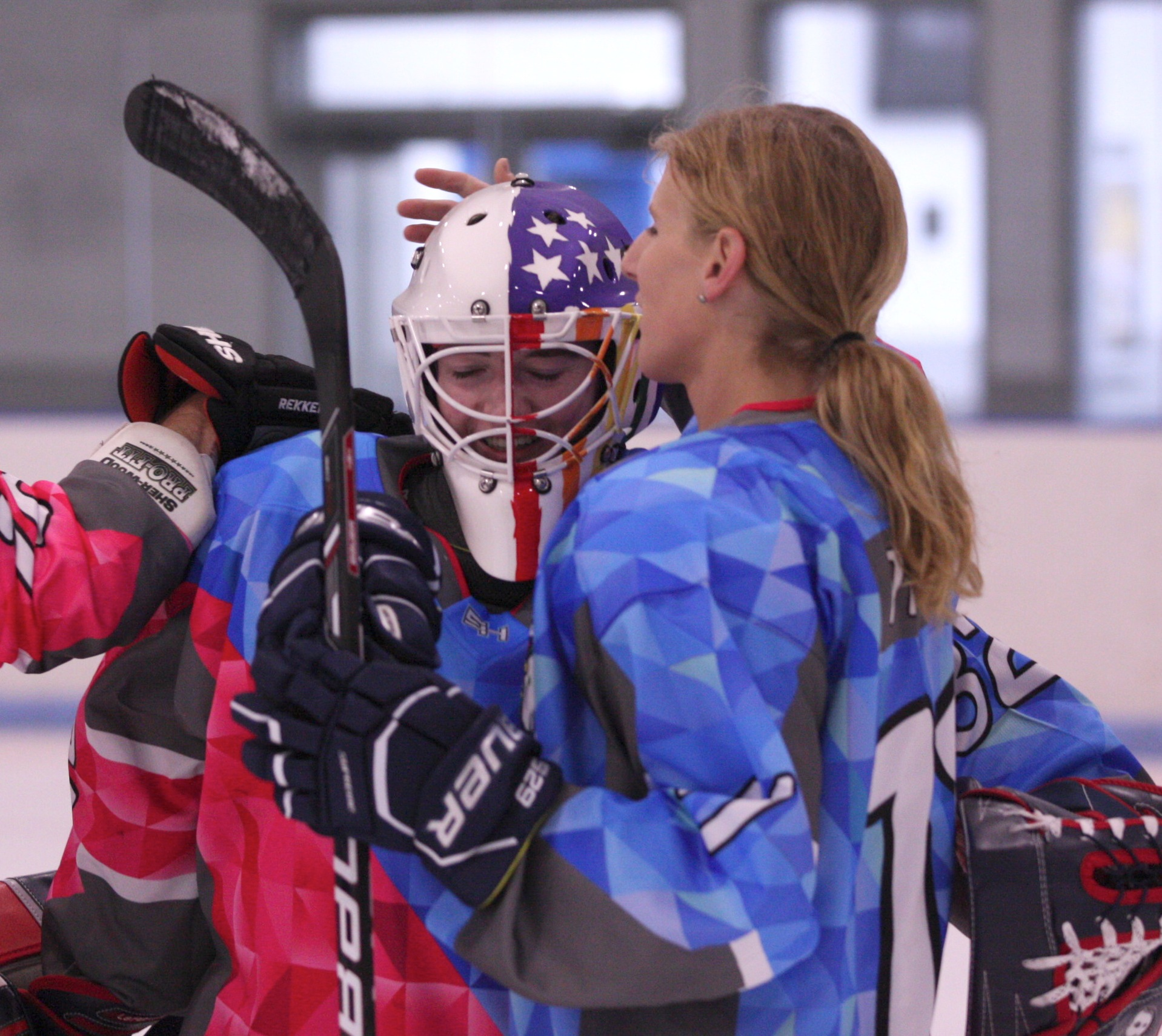
LeFebvre and Platt hug after a loss in the Boston Friendship Series.

As aforementioned, Browne, Cleary, Hutchison, and Platt are members on the team. Browne and Platt served as honorary captains on the team. Shane Diamond, Kat Ferguson, William Frahm-Gilles, Mason LeFebvre (formerly Alex in some media from the 2019 Boston event), Heather Lynn, Brynn Toohey, Jack Henderson, and k8 Walton have also been mentioned in media articles as inaugural members of the team.

In Madison, the team was coached in each game by cisgender woman Kate Helmich and her fiancé, cisgender man Chris Thomas, at the request of all 51 players.
