= Deer Island (Massachusetts) =

Peninsula in Boston, Massachusetts

Coordinates: 42°21′06″N 70°57′31″W

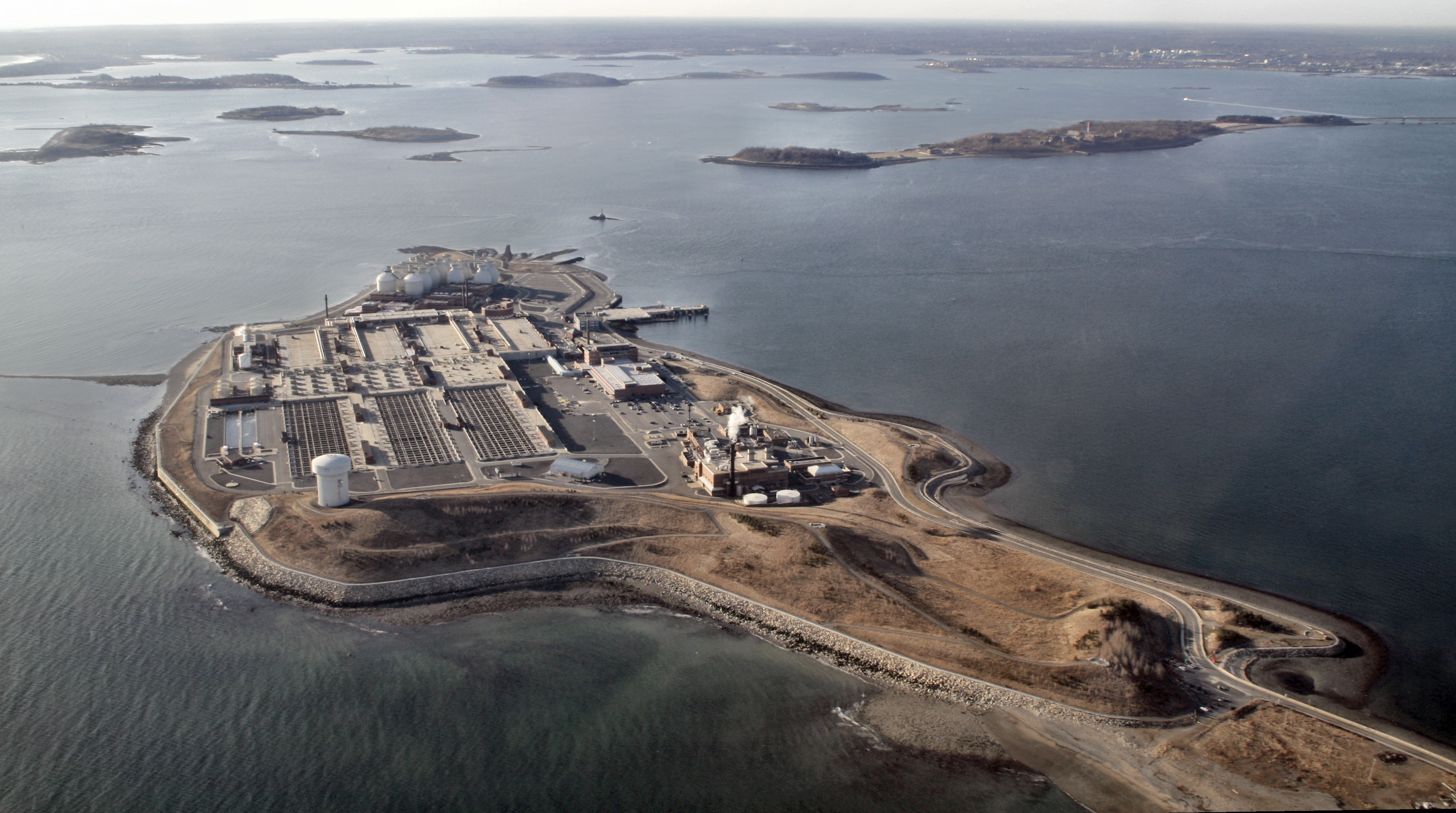
Deer Island

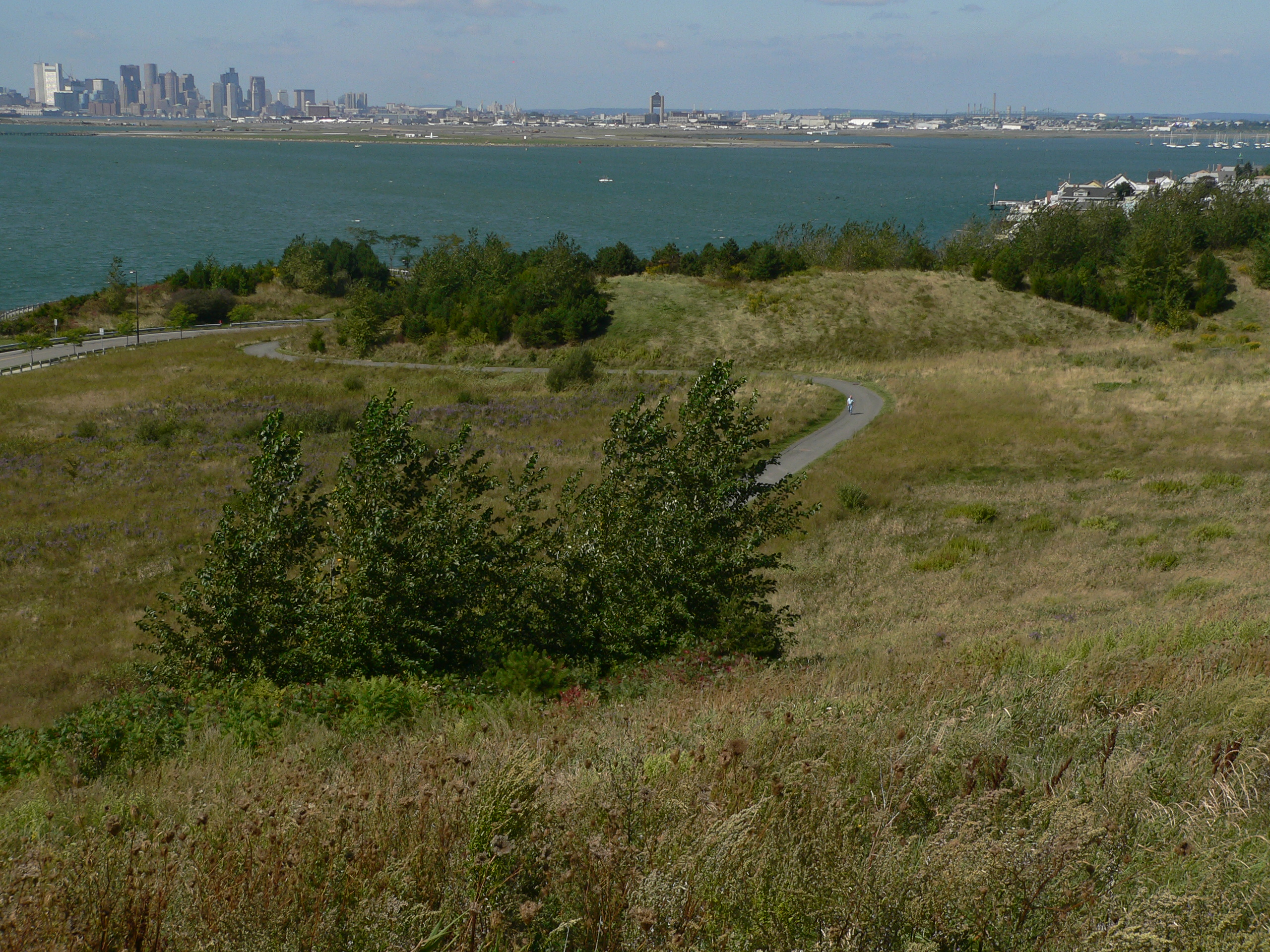
Boston from Deer Island

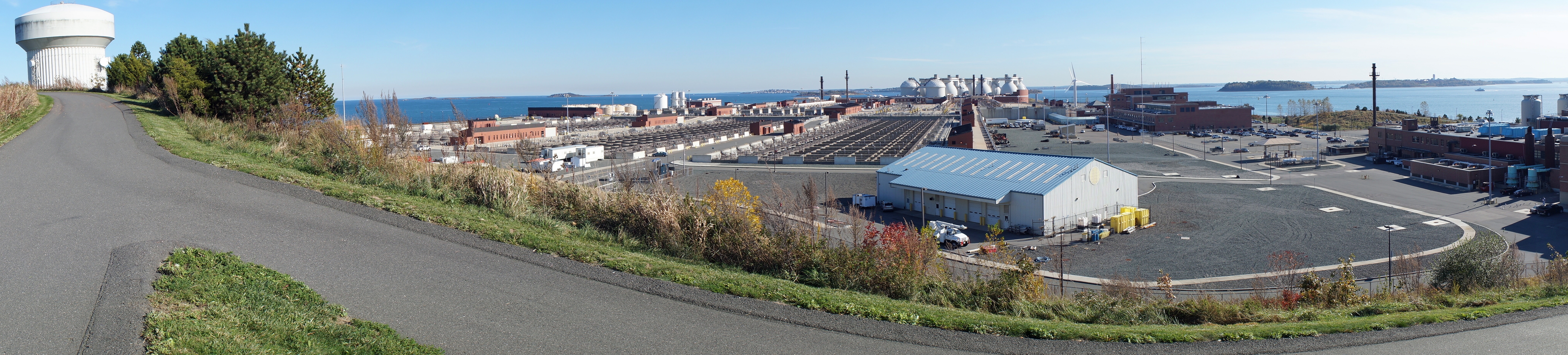
Wastewater treatment plant, water tower, Deer Island

Deer Island is a peninsula in Boston, Massachusetts, United States. Since 1996, it has been part of the Boston Harbor Islands National and State Park. Although still an island by name, Deer Island has been connected to the mainland since the former Shirley Gut channel, which once separated the island from the town of Winthrop, Massachusetts, was filled in by the 1938 New England hurricane. Today, Deer Island is the location of the Deer Island Waste Water Treatment Plant, whose 150-foot-tall (46 m) egg-like sludge digesters are major harbor landmarks.

During King Philip's War, the island was used as an internment camp for hundreds of indigenous people, and many died. Today, Native Americans commemorate the loss by returning to Deer Island on an annual basis.

== Name and description ==
The island was named after deer, which would swim to the island to escape wolves.

The island's permanent size is 185 acres (0.75 km^{2}), plus an intertidal zone of a further 80 acres (320,000 m^{2}). Two-thirds of the island's area is taken up with a wastewater plant, which treats sewage from 43 nearby cities and towns, and is the second-largest such plant in the United States. The remainder of the island is park land surrounding the treatment plant. The area offers walking, jogging, sightseeing, picnicking, and fishing activities.

== History ==
=== 1600s ===
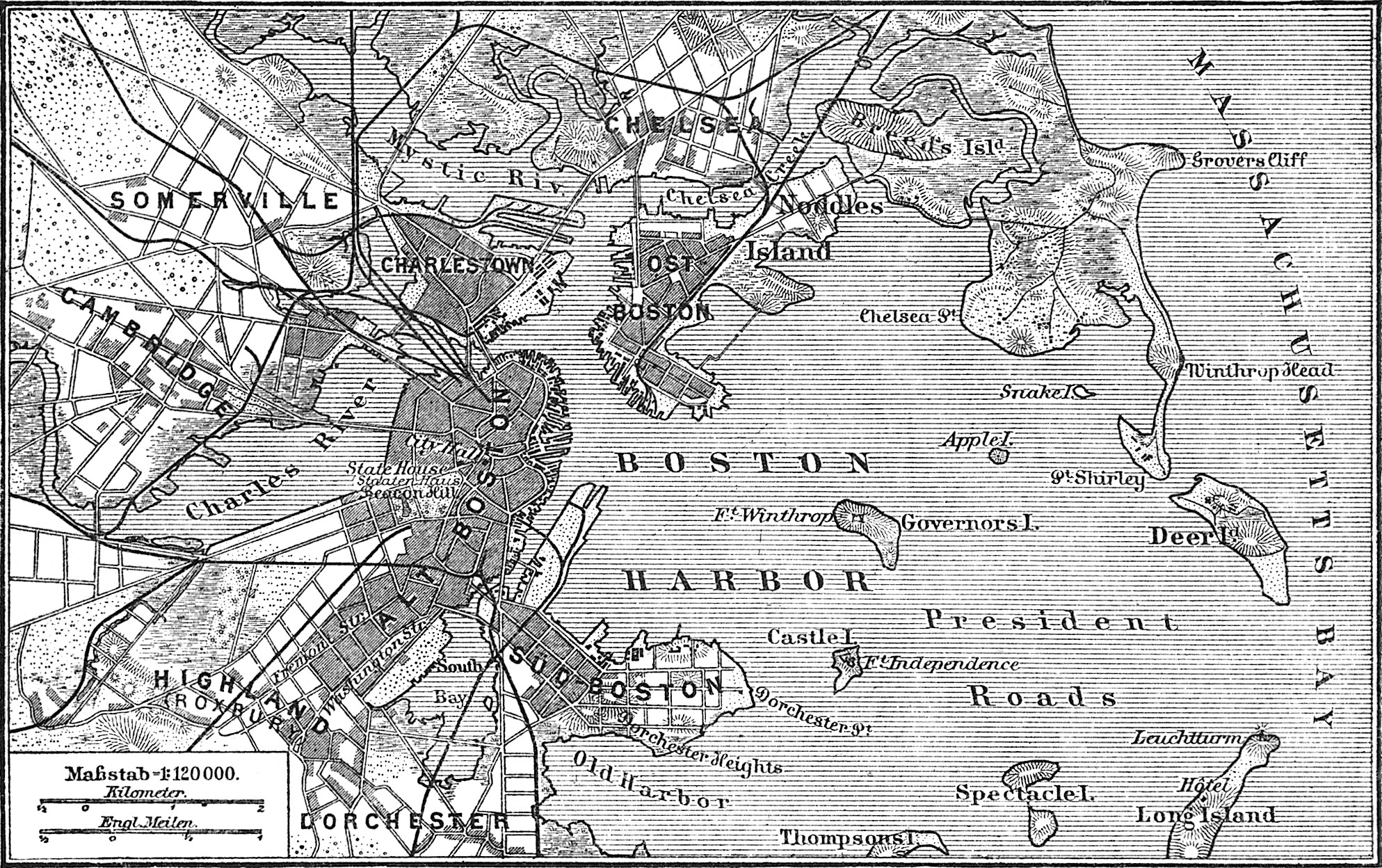
Deer Island, far right center, from Meyers Konversations-Lexikon 1890 map of Boston Harbor

The island was once leased to Sir Thomas Temple (1614–1674), a British proprietor and governor of Nova Scotia although this descent was debunked by E. A. Freeman in the 19th century. Sir Thomas Temple was also the uncle of John Nelson (1654–1734), a New England trader and statesman, who owned neighboring Long Island in Boston Harbor, which at one time was also known as "Nelson's Island".

During King Philip's War (also known as Metacomet's War) colonists forcefully removed "Praying Indians" who had converted to Christianity from Concord, Marlborough, Grafton, Massachusetts, and Natick and placed them on various harbor islands. Between 500 and 1,100 American Indians were held on Deer Island in the winter of 1675-1676. Women and children made up the majority of those interned on the island, as colonists pressured many men from these praying communities to join an English proxy militia and attack other local indigenous tribes. With little food and inadequate shelter, about half of them died. Some, such as the medicine man, Tantamous, escaped Deer Island only to be recaptured later.

=== 19th-20th century ===
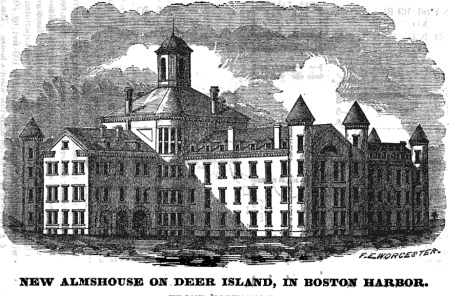
Almshouse, Deer Island, 1851

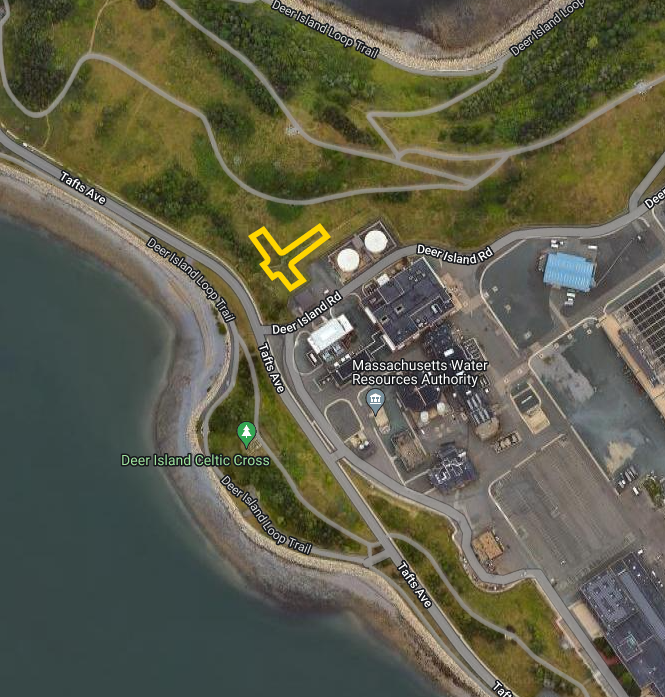
The likely site of the old Almshouse on Deer Island (42.353294, -70.964300)

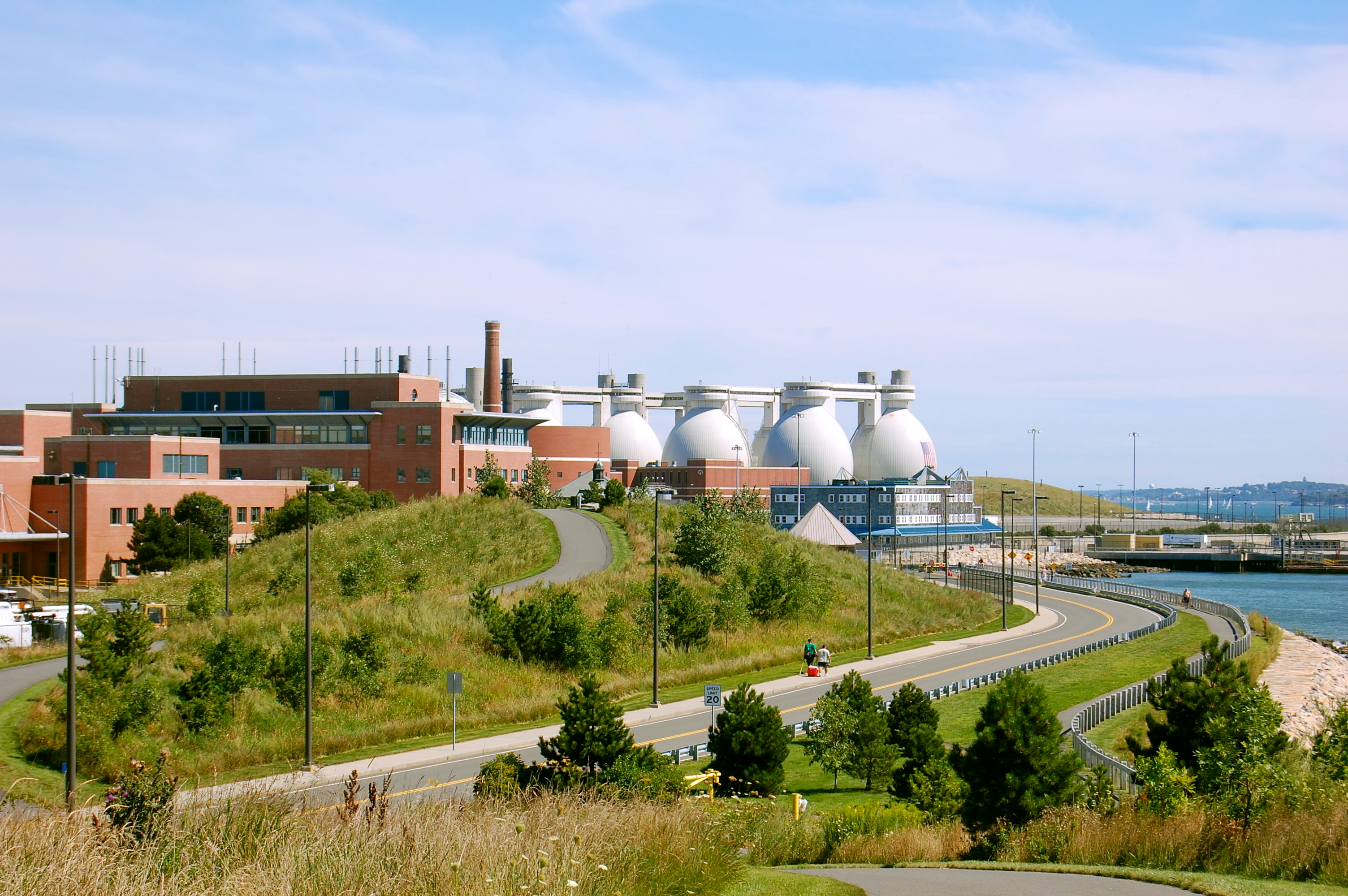
Deer Island wastewater plant and surrounding park area

In the middle of the 19th century, the island was the landing point for thousands of refugees from the Great Famine of Ireland, many sick and poverty-stricken. In 1847, a hospital was established to treat incoming immigrants, and during the following two years, about 4,800 men, women, and children were admitted. Many recovered and went on to new lives, but more than 800 died. In 1850, an almshouse was built to house paupers. Opened in 1853, it was administered by the City of Boston. Today, a Celtic Cross is erected not far from the old site of the Almshouse, honoring the 850 who died during the Famine Era.

In 1896, the almshouse facility became one of the short-term prisons for Suffolk County. The Deer Island House of Correction existed until 1991, when the prisoners were permanently transferred to the South Bay House of Correction. The Deer Island prison is mentioned in Sylvia Plath's poem "Point Shirley" and her novel The Bell Jar.

In his book A Short History of Nearly Everything, Bill Bryson mentions an experiment done at the naval prison on Deer Island. Following the August 1918 flu pandemic, in an attempt to develop a vaccine, 62 volunteers were selected from 300 prisoners. These men were promised pardons if they survived a set of tests. None of the volunteers fell sick, but the ward doctor contracted the disease and died. The prisoners possibly became immunized due to exposure to the virus during the weeks preceding the trial, experiencing few symptoms or none at all. The doctor in charge of the experiment, Joseph Goldberger, published a report on the experiment in 1921. His report mentions the volunteers coming from a naval facility on Deer Island, but nothing regarding prisoners or pardoning of sentences.

At the time, two separate entities existed on Deer Island for naval facilities and correctional facilities: Fort Dawes and the House of Correction. Goldberger's final report mentions two experiments on Deer Island at different times (November to December 1918 and February to March 1919), as well as a third in San Francisco (November to December 1918).

A lighthouse was erected just offshore from the island in 1890; it was replaced by a modern tower in 1984.

The first sewage-treatment plant was constructed on Deer Island in the late 19th century and expanded in the 1960s. The current Deer Island Waste Water Treatment Plant dates from the 1990s. Deer Island has been connected to the mainland since the New England Hurricane of 1938.

== Modern recreational uses ==
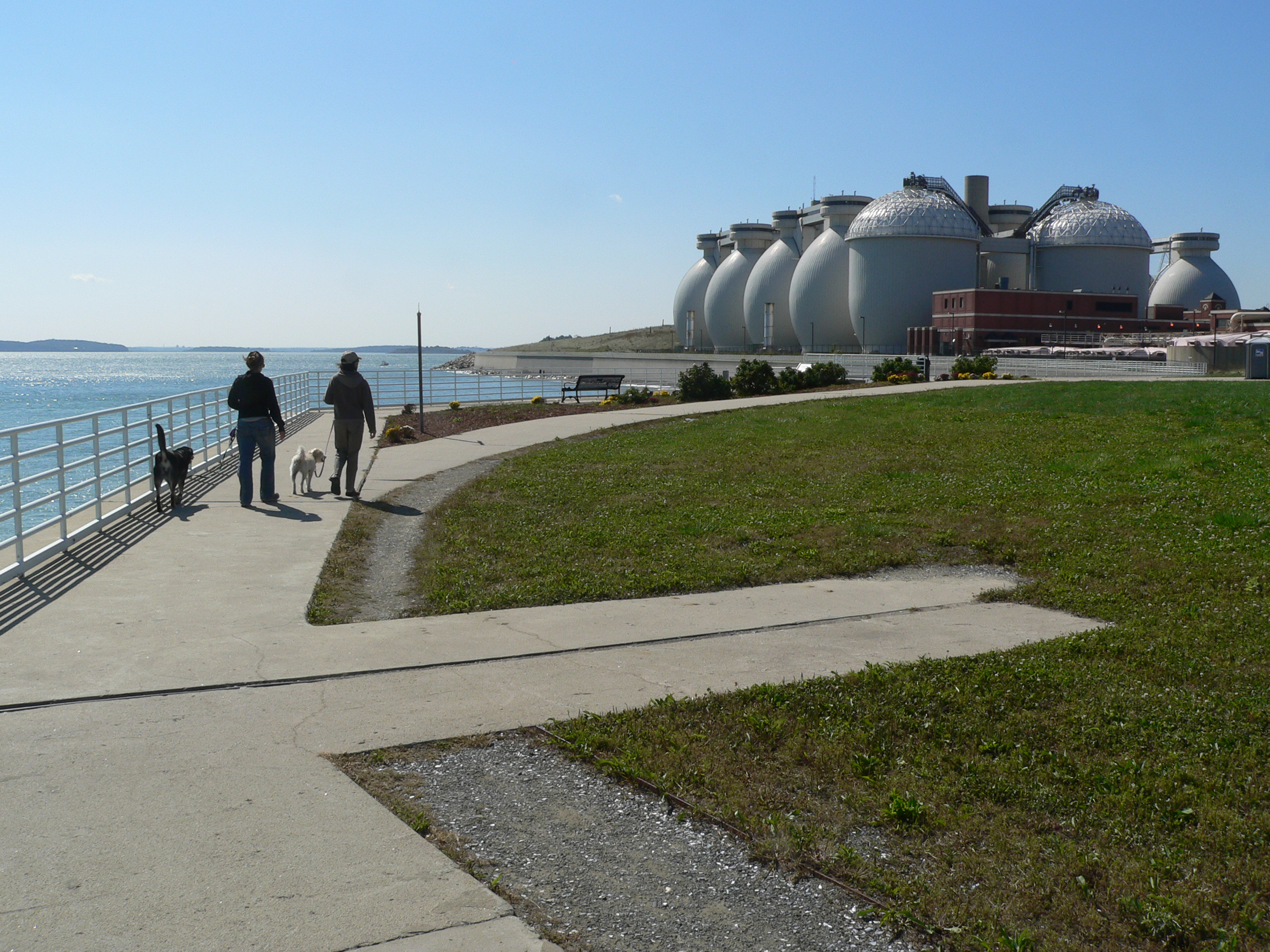
Walkers next to sewage digester tanks

Deer Island is a popular recreation destination. A hiking/biking trail encircles the island, which is reachable by car, bus, or sea. A public boat dock is at the southwest corner of the island. Trails also climb escarpments on the island, including the highest one near the water tower. This vantage point offers views of the city, ocean, and Logan International Airport, and is a popular spot for planespotting. The southern tip of the island offers some of the best views from land of the Boston Harbor Islands.

== Incidents ==
In June 2015, the body of an unknown toddler girl, later identified as Bella Bond, was found on the island. Due to the state of decomposition, investigators were not immediately able to determine the age, sex, or ethnicity of the body.

== See also ==
- Angel Island, California
- Ellis Island
- Great Hunger Memorial, a monument dedicated to the Irish Great Famine installed on Deer Island in 2019

== Bibliography ==
- Some Events of Boston and Its Neighbors, printed for the State Street Trust Company, Boston, Massachusetts, 1917.
- "The Islands of Boston Harbor", in Some Events of Boston and Its Neighbors, Chapter 4, printed for the State Street Trust Company, Boston, Massachusetts, 1917.
- Winsor, Justin, Jewett, C.F., The Memorial History of Boston Including Suffolk County, Massachusetts. 1630-1880, 1880. https://web.archive.org/web/20061113122453/http://www.helloboston.com/80_LocalBook.Cfm]
- United States, National Park Service, and Boston Support Office. Boston Harbor Islands: A National Park Area: General Management Plan. Boston, Mass: National Park Service, Northeast Region, Boston Support Office, 2002.
