= Sexual Minorities Archives =

U.S. archive of LGBT material

Coordinates: 42.215785°N 72.626394°W

- Sexual Minorities Archives in 2026
- Location: Holyoke, Massachusetts, U.S.
- Type: Archives

The Sexual Minorities Archives is one of the oldest LGBTQI archives in the United States, and holds the Leslie Feinberg Library, a collection of the late writer's personal research materials. As of 2017, the physical archive is located in a large converted Victorian home in Holyoke, Massachusetts. It was previously located in the home of curator and transgender activist Ben Power Alwin in Northampton, Massachusetts, from 1979 to 2017. It was founded in Chicago in 1974 by a lesbian-feminist organization known as the New Alexandria Lesbian Library. The Sexual Minorities Educational Foundation, Inc. (SMEF, Inc.) was formed in 2011 to further the work of the SMA. The organization's motto, Queer Archiving = Queer Activism, reflects their belief that archiving is an act of rebellion against the dominant culture's erasure of queer history, literature and art. It continues to advocate for archival justice, education and equality by documenting the untold and often misrepresented lives of sexual and gender minorities.

== History ==
=== Organization founding and name ===
On July 12, 1974, The New Alexandria Library for Women (NALW) was founded within the Lesbian Feminist Center (LFC) in Chicago, Illinois. In September 1974, the organization was renamed to the New Alexandria Lesbian Library for Women (NALLW).

When the LFC closed its doors in 1977, transgender activist and library volunteer Ben Power Alwin took the collection into his Rogers Park apartment in Chicago and became the curator. In 1979, the library's name was streamlined to the New Alexandria Lesbian Library (NALL).

On January 1, 1992, Ben renamed the collection to the Sexual Minorities Archives (SMA), "to reflect his collection, preservation, protection, and accessibility goals for materials from and about transsexuals, transgender persons, lesbians, gays, bisexuals, intersex persons, queers, gender-queers, BDSM/leather folk, fetishists, asexuals, polyamorists, celibates, and any other emerging sexual minority groups of all races and ethnicities." The New Alexandria Lesbian Library remains a core collection within the SMA.

=== Location over the years ===
In 1979, Ben Power Alwin and then partner Diane Sievers moved the NALLW to the former residence of lesbian author Jill Johnston in Huntington, Massachusetts. In 1980, Ben & Diane moved NALL to a large, rented house in Worthington, Massachusetts. After 10 months, the couple separated and the collection moved again. In 1981 the collection moved to Leeds, Massachusetts and quickly outgrew the small space. In 1983, Ben Power Alwin moved the collection to a rented home in Northampton, Massachusetts, where it resided until 2017.

In June 2014, the owner of the house where the SMA had been since 1983 put the property up for sale. Ben Power Alwin secured a mortgage and took steps to purchase the collection's long-time home; however, in October 2014, the owner refused to sell the property to Ben.

On March 26, 2015, Ben Power Alwin successfully purchased a larger house in Holyoke Massachusetts, the current location of the SMA and SMEF. Moving of the collections from Northampton to Holyoke began in Fall 2015. On June 3, 2017, SMA had their official opening in Holyoke and inaugurated the Leslie Feinberg Library in the SMA.

== Collection ==
The archive includes three types of materials: literature, history, and art. The Literature collection "spans more than a century and includes LGBTQI books (fiction and non-fiction), pulp paperbacks, reference books, over 1,000 periodical titles with 17,000 individual issues, and more." The History collection "ranges from the mid-19th century and...includes subject files, multimedia, personal papers, organizational collections, speeches, correspondence, ephemera, political and sociocultural buttons, and more." The Art collection "includes original LGBTQI paintings and drawings, posters, banners, photography, sculpture, textiles, and music."

In 1978, the NALLW acquired one of its rarest books: a limited-run, first edition copy of The World Is Round by Gertrude Stein, autographed by Stein and artist Clement Hurd in 1939. The book was purchased for $90 at an auction in Chicago, Illinois by Ben Power Alwin and Sara Hoagland, who donated it to the NALLW.

As of 2017, collection materials can be freely searched and viewed online through the Digital Transgender Archive, the largest digital archive of transgender materials in the world.

== Community Outreach ==
When located in Northampton, the SMA began offering LGBTQ history walking tours to the public in 2013, co-guided by SMA volunteer Elizabeth Kent, who conducted the research, and Ben Power Alwin. On October 21, 2017, SMA celebrated the official opening of 'Out Books On Wheels', the free lending library of over 4,000 LGBTQ titles located within the archive.

SMA has historically provided space for local community support groups, such as the East Coast FTM Group and House of Colors.
