= Deer Island Waste Water Treatment Plant =

Waste water treatment plant in Boston, Massachusetts

Coordinates: 42°21′2.53″N 70°57′26.29″W

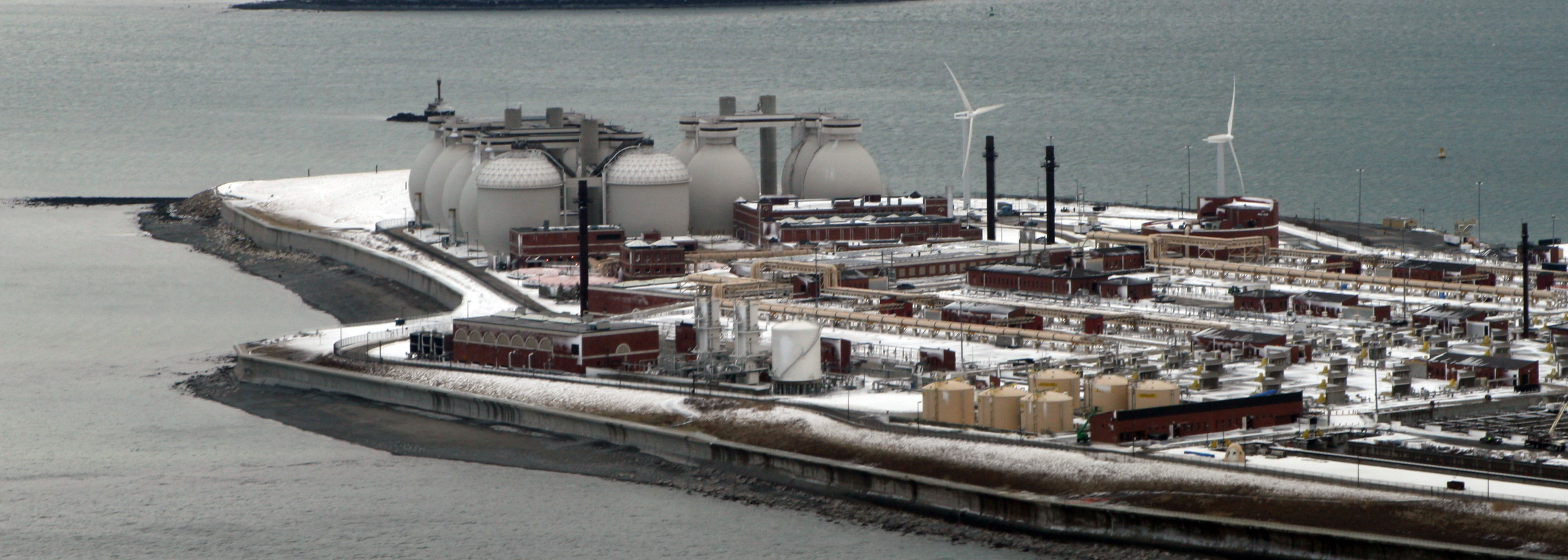
Aerial view, Deer Island Wastewater Treatment Plant, 2010. Photo by Doc Searls.

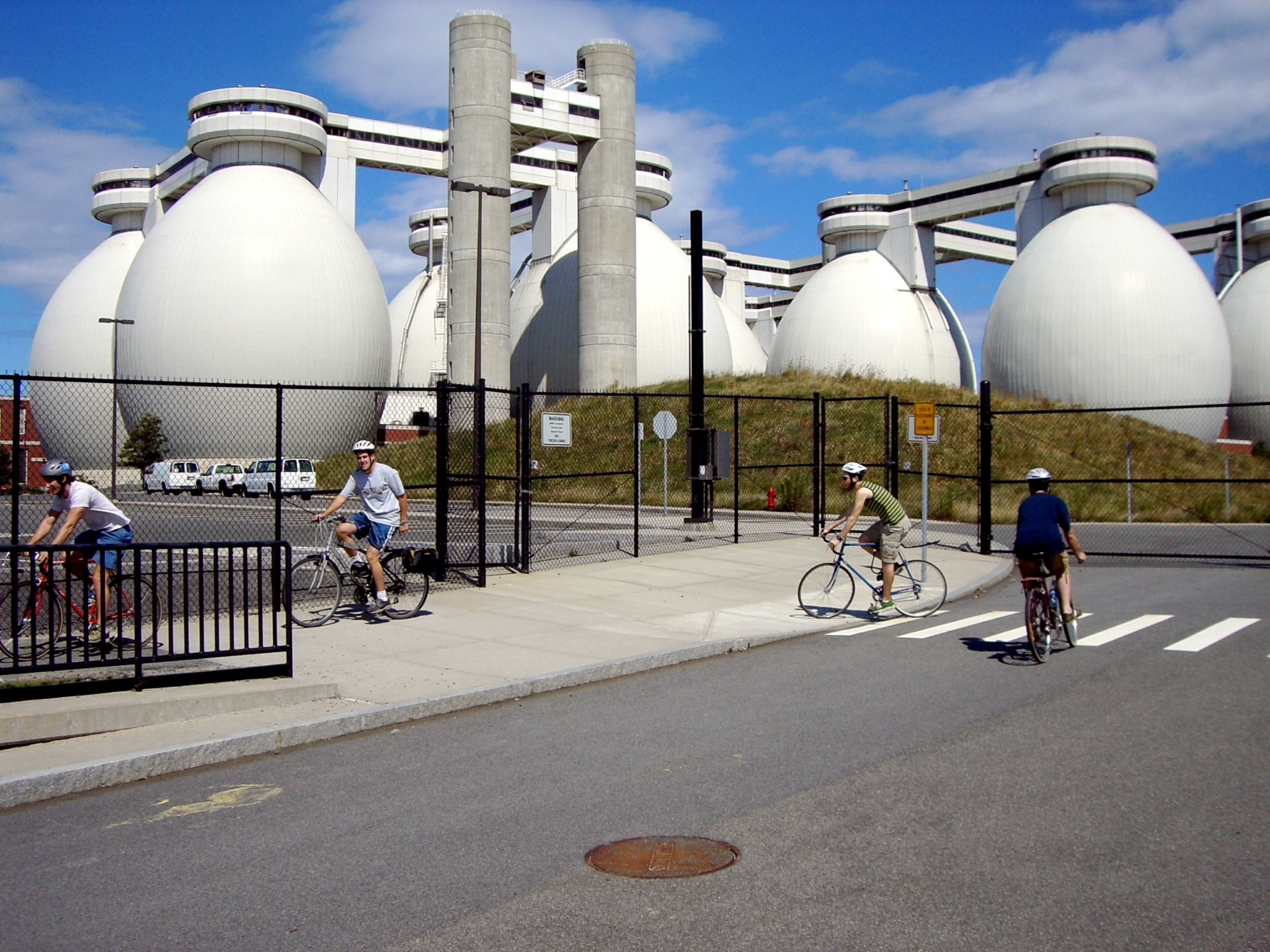
Cyclists visiting "egg" digesters on Deer Island

The Deer Island Waste Water Treatment Plant (also known as Deer Island Sewage Treatment Plant or Deer Island Treatment Plant or DITP) is located on Deer Island, one of the Boston Harbor Islands in Boston Harbor. The plant is operated by the Massachusetts Water Resources Authority (MWRA) and began partial operations in 1995. The facility was fully operational in 2000 with the completion of the marine outfall tunnel.

Deer Island is the second largest sewage treatment plant in the United States. Its effluent is discharged into Massachusetts Bay through one of the longest underwater single-entry marine outfall tunnels in the world.

== History ==
From the 1880s until 1991, the northeastern side of Deer Island was the location of the Deer Island Prison.

The first sanitary sewer system for the Boston area, serving eighteen cities and towns, opened in 1884. It collected raw sewage to Moon Island in the harbor, and discharged it 500 feet (150 m) off shore into the Atlantic Ocean, with the ebbing tide.

In 1889, the Metropolitan Sewerage District was established. Over the next fifteen years, the agency built one of the finest regional sewerage collection systems in the country, although it still discharged raw sewage directly into the ocean.

By 1940 there were three outlets (on Nut, Deer, and Moon islands), for the discharge of raw sewage into the ocean. This sewage had contaminated nearby shellfish beds to the point that discussions of building treatment plants began. The Nut Island plant opened in 1951. The Deer Island plant opened in 1968, and the Moon Island plant was converted to standby, overflow operation.

The treatment plant is a key part of the program to protect Boston Harbor from pollution released by sewer systems in eastern Massachusetts, as mandated by a 1984 federal court ruling by Judge Paul G. Garrity, in a case brought under the Clean Water Act. These lawsuits culminated in Federal District Judge A. David Mazzone’s 1985 ruling that made the cleanup of the Boston Harbor a non-voluntary, court-ordered mandate.

The Metropolitan Sewerage District was reorganized into the larger Massachusetts Water Resources Authority in 1985. Under the federal court order, the MWRA completely rebuilt the treatment system between 1985 and 2000. Subsequently, all sewage is treated and the processed effluent is discharged at the sea floor 9.5 miles (15.3 km) from shore.

After nearly a decade of construction, the project ended in tragedy with the deaths of two divers deep in the marine outfall tunnel 10 miles (16 km) from the tunnel entrance. The contractors who built the tunnel had completed their work and departed, taking critical life-support equipment with them but leaving temporary plugs in place at the far end and the $3.8 billion project at a standstill. A team of five divers drove two Humvees equipped with an unproven air supply system 9 miles (14 km) into the tunnel, supplied with air through umbilical cables connected to the vehicles. When the divers returned to the vehicles, they found the other two workers unconscious. The three surviving divers returned to the entrance with their unconscious colleagues, who were pronounced dead at a local hospital.

In 2017, MWRA, Massport, the US Army Corps of Engineers, and Eversource reached a settlement to re-lay the Deer Island power cable that was blocking bigger ships from docking at Conley Terminal. The cable was laid too shallow by Boston Edison across the Reserved Channel in Boston Harbor, violating its permit and blocking the Corps from dredging a deeper shipping channel. In August 2019, a replacement cable was energized, requiring the Deer Island facility to run on backup power for a few days, but adding a redundant fiber optic line from South Boston. Eversource paid $17.5 million to reimburse the remaining value of the existing cable, and MWRA sewer customers are paying $97.5 million for the re-laying.

== Operation ==
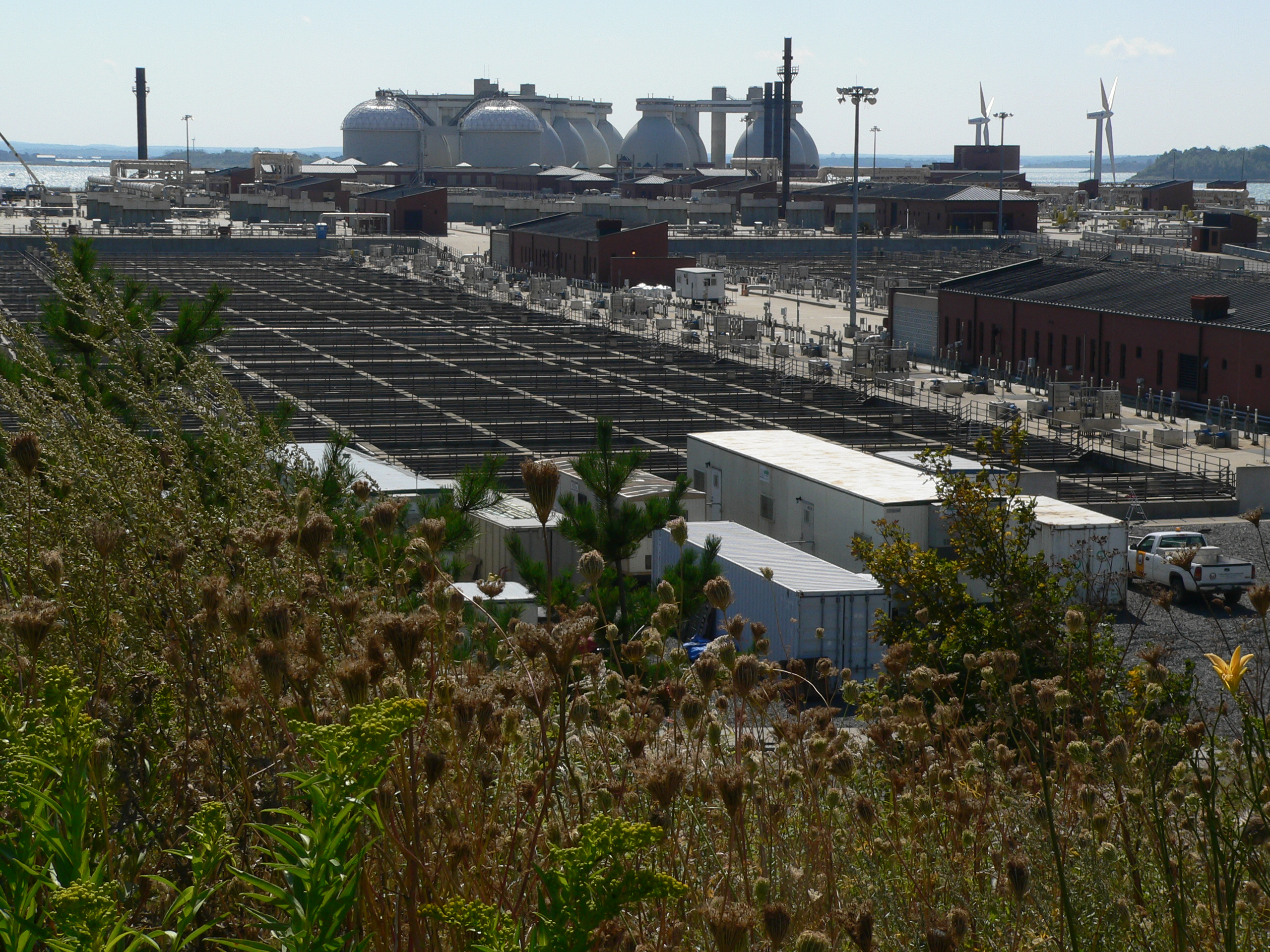
Deer Island Wastewater Treatment Plant, 2009

Wastewater from the 43 communities in the Boston area served by the MWRA reaches the plant through four tunnels. Three pump stations with a combined capacity of 1,270,000,000 US gallons (4.8×10^{9} L; 1.06×10^{9} imp gal) per day (mgd) lift the wastewater about 150 feet (46 m) to primary treatment clarifiers that use gravity to remove about half of the pollutants. The next stage, secondary treatment, uses pure oxygen to activate microorganisms that consume organic matter. Deer Island cryogenically extracts 130 to 220 tons of oxygen per day from the atmosphere for this purpose.

An ongoing maintenance challenge is the deposition of struvite, a mineral which builds up inside pipes, pumps, and other mechanisms handling sewage. The buildup of hardened deposits eventually interferes with smooth flow of process fluids. and can cause damage to pumps and valves. At present, the MWRA uses treatment with ferric chloride to convert the struvite into vivianite, which is more easily disposed of, as well as mechanical chipping of deposits. Research has been done to find ways of converting the mineral deposits, which contain ammonia and phosphate, into valuable nutritional fertilizer supplements.

Sludge and scum from the primary and secondary treatment stages are concentrated and thickened with addition of a polymer. This material is fed to twelve 130-foot (40 m) tall, 90-foot (27 m) diameter egg-shaped anaerobic digesters. Methane gas produced by the digestion process is burned to make steam which is fed to a turbine that generates about 3 megawatts of electricity and provides heat for the treatment processes and keeping buildings warm. (Additional on-site power began generation by two 600 kW wind turbines in 2009).

Digested sludge is then sent across the harbor via a tunnel to a pelletizing plant at the Fore River Shipyard in Quincy. The output is sold as fertilizer and shipped to customers by rail and truck.

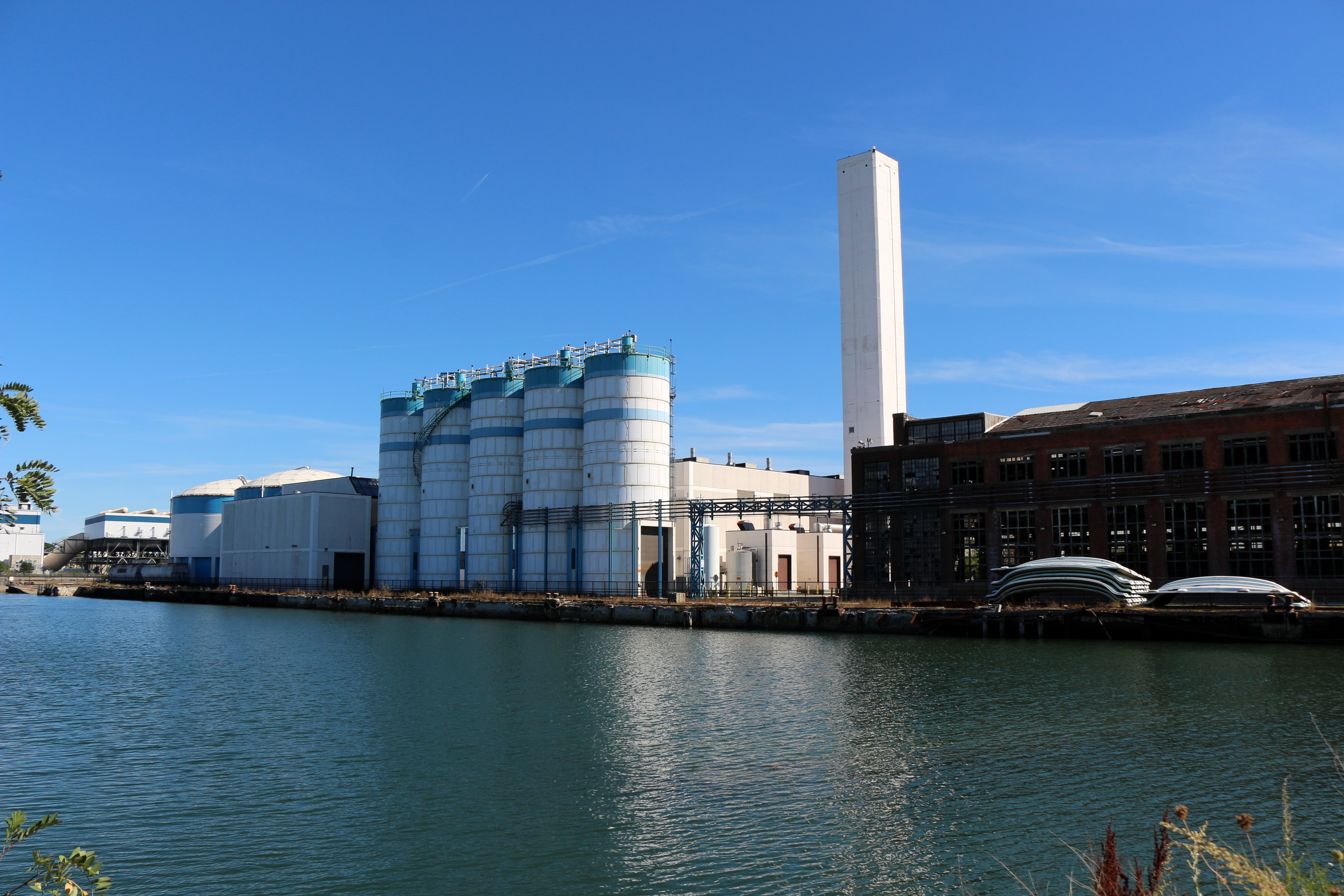
MWRA pelletizing plant in Quincy, Massachusetts

After secondary treatment, 85% of the pollutants in the waste stream have been removed. The stream is then treated with sodium hypochlorite to kill bacteria, and then with sodium bisulfite to remove residual chlorine, to protect marine life near the discharge outlets.

The waste stream then flows into a 9.5-mile (15.3 km) long, 24-foot (7.3 m) diameter gravity-powered marine outfall tunnel that slopes underneath the bay towards a depth of 100 feet (30 m) in the ocean. It is one of the longest underwater single-entry marine outfall tunnels in the world. In the last mile of the tunnel, 52 mushroom-shaped riser pipes carry treated effluent up from the tunnel to the ocean floor, where it is dispersed.

Before the new plant fully opened in 2000, the Deer Island plant had average flow capacity of 343,000,000 US gallons (1.30×10^{9} L; 286,000,000 imp gal) per day (343 mgd, million gallons per day), and peak flow capacity of 848 mgd. The old facility relied on combined sewer overflows an average of 60 days per year, with a total of about 10 billion gallons per year of untreated sewage flowing directly into Boston Harbor. The new plant has a peak capacity of 1.2 billion gal/day, with average flows of 380 mgd, and no raw sewage discharges from the facility itself.

However as of 2026, there still are many legacy collector systems upstream which occasionally may discharge storm overflow raw sewage into local waterways. Efforts continue to fully separate sanitary sewer systems from storm sewer systems, to completely abolish overflow discharge of raw sewage.
