= West Street District =

- U.S. National Register of Historic Places
- U.S. Historic district
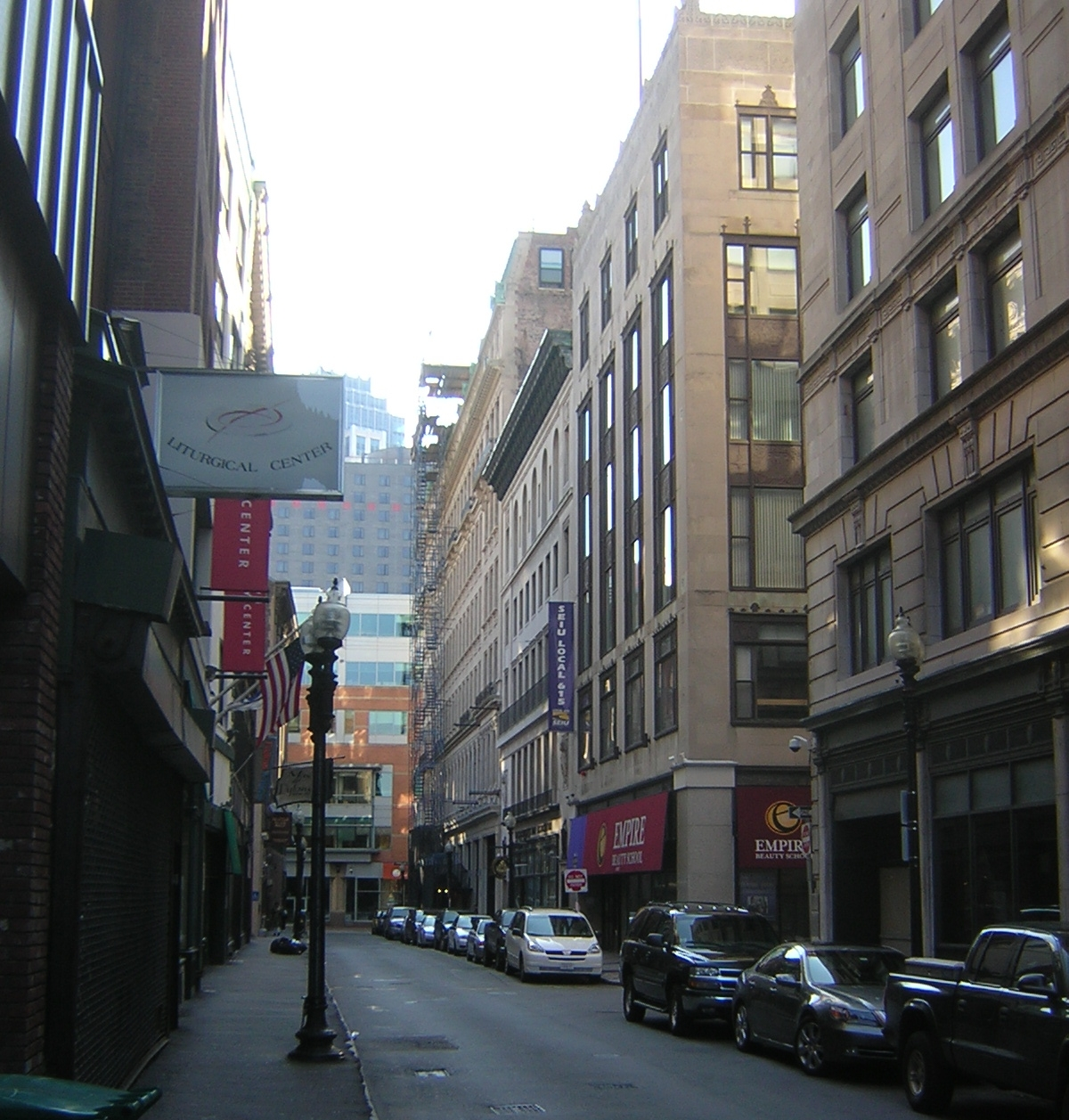

- Location within Boston Location within Massachusetts Location within the United States
- Location: West St., Boston, Massachusetts
- Coordinates: 42°21′17.04″N 71°3′44.88″W
- Area: 0.6 acres (0.24 ha)
- Architect: Leland, Joseph D., & Co.; Coolidge, Shepley, Bulfinch & Abbott
- Architectural style: Chicago, Classical Revival, Renaissance
- MPS: Boston Theatre MRA
- NRHP reference No.: 80000455
- Added to NRHP: December 09, 1980

The West Street District is a historic district on West Street in Boston, Massachusetts, one of the city's "ladder districts" that runs between Tremont Street and Washington Street in the Downtown Crossing commercial/retail area. The district includes four buildings located near the corner of Tremont and West Streets, all built in the early 20th century. The two buildings at 148-150 Tremont Street were once occupied by Chandler and Company, an exclusive department store. Number 148 is a Renaissance Revival structure built as an office building in 1912, and number 150 was built in 1903 to house the Oliver Ditson Company, a music publisher. The Fabyan building at 26-30 West Street was designed by Coolidge, Shepley, Bulfinch & Abbott, and built in 1926. The Schraffts Building at 16-24 West Street was built in 1922, and housed a flagship candy store and restaurant for more than fifty years.

The West Street District was added to the National Register of Historic Places in 1980.

== Gallery ==
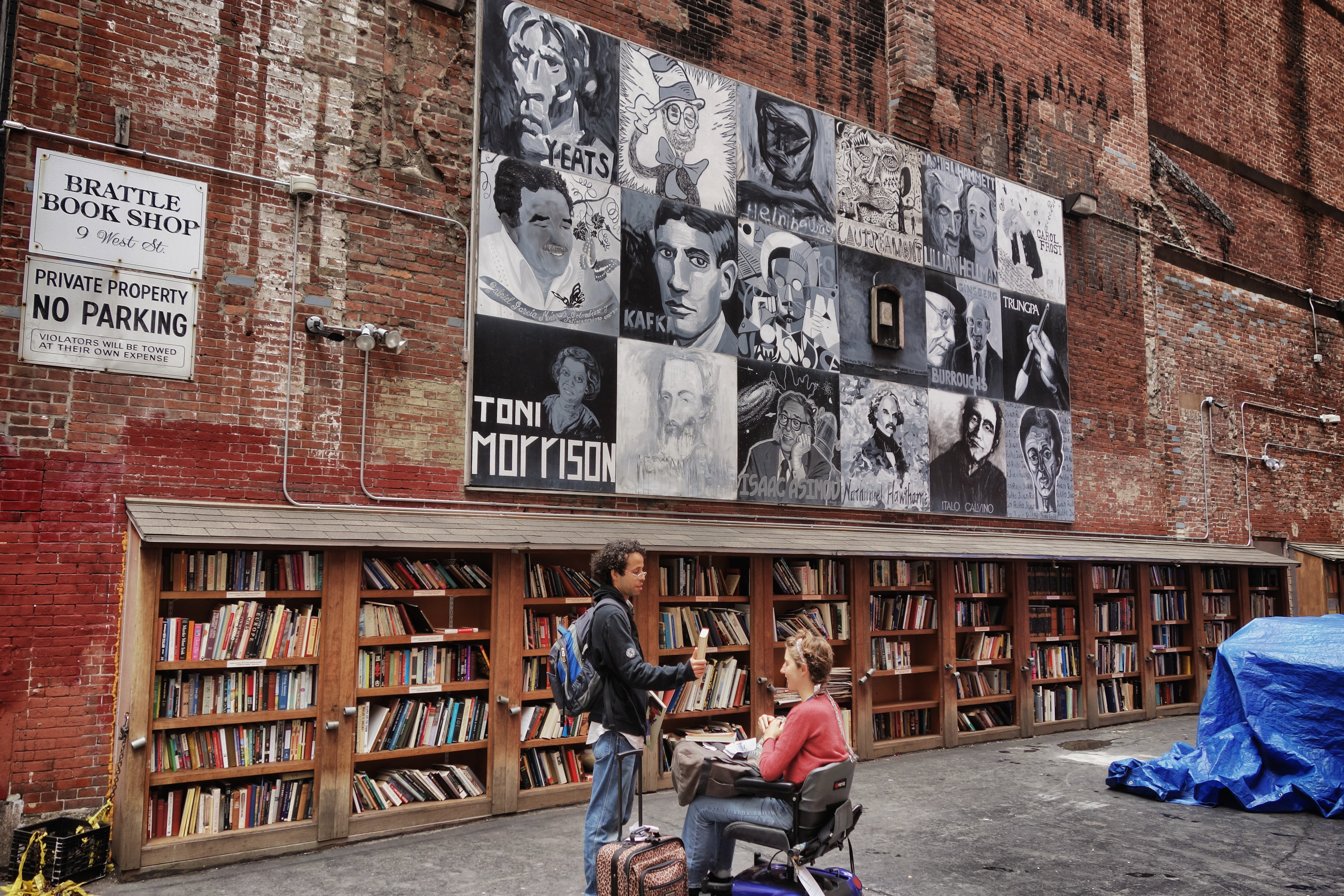
Brattle Book Shop, 9 West Street, an outdoor bookstore.

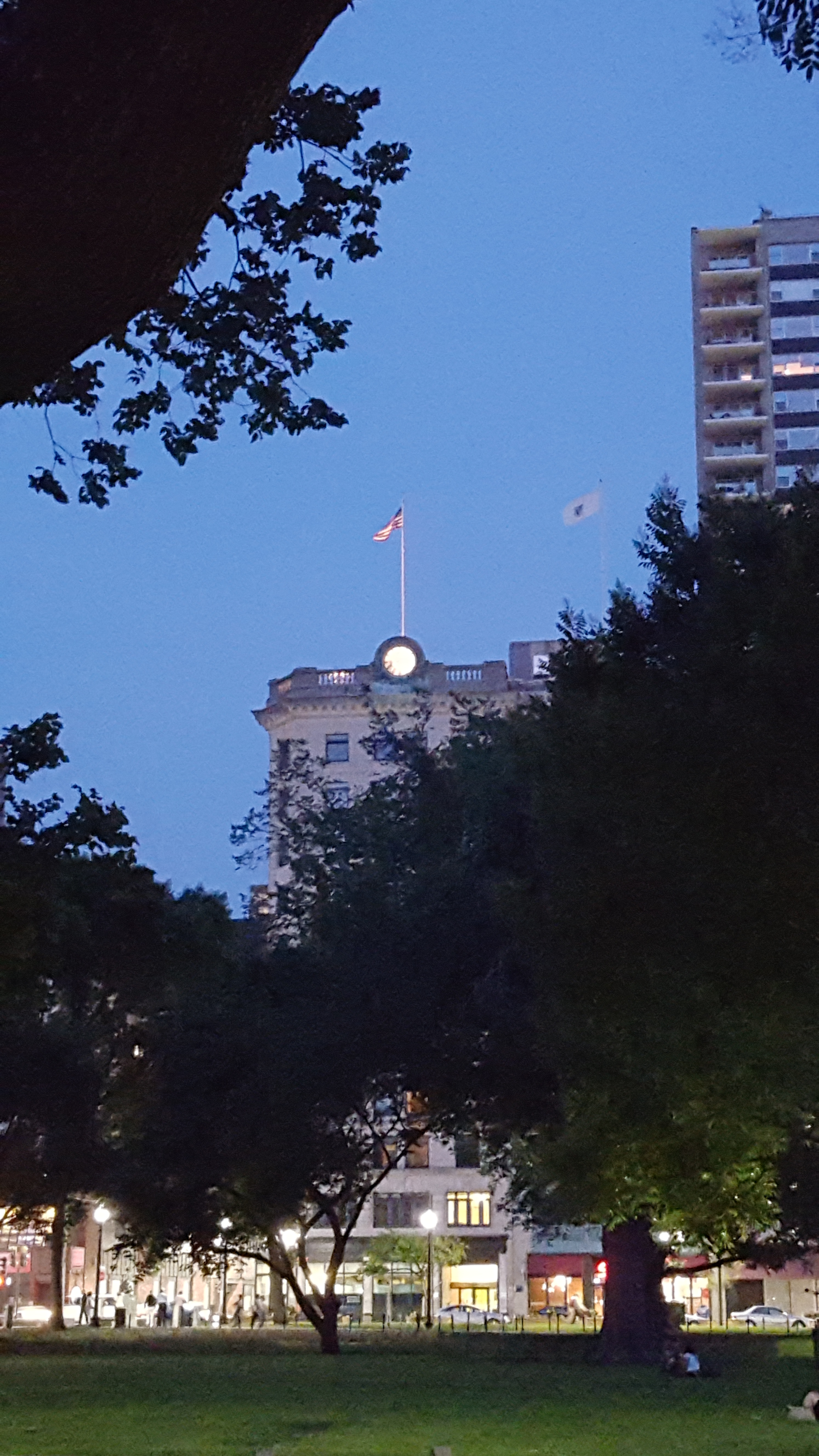
50 Tremont Street, 2015

== See also ==
- National Register of Historic Places listings in northern Boston, Massachusetts
