= William G. Gross =

American police officer

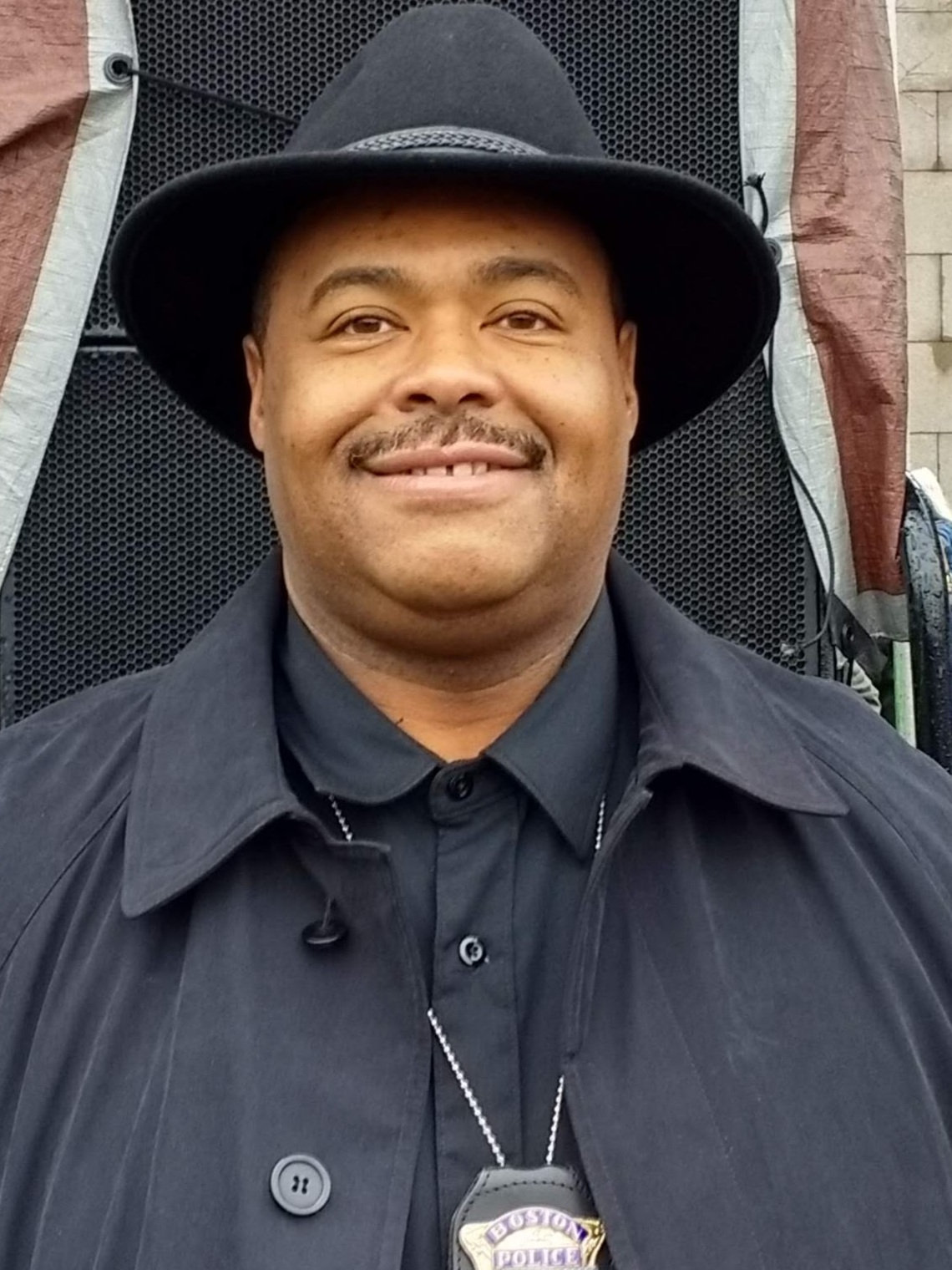
- Gross attending a Disabled American Veterans event in South Boston in 2018

Commissioner of the Boston Police Department
- In office August 6, 2018 – January 29, 2021
- Mayor: Marty Walsh
- Preceded by: William B. Evans
- Succeeded by: Dennis White

Personal details
- Born: 1963 or 1964 (age 62–63) Maryland
- Education: Quincy College

William G. Gross (born c. 1964) is an American police officer who served as Commissioner of the Boston Police Department for 29 months, from August 2018 to January 2021.

== Early life and education ==
Gross was born in rural Maryland to a single mother, the middle of three children, and moved to Boston at the age of 12. He graduated from Boston Technical High School (now the John D. O'Bryant School of Mathematics & Science). He then entered the Boston Police Cadet Program, becoming a Patrol Officer two years later in 1984.

Gross earned an Associate in Science degree in Criminal Justice from Quincy College in 2017.

== Boston Police Department ==
As a patrol officer, Gross served in the Anti-Youth Violence Strike Force and the Drug Control Unit, and later was an instructor at the Boston Police Academy. He achieved the ranks of Sergeant and Sergeant Detective, and then became Deputy Superintendent in 2008, where he attended community meetings to address specific neighborhood crime concerns. In 2010, he became commander of the Field Support Division, which includes the Anti-Youth Violence Strike Force and the School Police Unit. In 2012, he was promoted to Superintendent, Night Commander. In March 2017, Gross was again promoted, becoming the first Black Superintendent-in-Chief of the Boston police.

=== Commissioner ===
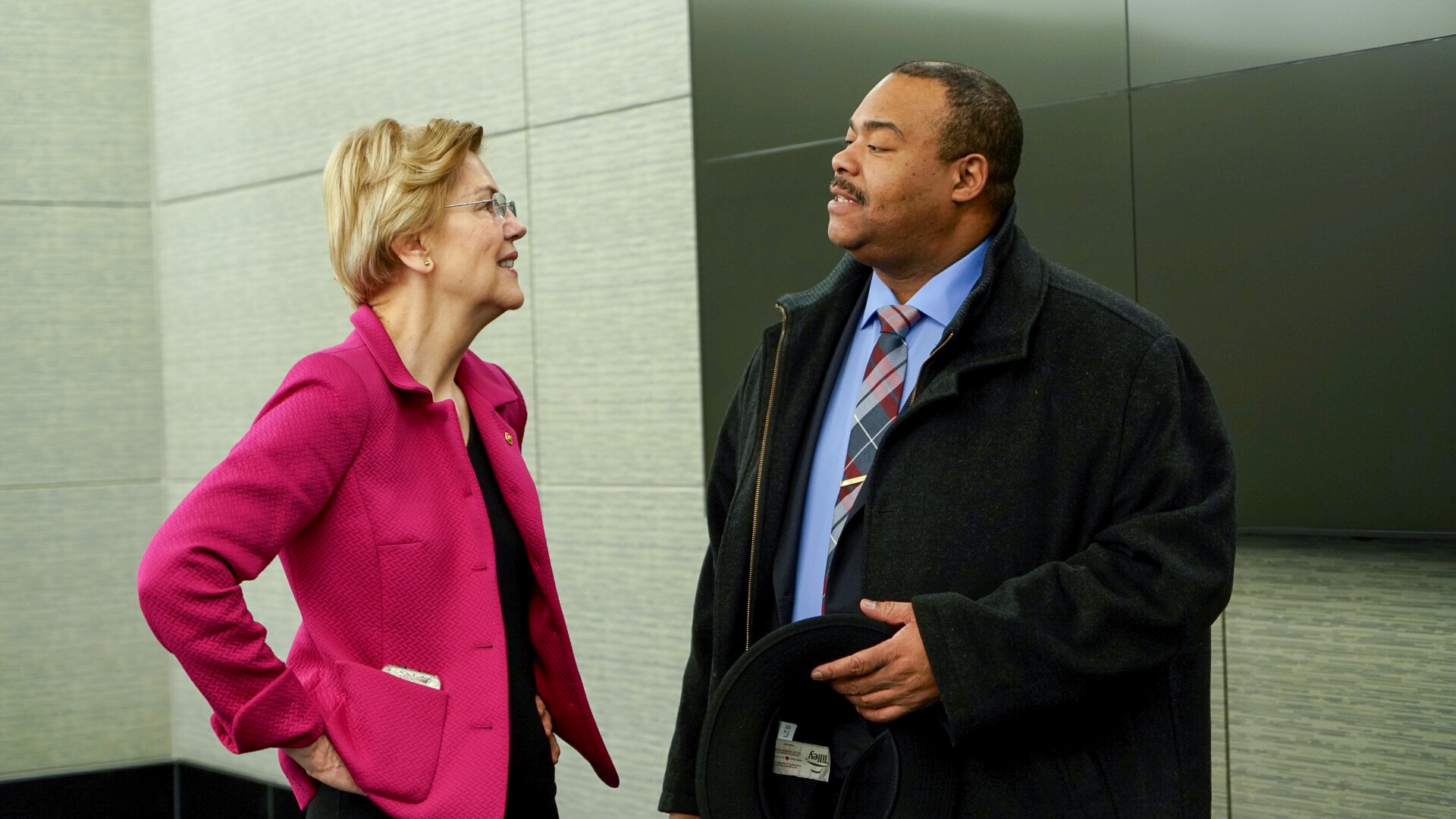
Gross speaks with U.S. Senator Elizabeth Warren at a 2020 Martin Luther King Jr. Day event

On August 6, 2018, Boston mayor Marty Walsh officiated the ceremony during which Gross was sworn in as Commissioner of the Boston Police Department. Gross became the department's 42nd commissioner. When Gross resigned Boston's annual homicide rate (57 killings) was at an eight year high. He oversaw a review of the department's use-of-force policies, allowed officers to arm themselves with chemical weapons, police body cameras were issued to half the force, and he established the first Bureau of Community Engagement for the Boston police.

On the afternoon of January 28, 2021, Gross announced his near-immediate retirement to be effective the next morning. The retirement was considered "abrupt," with Gross citing the desire to spend more time with family. The Boston Globe reported several months later that Gross had experienced a health scare, which prompted his retirement. Superintendent Dennis White was immediately named as his successor by Walsh. White was formally sworn in on February 1, and two days later was placed on leave after court records documenting domestic violence surfaced.

== Post-retirement ==
Gross, a conservative registered as an independent, considered becoming a candidate in the 2021 Boston mayoral election, but stated at the time of his retirement that he decided against running. In May 2021, Gross endorsed Boston City Council member Annissa Essaibi George for mayor.

On April 4, 2026, an elderly man in his 80s began choking while dining at The Capital Grille in Chestnut Hill, Massachusetts. Gross and an off-duty police officer performed life-saving measures, and the man was successfully resuscitated.

Police appointments
Preceded by William B. Evans	Commissioner of the Boston Police Department; 2018–2021	Succeeded by Dennis White
