= Marty Walsh =

American politician and trade unionist (born 1967)

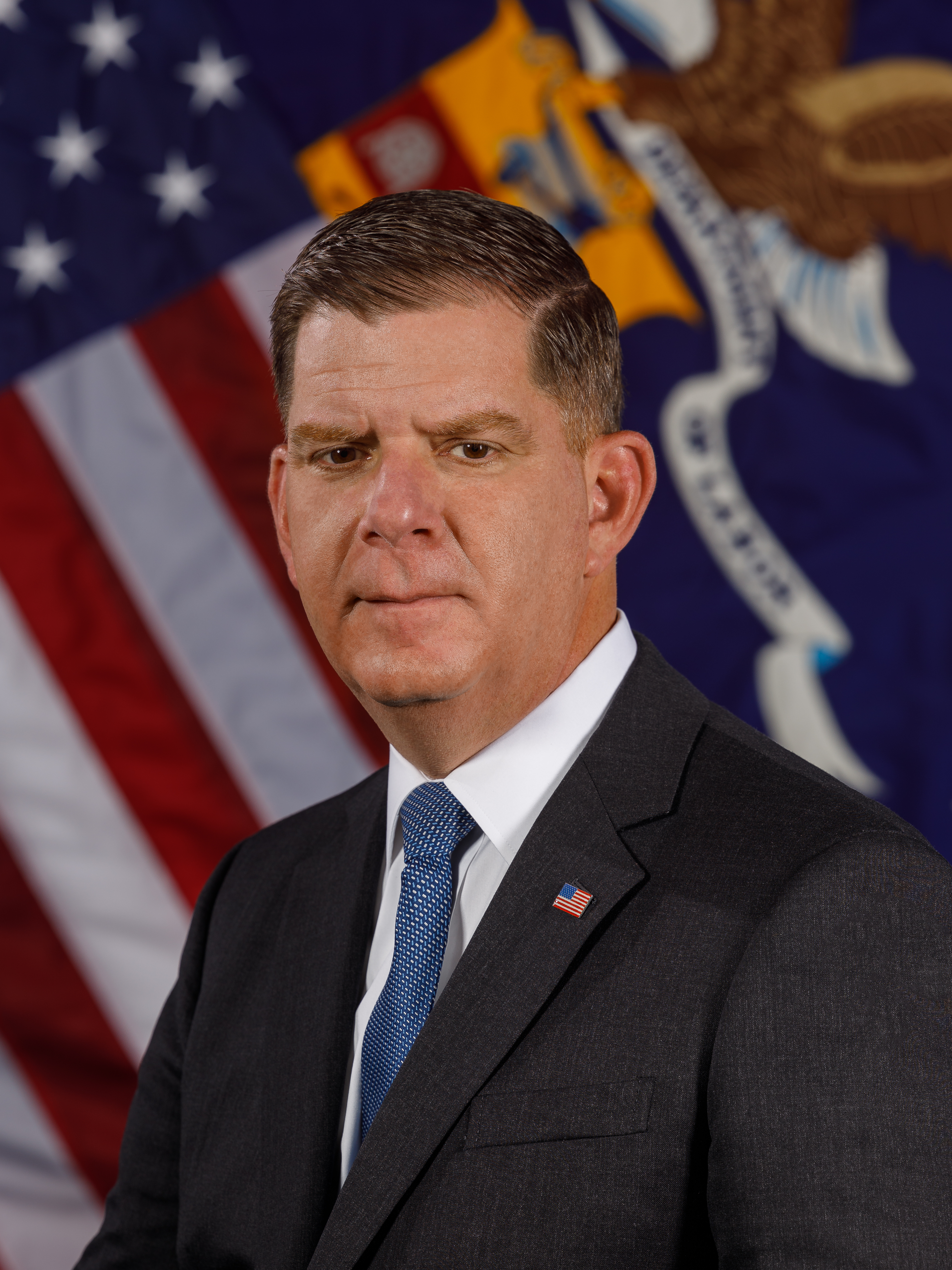
- Official portrait, 2021

6th Executive Director of the National Hockey League Players' Association
- Incumbent
- Assumed office March 13, 2023
- Preceded by: Donald Fehr

29th United States Secretary of Labor
- In office March 23, 2021 – March 11, 2023
- President: Joe Biden
- Deputy: Julie Su
- Preceded by: Eugene Scalia; Al Stewart (acting)
- Succeeded by: Julie Su (acting); Lori Chavez-DeRemer

53rd Mayor of Boston
- In office January 6, 2014 – March 22, 2021
- Preceded by: Thomas Menino
- Succeeded by: Kim Janey (acting); Michelle Wu

Member of the Massachusetts House of Representatives from the 13th Suffolk district
- In office April 12, 1997 – January 3, 2014
- Preceded by: James T. Brett
- Succeeded by: Daniel J. Hunt

General Agent of the Boston Building Trades Council
- In office January 2011 – April 2013
- Preceded by: James Coyle
- Succeeded by: Brian Doherty

Personal details
- Born: Martin Joseph Walsh; April 10, 1967 (age 59) Boston, Massachusetts, U.S.
- Party: Democratic
- Spouse: Lorrie Higgins (m. 2024)
- Education: Boston College (BA)
- Website: Official website
- Walsh's voice Walsh on the minimum wage for federal contractors. Recorded November 22, 2021

Martin Joseph Walsh (born April 10, 1967) is an American politician and trade union official who served as the 53rd mayor of Boston from 2014 to 2021 and as the 29th United States secretary of labor from 2021 to 2023. A member of the Democratic Party, Walsh resigned from his position as the US Secretary of Labor in March 2023 in order to accept a position as executive director of the National Hockey League Players' Association (NHLPA). Before his mayoralty, he served as a member of the Massachusetts House of Representatives, representing the 13th Suffolk district from 1997 until 2014. As a trade union member, Walsh worked his way up to serve as the head of the Boston Building Trades Council from 2011 until 2013.

Walsh was elected mayor of Boston in 2013 and was reelected in 2017. He was regarded as friendly towards real estate developers, and the city experienced a building boom during his mayoralty. He added policies to the city's zoning code that were inspired by the federal affirmatively furthering fair housing policy. He successfully negotiated for a 40-minute school day extension in Boston Public Schools. He also served on the leadership of the C40 Cities Climate Leadership Group. During much of his mayoralty, Boston struggled with homelessness at Mass and Cass, which was ongoing at the time Walsh departed from office. While he supported Boston's bid for the 2024 Summer Olympics, he ultimately reneged on his promise to sign the host city contract's financial guarantee, which contributed to the collapse of the bid. In 2014, Walsh signed the Boston Trust Act, a so-called "sanctuary city" ordinance, into law. Amid the first Trump administration's federal hostility towards such policies, Walsh voiced his continued support for the city remaining a sanctuary city. In 2015, he supported the passage of a city ordinance to provide municipal employees with paid parental leave. The ordinance was passed and signed into law by Walsh. He supported an ordinance in the city council which regulated short-term rental of housing units, and signed it into law in 2018. In 2016, Boston and General Electric struck a deal for the corporation to move its headquarters to Boston. At the end of his tenure, he dealt with the COVID-19 pandemic's impacts on Boston.

Serving from March 2021 until March 2023 in the Cabinet of President Joe Biden as the United States secretary of labor, Walsh was the first former union leader to serve in that position in roughly 45 years. Walsh, a recovering alcoholic who has been sober since 1995, was the first-ever Cabinet member to openly be in a twelve-step program for recovery from addiction.

Since 2023, Walsh has been the executive director of the NHLPA (the union representing professional ice hockey players in the NHL). During his tenure the union negotiated with the NHL, IOC, and IIHF terms of an arrangement to allow NHL players to compete in the 2026 and 2030 editions of the Winter Olympics. Walsh negotiated the terms of a four-year collective bargaining agreement reached in mid-2025 between the NHLPA and NHL, which will enter effect ahead of the 2026–27 season.

== Early life, education, and career ==
Walsh was born on April 10, 1967, in Dorchester, Boston, to John Walsh, an Irish American originally from Callowfeenish, a townland near Carna, County Galway, and Mary (née O'Malley), from Rosmuc, Co. Galway. Walsh's parents emigrated separately but married in the United States in 1959. His parents both left from Shannon Airport, with his father leaving in 1956 and his mother leaving in 1959.

Walsh grew up in the Savin Hill area of Dorchester, where he lived in a triple-decker. He was diagnosed with Burkitt's lymphoma at the age of 7, forcing him to miss most of second and third grade and repeat fifth grade. At the age of 11, after going through years of chemotherapy, a scan revealed no traces of the cancer. Walsh went to high school at The Newman School. While a teenager, Walsh would begin drinking beer, ultimately becoming an alcoholic. Walsh would later seek treatment after hitting what he considered "rock bottom" in 1995.

Walsh initially dropped out of college and entered the field of construction. He later took night classes as an adult, and received a Bachelor of Arts degree in social science from the Woods College of Advancing Studies at Boston College in 2009.

In an early venture into politics, Walsh was a political volunteer for President of the Massachusetts Senate William Bulger. Walsh later volunteered for State Representative James T. Brett's campaign in the 1993 Boston mayoral election. Brett lost to Thomas Menino, who Walsh would numerous times come to be at odds with during his political career.

== Massachusetts state representative (1997–2014) ==
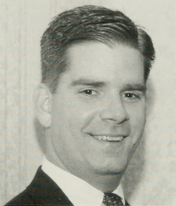
Walsh as a member of the Massachusetts House of Representatives

=== Elections ===
In 1996, Walsh ran an unsuccessful write-in campaign for the Massachusetts House of Representatives seat that James T. Brett had vacated. Despite resigning his seat, Brett was still listed on the ballot for the regularly scheduled 1996 election. As the only name listed on the ballot, Brett defeated Walsh and other write-in candidates. Since Brett did not take his seat, a special election was held in 1997, which Walsh won. Among those that Walsh defeated in the Democratic Party's primary election were Assistant District Attorney Martha Coakley and attorneys Charles Tevnan and James Hunt III (the latter being the former chief of staff to State Senator W. Paul White). Michael Jonas of The Boston Globe reported that Walsh's victory benefited from "organizational ties and personal loyalties," with Walsh performing particularly strong in his own neighborhood of Savin Hill. Walsh's seat, the 13th district of Suffolk County, represented Dorchester as well as one precinct in Quincy. Walsh was reelected to eight two-year terms, often unopposed.

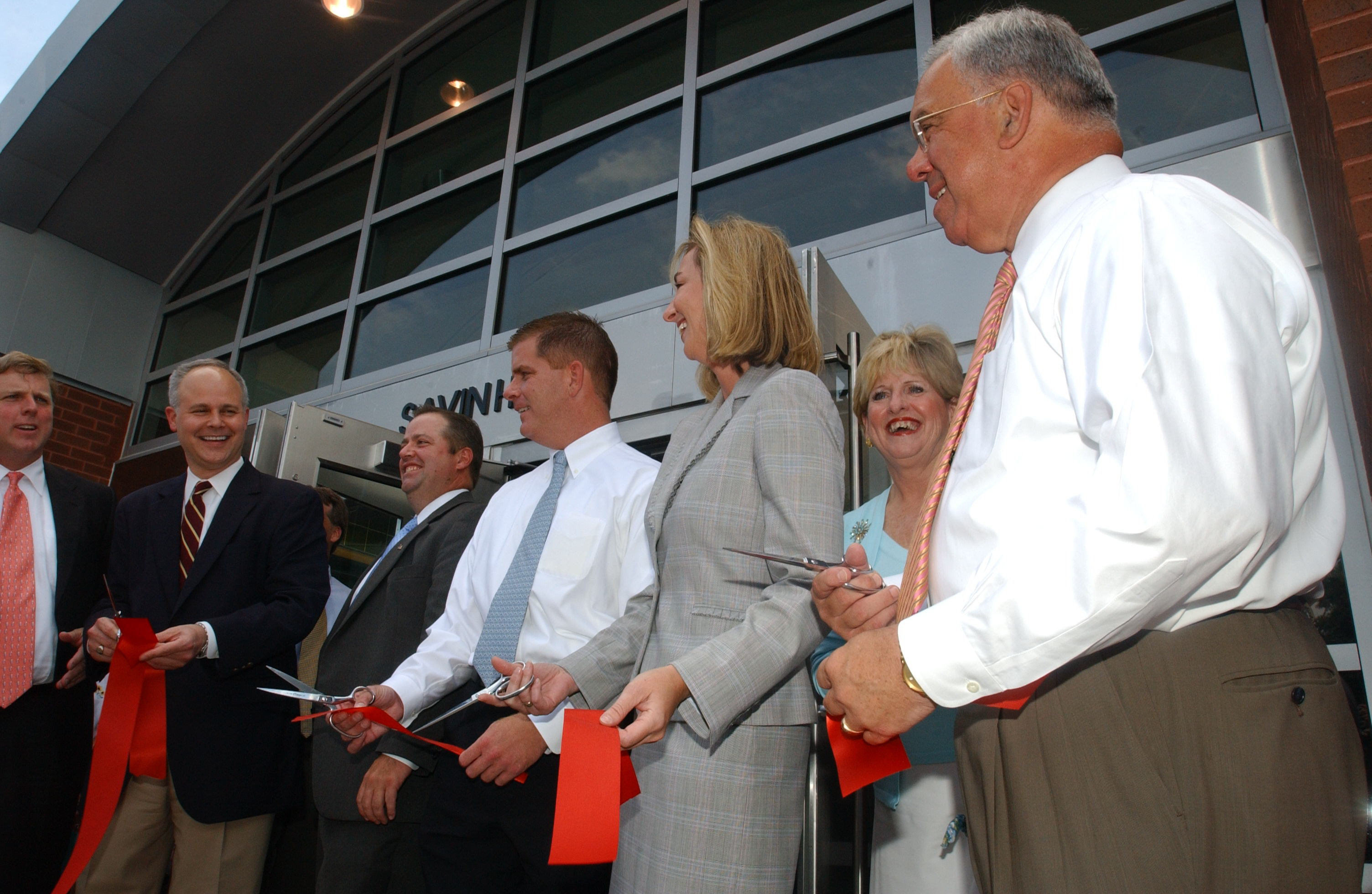
2005 ribbon cutting ceremony for the renovated Savin Hill station. L–R: Boston City Council President Michael F. Flaherty, Massachusetts Secretary of Transportation Daniel Grabauskas, State Senator Jack Hart, Walsh, Lieutenant Governor Kerry Healy, Boston City Councilor Maureen Feeney, Boston Mayor Thomas Menino

=== Committee assignments ===
During his tenure, Walsh served as the co-chair for the Special Commission on Public Construction Reform. He also served as chair of the House Homeland Security and Federal Affairs Committee, as well as the chair of the House Committee on Ethics. He was also vice chair of the Joint Committee on Consumer Protection and Professional Licensure and the vice chair of the Joint Committee on Municipalities and Regional Government. Other committees he served on included the Joint Committee on Banks and Banking; Joint Committee on Environment, Natural Resources and Agriculture; Joint Committee on Health Care; Joint Committee on the Judiciary; Joint Committee on Mental Health and Substance Abuse, Joint Committee on Public Safety; House Personnel and Administration Committee; and House Steering, Policy and Scheduling Committee.

=== Votes and sponsored legislation ===
Walsh supported same-sex marriage. In 2004, Walsh voted against legislation that would define marriage in Massachusetts as being between "one man and one woman". The following year, he voted against separate legislation that would have limited marriage to heterosexual couples. In supporting Walsh's 2013 mayoral campaign, Arline Isaacson, co-chairwoman of the Massachusetts Gay and Lesbian Political Caucus, credited Walsh with having worked to urge more conservative members of the state legislature against passing a ban on same-sex marriage after a 2004 decision by the Massachusetts Supreme Judicial Court legalized same-sex marriage in Massachusetts. In 2007, Walsh voted against a same-sex marriage ban, which was defeated 45–151. In 2013 and 2023 interviews, Walsh has called this, "the proudest vote I ever took as a state legislator." In 2013, Walsh was one of several legislators that signed onto a joint petition introduced by Representative Sarah Peake and Senator Patricia D. Jehlen that established the Special Commission on LGBT Aging.

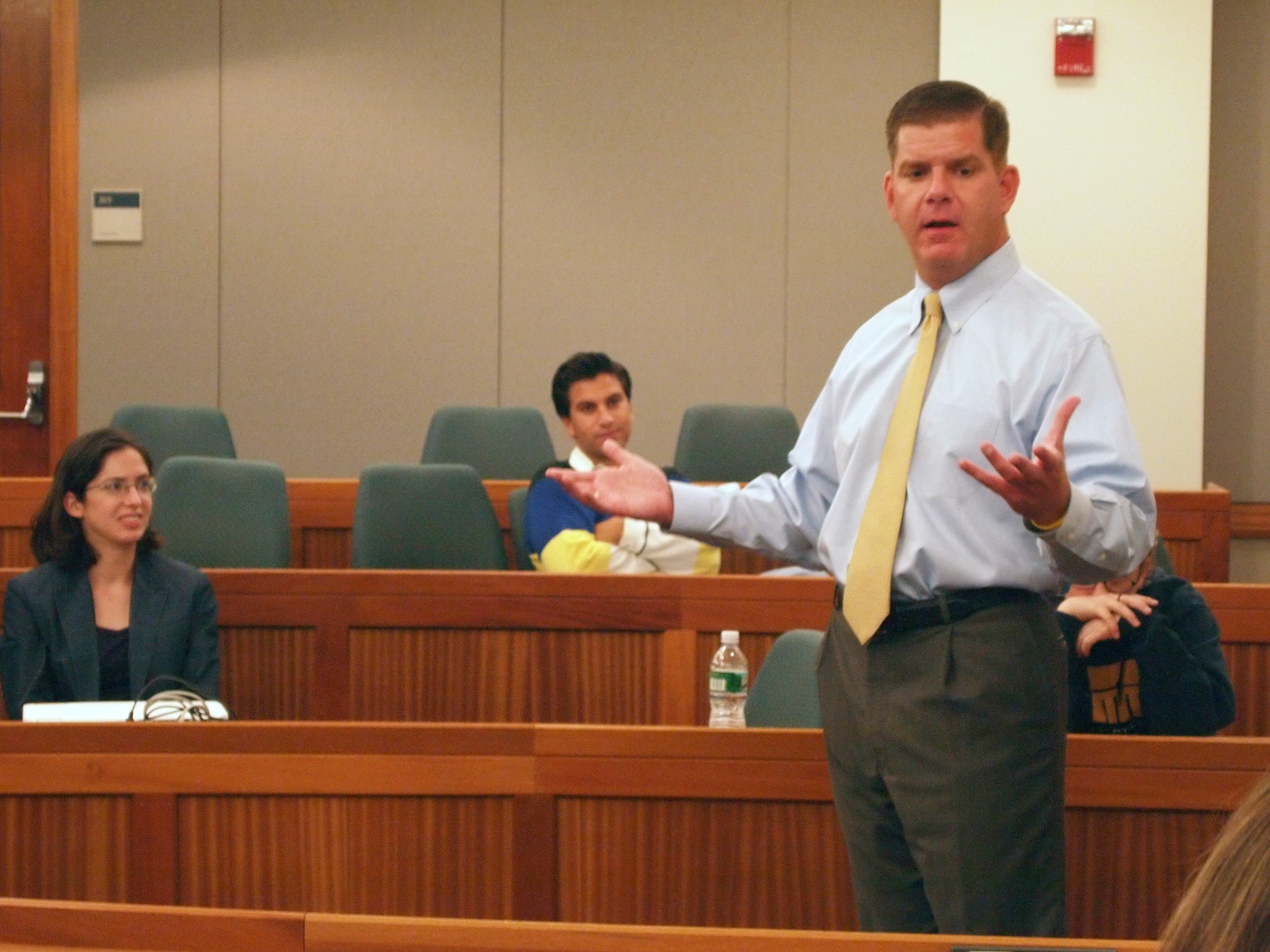
Walsh speaking in 2009

After Governor Mitt Romney used his gubernatorial veto in 2005 on a bill to expand the research of human stem cells in Massachusetts, Walsh voted against overturning the governor's veto. In 2005, he voted against reinstating capital punishment in Massachusetts. He co-sponsored legislation that would permit undocumented immigrants to receive in-state tuition at universities. The legislation was defeated 95–56 in January 2006. In 1998, he opposed Massachusetts Question 2, a ballot measure that would have decriminalized possession of less than an ounce of cannabis.

Ahead of the ultimate 2006 passage of the Massachusetts health care reform, Walsh supported efforts related to reform healthcare in Massachusetts with the goal of universal coverage. Walsh joined the vast majority of the House in voting in support of the healthcare reform legislation that was ultimately enacted (only two state house members voted against the legislation). After the healthcare reform legislation was partially signed into law by Governor Romney, Walsh voted for the successful overrides of Romney's partial vetos on segments of it.

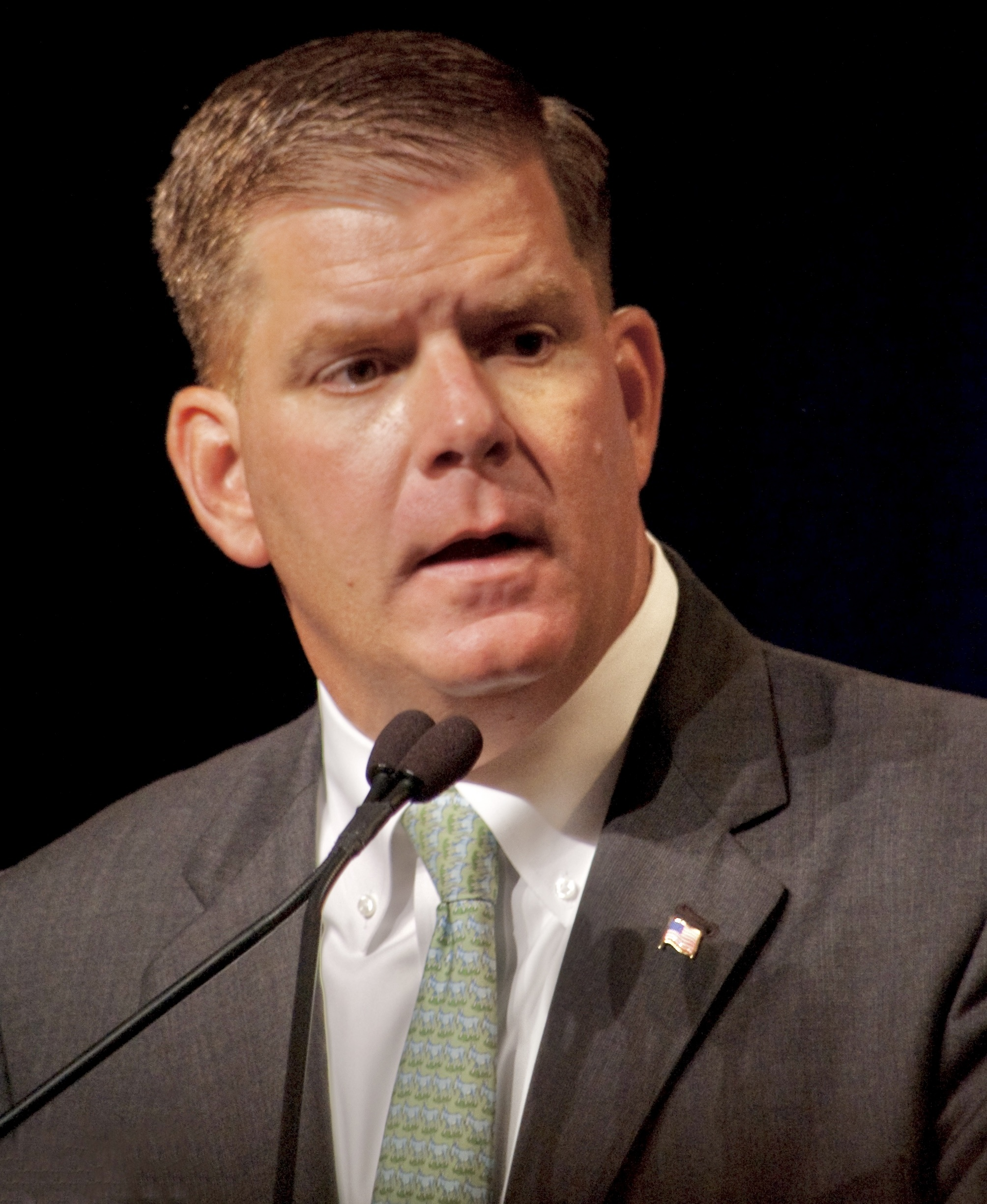
Walsh speaking in 2010

Walsh was one of a number of co-sponsors on legislation to have Massachusetts join the National Popular Vote Interstate Compact which passed in the House on July 9, 2008. In 2010, Walsh voted in support of similar legislation which passed the legislature and was signed into law by Governor Deval Patrick.

On February 13, 2013, Walsh introduced a bill to have The Modern Lovers song "Roadrunner" be named the official rock song of Massachusetts. The song's writer, Jonathan Richman, came out against this, saying, "I don't think the song is good enough to be a Massachusetts song of any kind."

=== Other matters ===
Despite some organized local opposition from civic associations, Walsh supported the Pine Street Inn organization in their pursuit of converting a six-family house in his district into transitional housing for the homeless. Despite support by fellow union leaders for the construction of dormitories on the University of Massachusetts Boston's campus, Walsh sided with many of his constituents in opposing their construction.

In 2002, Walsh considered resigning from the state house in order to accept an appointment to serve as Suffolk County registrar of deeds, but ultimately declined the position and remained in the state house.

In 2008, Walsh supported John H. Rogers's unsuccessful effort to beat out Robert DeLeo to serve as the next speaker of the Massachusetts House of Representatives.

== Local union leadership positions (2001–2013) ==
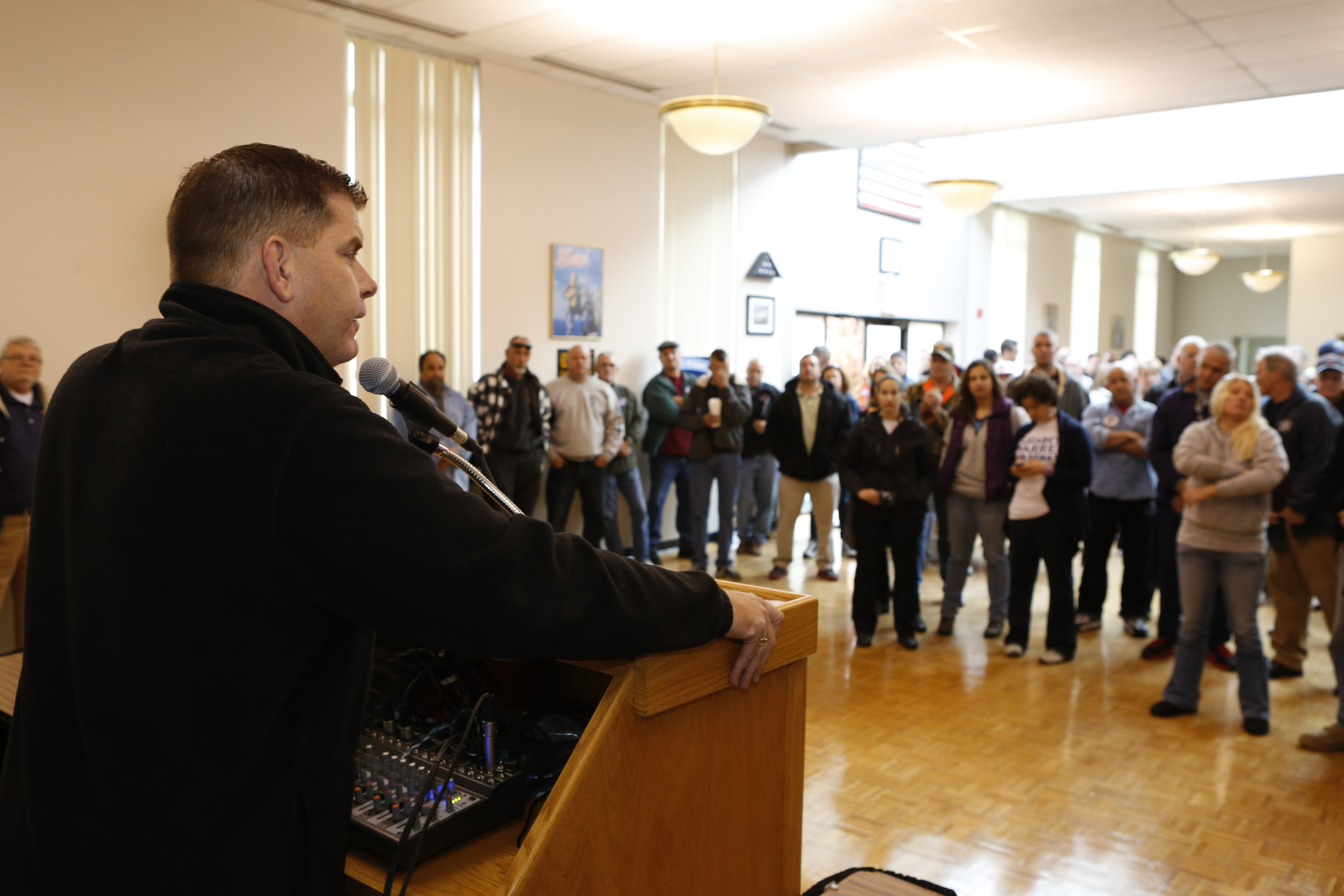
Walsh speaking to trade union volunteers for the 2012 Senate campaign of Elizabeth Warren

Working as a construction worker, at the age of 21 in 1988 Walsh joined Laborers' Union Local 223. In 2001 he became its secretary, and in 2005 he became its president. He served as its president until he became the mayor of Boston. He also served as a co-chair of the Massachusetts Democratic Party Labor Caucus.

In late-2010, Walsh was elected to serve as both the secretary-treasurer and general agent of Boston Building Trades Council, a union umbrella group representing 35,000 union construction workers. The General Agent is the head of the group, and Walsh formally succeeded James Coyle in the office in January 2011. The position of general manager paid Walsh $175,000 annually. He resigned as general agent in April 2013 when he announced that he was running for mayor, but at the time retained his position as president of Laborer's Union Local 223 (resigning it after winning the mayoralty).

Walsh received a reputation for being a tough negotiator on behalf of the Boston Building Trades Council. As its general agent in 2011, he negotiated a 4% pay increase for 175 employees of the Boston Housing Authority.

In 2016, news emerged that, when Walsh was the general agent, his phone calls had been wiretapped by federal authorities in 2012 as part of an investigation. The Boston Globe reported that sources indicated that the investigation looked into whether, "organized labor used its influence with local governments to extort developers for construction jobs in Greater Boston."

A conversation was leaked in which he told a local union leader that he wanted a developer to use union labor at its Somerville, Massachusetts Assembly Row development, and that he wanted that local union's business manager to contact Boston Mayor Thomas Menino to have a Boston project by the company "thrown off the docket" of the Boston Zoning Board of Appeal. Michael Levenson of The Boston Globe described news that Walsh had seemingly utilized "strong-arm" tactics as causing some to question the validity of Walsh's prior reputation for having been "a fair-minded labor leader."

== Mayoralty (2014–2021) ==
=== Elections ===
In April 2013, Walsh announced he would run for Mayor of Boston in the 2013 mayoral election. He resigned his Trades Council position in April 2013 after formally announcing his bid for mayor. When Walsh initially announced his candidacy, he lacked substantial name recognition outside of his own state house district. David Scharfenberg of WBUR considered Walsh's candidacy as being, "built on his against-the-odds biography: a son of Irish immigrants who overcame a childhood fight against cancer and a young adult's struggle with alcoholism."

On September 24, 2013, Walsh received a plurality of the vote, among twelve candidates in the mayoral preliminary election, with 18.4% of the vote. As a result, he advanced to the general election, facing second place vote-getter Boston City Councilor John R. Connolly, who received 17.2% of the vote. Walsh defeated Connolly in the general election on November 5, 2013, with 51.5% of the vote, compared to Connolly's 48.1%. Walsh's roughly 5,000-vote victory was aided by a strong performance in communities of color.

Walsh received strong funding from trade unions. Andrew Ryan of Boston.com wrote that the general election featured very few policy differences, and that Walsh won, in part, by projecting an "everyman" image and sharing a "compelling life story" involving his immigrant roots, childhood battle with cancer, and his battle with alcoholism. Ryan also credited the general election endorsements of eliminated mayoral candidates John Barros, Felix G. Arroyo, and Charlotte Golar Richie as helping Walsh to overcome Connolly's initial polling lead. Among the factors that have been credited for his victory over Connolly in the general election was a last-minute half-million dollars in television advertising against Connolly and in support of Walsh, secretly funded by the Boston Teachers Union. Connolly was a supporter of charter schools, and his education reform proposals had run into opposition from the union.

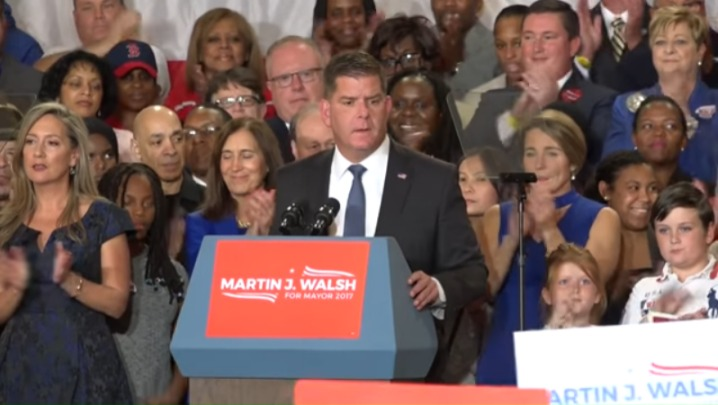
Walsh delivering a victory speech after his 2017 reelection

In July 2017, Walsh announced he would seek a second term in the 2017 mayoral election. On September 26, 2017, he received 62% of the vote in the preliminary election. He advanced to the general election and faced second place vote-getter, Boston City Councilor Tito Jackson, who had received 29% of the vote. Walsh defeated Jackson in the general election held on November 7, with 65% of the vote, compared to Jackson's 34%. Walsh was sworn in for his second term on January 1, 2018; then-former vice-president Joe Biden presided at the ceremony.

Walsh served as mayor of Boston from January 2015 through March 2021.

=== City politics ===
Boston's strong mayor form of government had conventionally limited the impact that members of the Boston City Council had on the city government. However, during Walsh's mayoralty, the Boston City Council began to increasingly wield its power. The body yielded less to the mayor than previous iterations of the council had in the preceding decades, and also made use of its subpoena powers for the first time in decades. In December 2019, Milton J. Valencia of The Boston Globe opined that, beginning under the City Council presidencies of Michelle Wu (in 2016 and 2017) and Andrea Campbell (beginning in 2018), the council had "been, perhaps, the most aggressive in recent history in pushing reforms, often to the left of the mayor, on issues addressing climate change and economic and racial equity."

Walsh was regarded to be a popular mayor, which was reflected in opinion polling.

Walsh resigned as mayor on March 22, 2021, the same day that he was confirmed for his position in the Cabinet of Joe Biden. Kim Janey, president of the Boston City Council, became acting mayor upon Walsh's resignation.

=== Economy and fiscal matters ===
Walsh was seen as friendly towards real estate developers throughout his mayoralty, and Boston underwent a substantial building boom during his seven years in office. During the course of his mayoralty, officials in Boston granted approval to 7.7 million square feet of real estate developments, including more than 40,000 more housing units. Steve LeBlanc of The Associated Press wrote in 2021, "during his tenure as mayor, Walsh has overseen the city's ongoing rejuvenation, which has led to challenges that include gentrification and rising housing costs."

After Walsh left office, the editorial board of The Boston Globe would opine that, as mayor, Walsh, "kept Boston on an even keel financially and invited economic growth". Similarly, Bill Forry of the Dorchester Reporter wrote that, prior to the outbreak of the COVID-19 pandemic, Walsh's tenure was characterized by, "remarkable growth and relative peace and prosperity." During Walsh's tenure, Boston maintained a AAA bond credit rating.

In March 2015, Walsh supported City Councilor Michelle Wu's efforts to pass a paid parental leave ordinance. The ordinance was passed the following month, and provided city employees with six weeks of paid parental leave after childbirth, stillbirth, or adoption. Walsh signed the ordinance into law.

In January 2016, Boston struck a deal for General Electric to move their headquarters to the city. The city, together with the state government of Massachusetts, offered General Electric a combined $140 million in business incentives ($120 million in grants, and $25 million in city tax relief). Some critics argued that Boston had given General Electric a "sweetheart deal". However, The Boston Globe jointly named four deputies of Walsh and Governor Charlie Baker who had been involved in striking the deal as their "Bostonians of the Year" for their roles in the deal.

=== Policing ===
Soon after taking office, Walsh appointed William B. Evans the permanent commissioner of the Boston Police Department. In 2018, Walsh appointed William G. Gross as commissioner, making Gross the first African American individual to hold the position. In January 2021, upon Gross' retirement, Walsh made Dennis White, also African American, the new commissioner of the Boston Police Department. Days after appointing White, Walsh suspended him pending an investigation into allegations of domestic violence. Walsh is considered not to have properly vetted White before appointing him.

In June 2020, Walsh created the Boston Police Reform Taskforce. In October 2020, he pledged to adopt all of the final recommendations that the taskforce had made. In January 2021, he signed into law an ordinance that created a police accountability office, one of the recommendations the taskforce had made.

In 2014, Walsh signed the Boston Trust Act into law after it had been passed unanimously by the city council. The ordinance orders the Boston Police Department to not detain immigrants for potential deportation unless a criminal arrest warrant had been issued for them. This marked a shift away from the Secure Communities program the city up until then been a party to since 2006. Proponents of the Boston Trust Act argued that it would improve relations between immigrant communities and the local police, making immigrant communities more likely to report local crimes to police and to cooperate with police efforts. In January 2017, after newly-inaugurated president Donald Trump threatened to withdraw federal funding from cities that have sanctuary policies, Walsh reaffirmed that Boston would stand by its policy, declaring, "If people want to live here, they'll live here. They can use my office. They can use any office in this building."

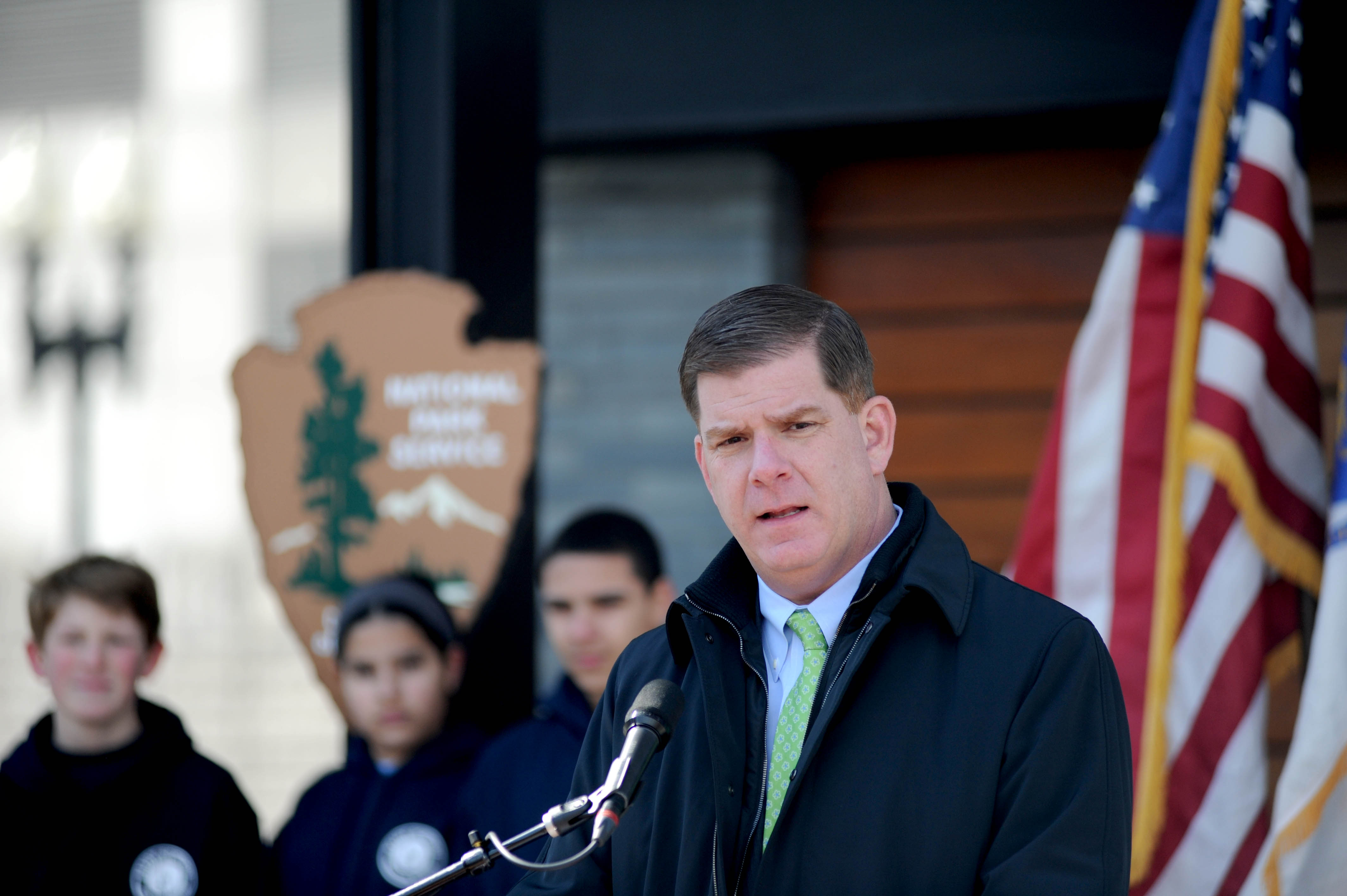
Walsh speaks in 2015

=== COVID-19 pandemic ===
Walsh was mayor during the first year of the COVID-19 pandemic. During the course of the pandemic, Walsh regularly updated the public using social media, robocalls, and text alerts. On March 14, 2020, Walsh declared a municipal state of emergency regarding the pandemic. Under Walsh, the city put in place restrictions aimed at stymieing the spread of the COVID-19 virus. Walsh urged Bostonians to adhere to social distancing guidelines, and made efforts to limit public activity. Days after declaring a state of emergency, he suspended all construction projects and closing all of the Boston Public Library locations and city community centers. In March, the City of Boston also closed all playgrounds at its parks. On April 5, 2020, Walsh issued an advisory that individuals leaving their place of residence to wear masks or other facial coverings. At the same time, he also announced an interim 9pm recommended curfew, and the interim closure of all recreation sports areas at city parks. In early April, a field hospital was erected at the Boston Convention and Exhibition Center.

On March 16, 2020, Walsh announced the Boston Resiliency Fund, a city-led fundraising effort to support programs and charities serving those impacted by the pandemic. Walsh established the Boston Rental Relief Fund in April 2020, using $3 million of city funds. The fund, using city dollars, would provide aid to those at risk of losing their rental residences amid the pandemic. He later added an additional $5 million in June 2020. At the end of Walsh's tenure, Jon Keller of WBZ-TV wrote that, "Walsh's calm, empathic leadership during the pandemic has drawn high marks from city residents." Bill Forry of the Dorchester Reporter opined that Walsh had been a, "sure and steady hand during a time of unprecedented crisis."

=== Other matters ===
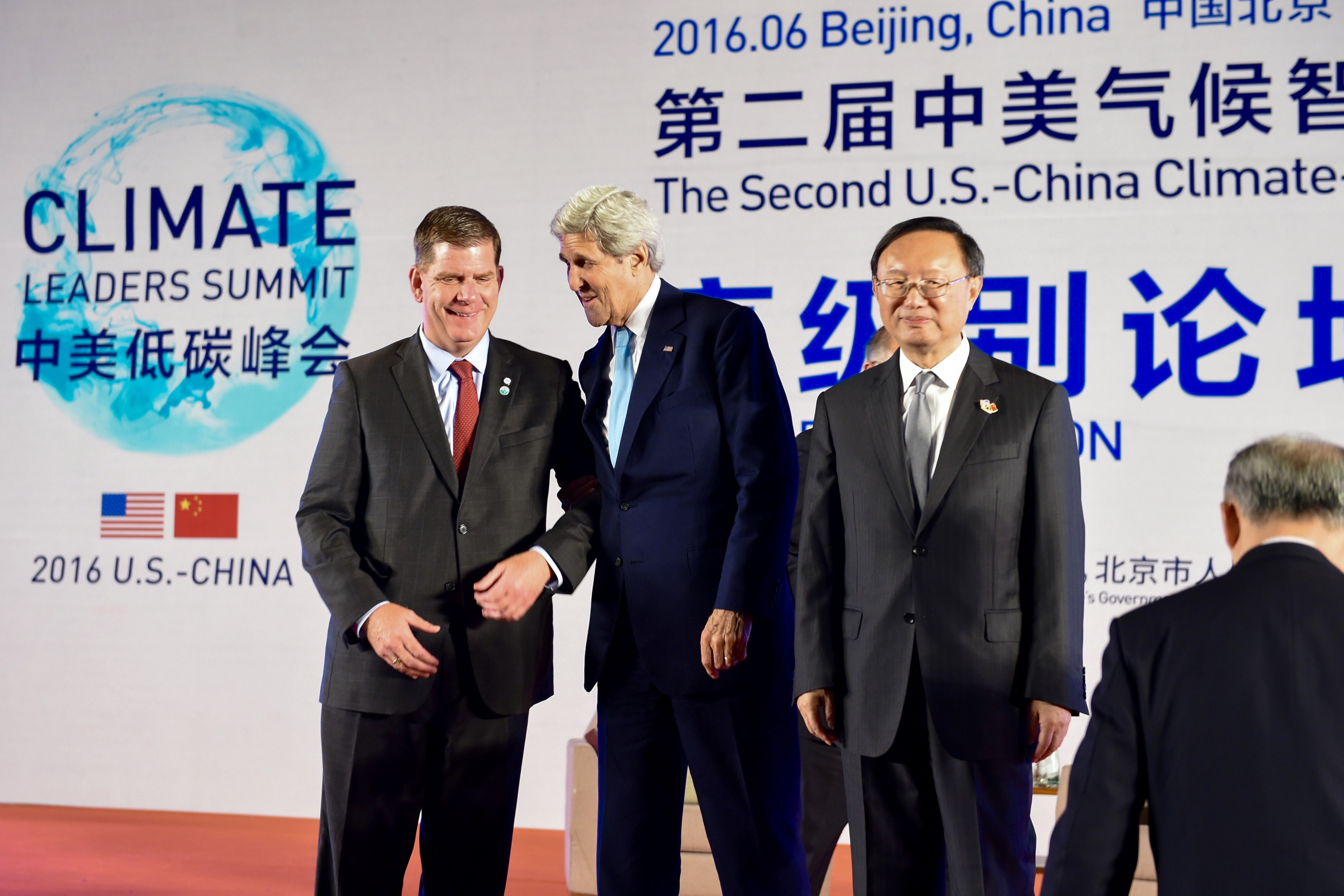
Walsh with United States Secretary of State John Kerry and Chinese State Councillor Yang Jiechi at the U.S.-China Climate-Smart Low-Carbon Cities Summit in Beijing

On October 8, 2014, Walsh, citing the advice of various City departments, agencies and leaders, and the Massachusetts Department of Transportation, ordered the closure of the Long Island Bridge due to disrepair and the evacuation of the programs for the homeless located on Long Island. Later that year, Walsh unveiled plans to renovate a facility to house hundreds of homeless people displaced due to the closure of the Long Island Bridge. A homelessness crisis emerged during Walsh's tenure at Mass and Cass. While Walsh, in 2019, outlined plans to deal with the homelessness crisis at this so-called Mass and Cass (also known as the "Methadone Mile"), it persisted to be a problem when he left office in 2021.

Boston was originally selected as the United States' bid city for the 2024 Summer Olympics. Walsh supported Boston bid for the 2024 Summer Olympics, regarding it as an opportunity to elevate Boston's international profile. In October 2014, Walsh had signed a letter stating that he would sign the Host City Contract without reservation; however, in July 2015, he stated that he was not comfortable signing the financial guarantee in its current form at that time. This was one of a number of events that led to the cancelation of Boston's bid for the Olympics on July 27, 2015. Boston's bid had run into opposition from residents.

In 2015, Walsh launched the Climate Ready Boston initiative to prepare Boston for the effects of climate change. Walsh also served in the leadership of C40 Cities Climate Leadership Group.

Walsh's handling of education has received criticism, being regarded as a significant shortcoming of his tenure as mayor. In Walsh's time as mayor, Boston cycled through several school superintendents, with there being two permanent and two interim superintendents serving during his mayoralty. Towards the end of 2014, Walsh proposed and negotiated a 40-minute extension to the school day of Boston Public Schools, which was implemented. A 2020 state audit of Boston Public Schools found the city to lack any, "clear, coherent, district-wide strategy for supporting low-performing schools."

Walsh supported an ordinance in the city council which regulated short-term rental of housing units. It passed in the City Council, and he signed it into law in June 2018. The ordinance restricted short-term rentals to owner-occupied housing units, required hosts to register with the city, and required the city to collect and publish data on short-term rentals. Airbnb sued the city over the ordinance; the suit was settled in August 2019 with an agreement which included having Airbnb hosts in Boston enter their ordinance-required city-issued registration number into the website, or face having their listings removed from the website.

In June 2020, Walsh declared racism to be a public health crisis. That month, in an effort to address institutional racism, Walsh announced he would create an "equity and inclusion cabinet" in his administration, launch a racial equity fund, and declared his intent to pursue a new zoning amendment aimed at addressing the issue of resident displacement. The racial equity fund launched months later, with Walsh stating it would invest in nonprofits that, "empower Black and brown residents in economic development, in public health, in youth employment, in education, in the arts, and other areas."

== Secretary of Labor (2021–2023) ==
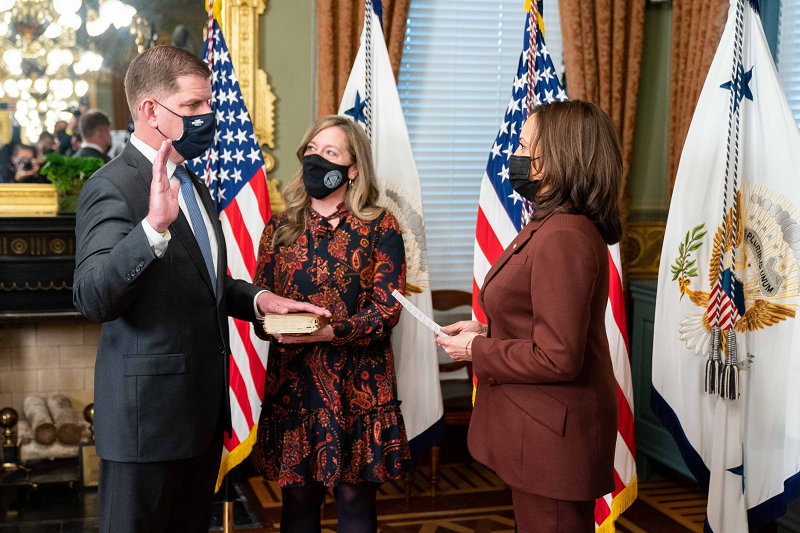
Walsh is sworn in as the new Secretary of the Department of Labor by Vice President Kamala Harris in March 2021, with his hand on a Bible being held by his longtime partner, Lorrie Higgins

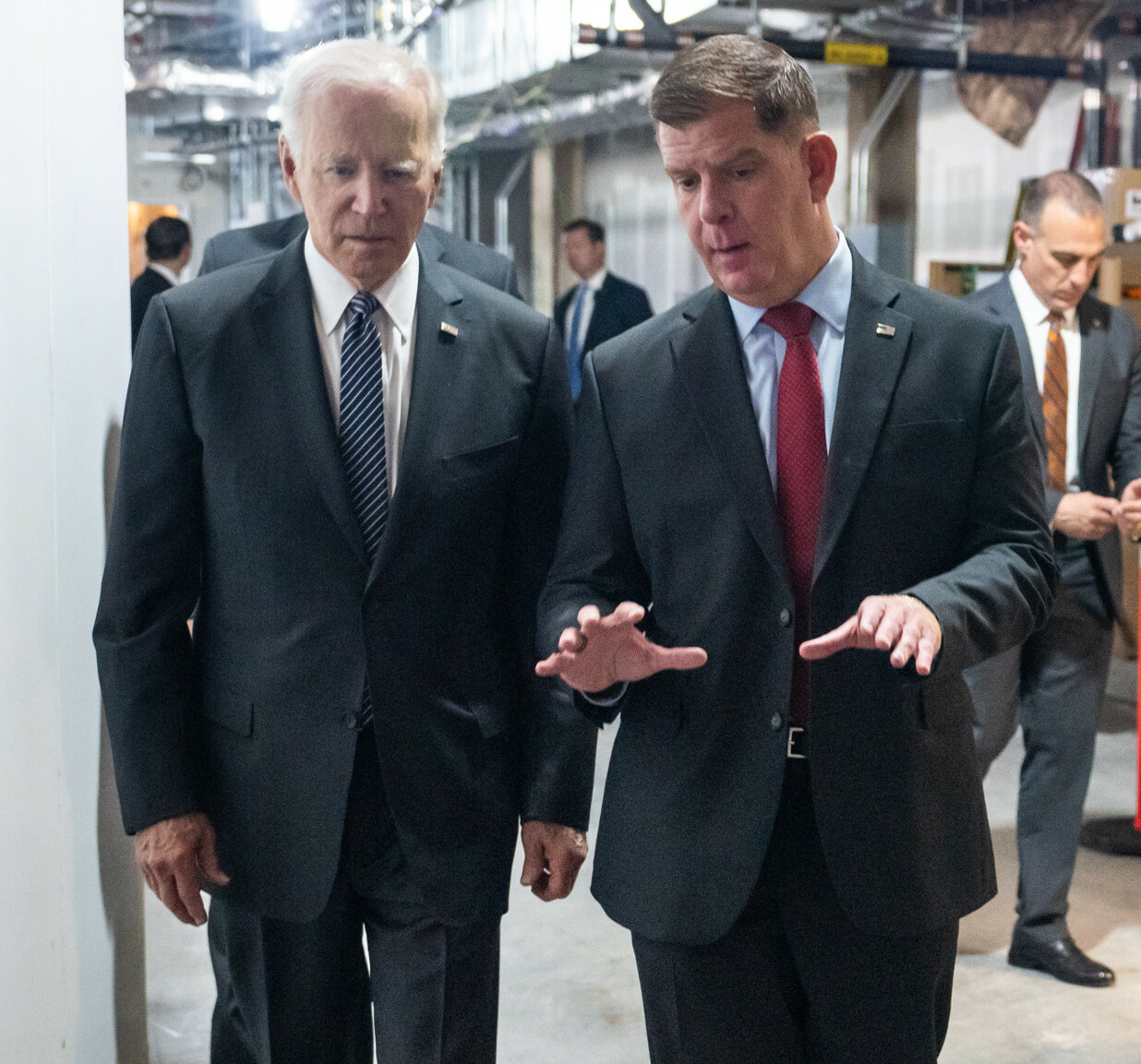
President Biden and Walsh in September 2022

On January 7, 2021, Walsh was announced by President-elect Joe Biden to be his designated nominee for secretary of labor. On February 11, 2021, the United States Senate Committee on Health, Education, Labor and Pensions voted to move Walsh's confirmation forward to a full Senate vote. The nomination was confirmed by the United States Senate on March 22, 2021, by a vote of 68–29. He was the final department secretary of Biden's Cabinet to be confirmed. The day after being confirmed, he was sworn in by Vice President Kamala Harris.

Walsh was the first Cabinet secretary to openly be in a twelve-step program for recovery from addiction. As secretary, amid a national rise in addiction, Walsh discussed his own experience with alcoholism, and participated in addiction-related events. Walsh was also the first former union leader to serve in the position in roughly 45 years, since the tenure of William Usery Jr.

While secretary, Walsh considered running in the 2022 Massachusetts gubernatorial election after Governor Baker announced his retirement, but he ultimately opted against doing so. Walsh later tendered his resignation from the Department of Labor effective March 11, 2023 in order to serve as the executive director of the players' union of the National Hockey League.

=== Expectations and reception of tenure ===
Walsh entered with high expectations from many unionists. This was driven both by his own working-class unionist background, and by the fact that Biden had made supporting unions a high priority in his agenda. Towards the start of Walsh's tenure, Steve Tolman (president of the Massachusetts AFL-CIO) told The Boston Globe that he believed that Biden had an opportunity to be the most pro-labor president ever, and Walsh had opportunity to be the most effective labor secretary ever.

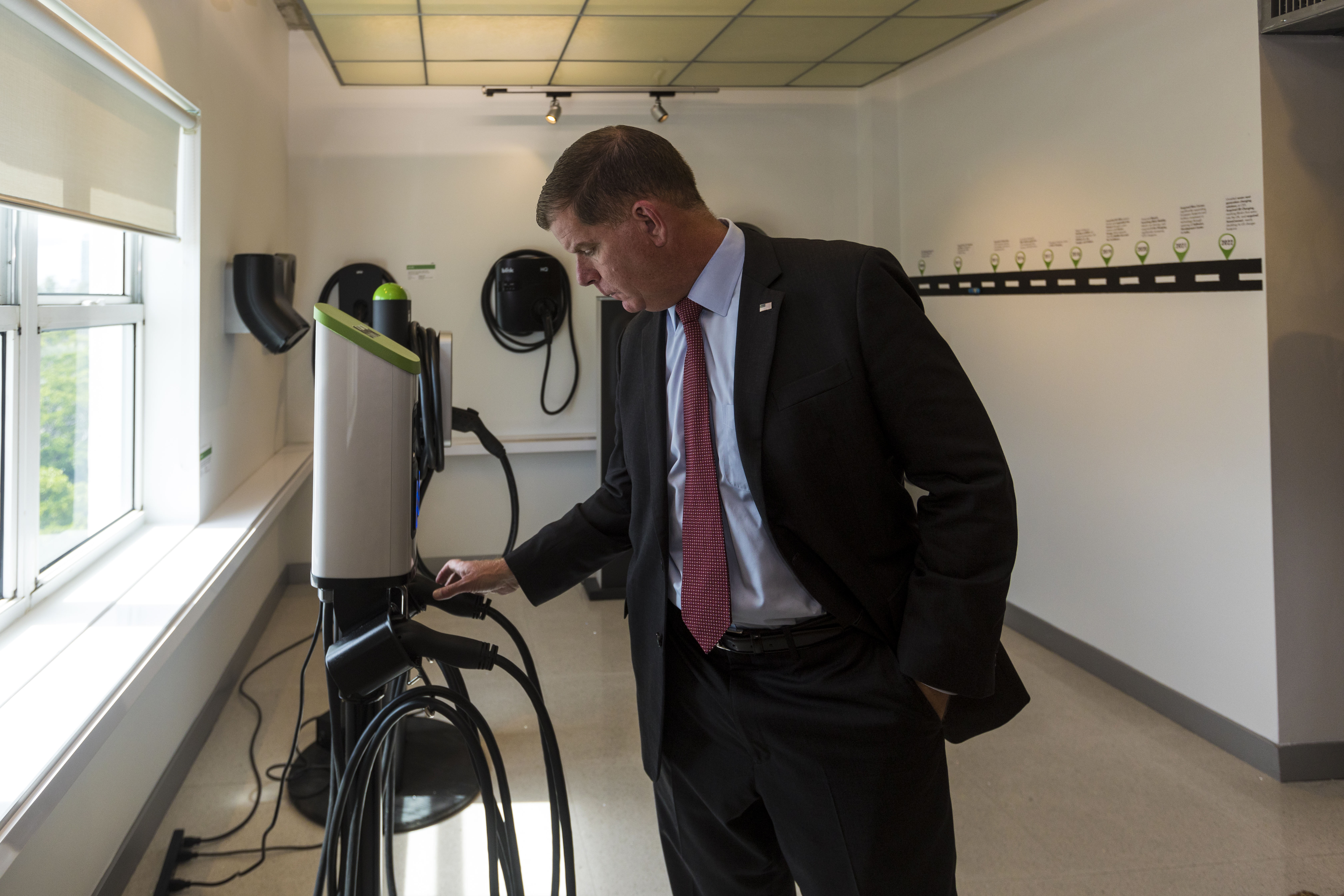
Walsh looks at electric vehicle charging equipment while touring Blink Charging's headquarters in October 2022

While secretary, Walsh received some criticism for spending a substantial amount of time in office away from Washington, D.C., where the United States Department of Labor is headquartered, and instead in Boston.

In an opinion piece published by MSNBC at the end of Walsh's tenure, Hamilton Nolan credited Walsh with shepherding a number "beneficial but not transformative" regulations which benefited the bargaining position of workers, including federal contractors and independent contractors. However, he argued that Walsh disappointed the expectations that unionists had for his tenure, citing shortcomings of his tenure as well as direct actions such as his support of Biden's decision to allow congressional intervention in order to resolve the 2022 United States railroad labor dispute. Kim Kelly of Fast Company called Walsh's tenure "tumultuous". Commenting that Walsh's union credentials had given union members high hopes at the start of Walsh's tenure, Kelly wrote, "as his short tenure comes to an end, it's hard to say how well the former Boston mayor lived up to those expectations." In a September 2022 piece for The New Republic, Timothy Noah called Walsh's tenure "surprisingly disappointing," writing that Walsh, "hasn't gotten all that much done at the Labor Department." Noah partially faulted what he saw as a lack of progress on key projects by the Department of Labor during Walsh's tenure on the failure of the Biden Administration, by that time, to fill the positions of secretary for the Employee Benefits Security Administration and assistant secretary for the Wage and Hour Division with senate-confirmed appointees.

=== Trade unions ===
Ben Penn of Bloomberg Law reported that, as labor secretary, Walsh lobbied trade unions not to criticize the prospective appointment of David Weil, which helped to clear the path for Biden to nominate Weil to serve as the administrator of the Wage and Hour Division without vocal union opposition.

In October 2021, Walsh and Vice President Kamala Harris announced new guidelines aimed at encouraging more federal workers to join trade unions, with the objective of boosting the collective bargaining powers of American trade unions. Also in October 2021, Walsh became the first labor secretary to visit a picket line and stand with the strikers when he visited the 2021 Kellogg's strike.

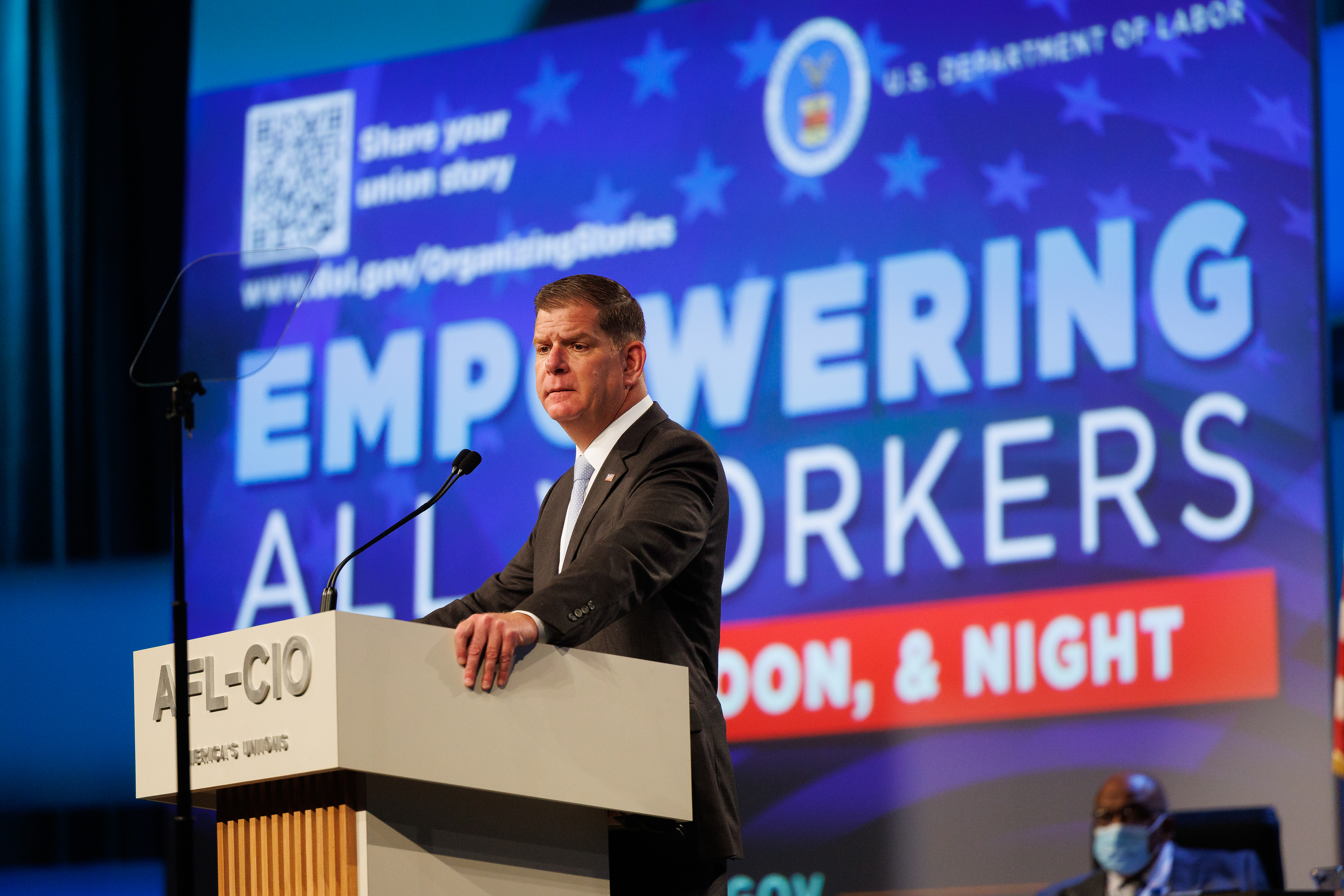
Walsh speaking at the 2022 AFL–CIO Constitutional Convention

Walsh mediated a December 2021 resolution between the Massachusetts Nurses Association and Tenet Healthcare to end a nine-month strike at Saint Vincent Hospital in Worcester, Massachusetts that involved 700 striking nurses. Walsh also played a role in mediating the resolution to the 2021–22 Major League Baseball lockout. Walsh was involved in efforts to avert a strike in the 2022 United States railroad labor dispute. Walsh negotiated a tentative agreement to avert a rail strike. However, the agreement failed after members of several unions voted to reject the agreement over lack of guarantees relating to demands such as time off and paid sick days. Ultimately, to avoid a strike that would have a major impact on the United States economy, the Biden administration and Congress passed a bill which forced the agreement on all the party unions, including those whose membership had voted to reject the agreement.

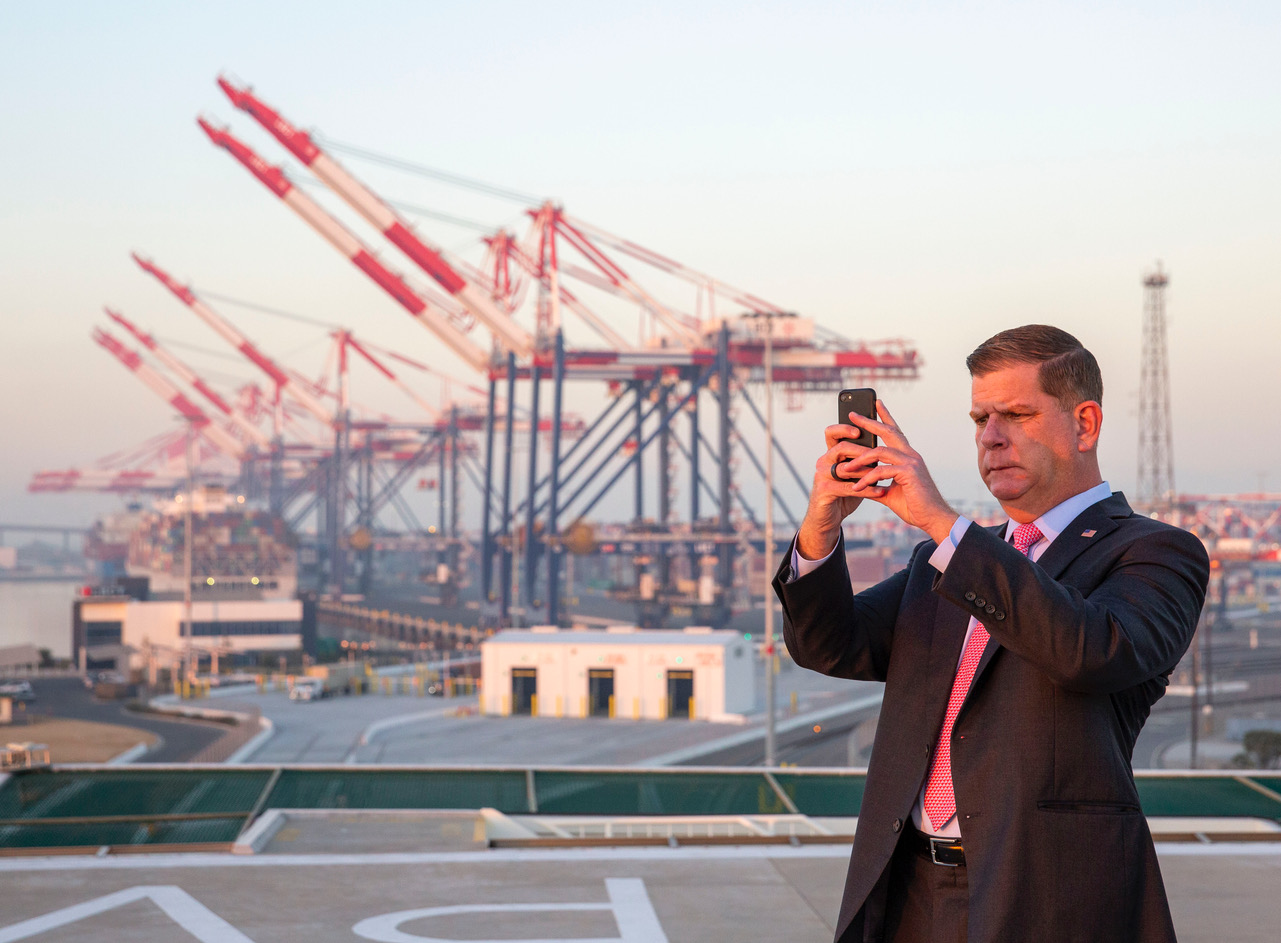
Walsh visits the Port of Long Beach in November 2021

=== Changes to rules and standards ===
While Walsh was secretary, the Department of Labor finalized new rules on healthcare and retirement fund management. This included reversing a Trump administration rule that prohibited retirement fund managers from considering environmental, social, and corporate governance factors when reaching decisions in regards to investment. The department also finalized its rule on how to implement provisions restricting surprise billing in health insurance. The department also explored creating new policy that would provide access to contraception to employees whose companies deny them insurance for it. Maegan Vazquez and Matt Stiles of CNN described Walsh as having been, "a key member of Biden's economic team." Walsh was the designated survivor during the 2023 State of the Union Address. Numerous rule changes by the Trump administration-era were reversed under Walsh. This including reinstating a rule that prohibits employers from paying workers who spend more than 20% of their time performing functions in which they don't interact with consumers the lower "tipped" hourly minimum wage of $2.13 as opposed to standard hourly minimum wage of $7.25. This rule had previously been in effect from the 1980s until the Trump administration removed it. In reinstating the rule, further protections were added for tipped workers beyond what the earlier policy had enforced.

During Walsh's tenure, the Department of Labor enforced a temporary standards meant to protect workers from COVID-19. The policy was strongly advocated for by Walsh, but the Biden Administration delayed its rollout beyond its original mid-March 2021 target date. In June 2021, the first portion of the standard arose, encouraging healthcare workers to receive the COVID-19 vaccine, but not requiring such vaccination. In September 2021, Biden signed the Executive Order on Ensuring Adequate COVID Safety Protocols for Federal Contractors (EO 14042), which required large employers to have their employees either be vaccinated or receive weekly COVID testing. However, in a January 2022 per curiam decision, Biden v. Missouri, the Supreme Court of the United States blocked this policy.

== Executive Director of the NHLPA (2023–present) ==
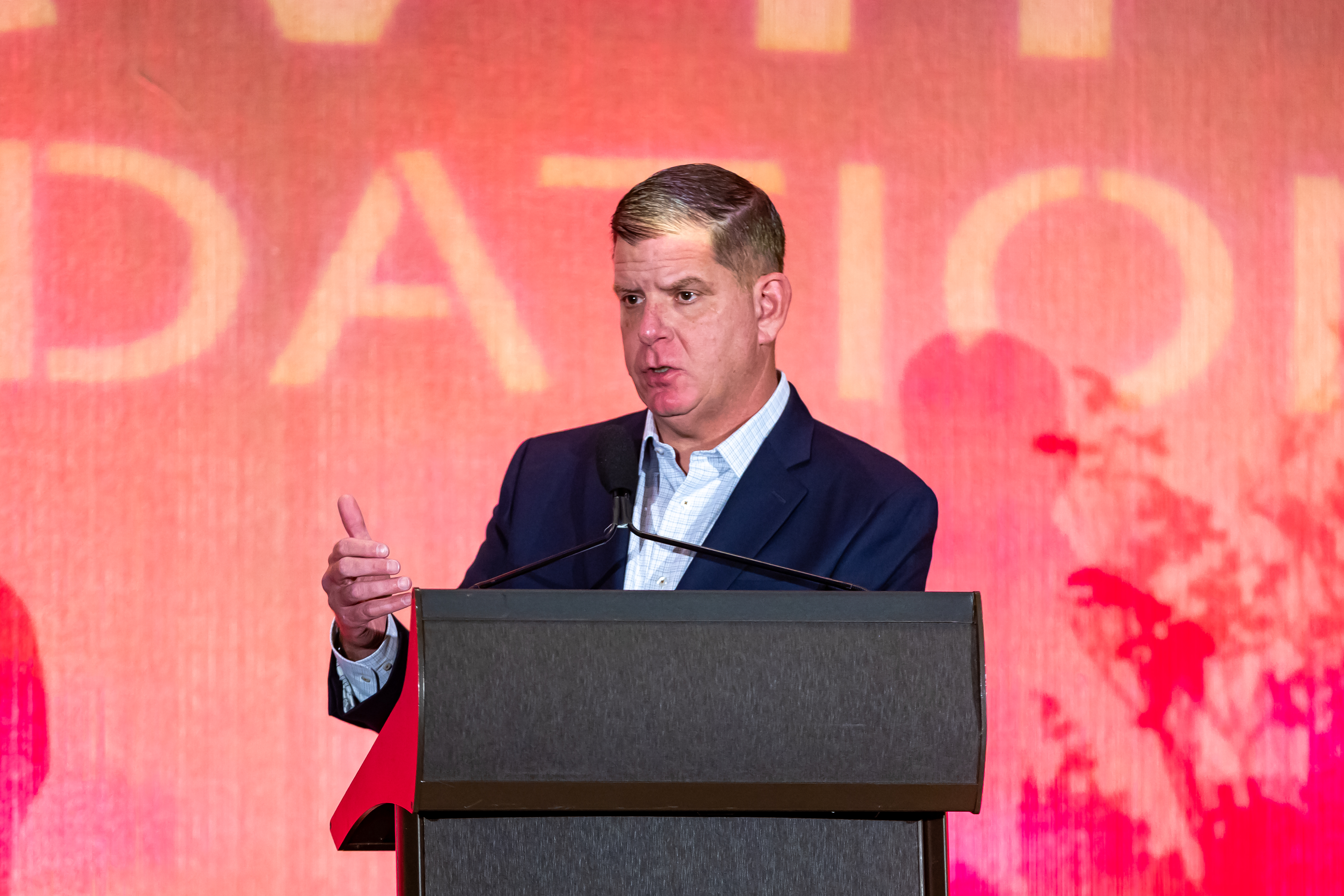
Walsh speaking in 2025

On February 7, 2023, it was reported that Walsh would leave the Cabinet to become head of the National Hockey League Players' Association (NHLPA), the National Hockey League (NHL)'s players' union. He was formally confirmed unanimously by the NHLPA's board of directors to hold that role on February 16, 2023, and the Department of Labor announced that he would leave office as secretary of labor and take office as executive director of the NHLPA in mid-March. Walsh is reported to earn a $3 million annual salary in the position. This is a significant increase over the $220,000 he was paid annually as secretary of labor.

In October 2023, The Athletic wrote, "in his introductory news conference in late March, Walsh vowed to bring a 'different' style of leadership, and it feels like Walsh is going with a more personal approach," observing that Walsh was making an effort to meet directly with all of the league's players, was holding phone calls with many players, and was giving players his personal cell phone number.

=== Collective bargaining agreement ===
On June 27, 2025, it was announced that the NHLPA and the NHL had agreed to terms for a collective bargaining agreement (CBA) that will be in effect from late 2026 until late 2030. The agreement's four-term duration is much shorter than past agreements, something Walsh has stated he deliberately sought. Walsh believes that it was unideal that the longer length of past CBAs had led to many players spending the entirety of their NHL careers playing under the conditions of a single CBA that had been negotiated before they became an NHL player.

When the CBA negotiated with Walsh at the helm of the NHLPA takes effect for the 2026–27 NHL season, the NHL will downsize its preseason and will expand its regular season from 82 games to 84. In order to downsize the preseason, teams will be limited to four preseason exhibition games. During the 2024–25 NHL season, pre-seasons had averaged 6.5 exhibition games per team, with five teams playing eight exhibition games during their pre-seasons. Additionally, veteran players will now be limited to appearing in only two exhibitions games per preseason. An 84-game regular season is not unprecedented in the NHL, with the NHL twice having had 84-game regular seasons (in 1992–93 and 1993–94).

The new CBA institutes a "playoff salary cap" to close a salary cap loophole in which teams that had clinched their playoff berths before the trade deadline would sometimes place high-salaried players on longterm injury reserve during the later portion of their regular season (activating said players during the playoffs), which would to generate salary cap space with which they could acquire additional players prior to the trade deadline.

The new CBA also raises the league's minimum salary from $775,00 to $1 million. It also retains ad condition present in the previous two CBAs in which the owners and players split league revenue 50–50. Due to league executives not enjoying the optics of teams occasionally needing to have amateur and retired goaltenders (such as David Ayres and Scott Foster) play single games as "emergency backup goaltenders" (EBUGs), the league will now permit teams to travel with a third-string goaltender.

=== Stance on themed jersey controversies ===
Soon after taking office, commenting on the resistance of some players to wearing LGBTQ pride-themed warmup jerseys, Walsh remarked,

At the end of the day, it's up to the individual about what they want to do. If a player doesn't want to wear a jersey in warm-up, they shouldn't be forced to. I think that's something that's important. But again, I think a lot of it is conversation, as well, and education.

Walsh has disagreed with characterizations that players had opposed wearing jerseys on anti-LGBTQ grounds, and has instead characterized the motivations of those players as having been, "religious beliefs or political back home beliefs". The league adopted a policy which prohibits such pride-themed jerseys from being worn. After this new policy was adopted, Walsh stated that he expected all teams would still continue to hold Pride Nights without warmup jerseys, commenting,

Wearing the jerseys is one aspect to Pride night, but most of the Pride festivities happen in or around the arena. It's unfortunate, it being a controversial issue as far as wearing the jerseys.

=== Stance on the Arizona Coyotes arena situation ===
Walsh made resolving the Arizona Coyotes arena situation a significant priority for himself. Walsh was critical of the Coyotes playing with Mullett Arena (a 5,000-seat college hockey arena) as their temporary home arena, lacking any definite plans for a new permanent venue. He opined in February 2024 that the team should be relocated to a new market if the situation cannot be quickly remedied. One concern was that the Coyotes' arena situation was decreasing the team's revenue due to its limited seating capacity and lack in luxury seating options. With the team experiencing the league's worst financial losses, it was of concern that the arena situation was a drag the amount that players received from their revenue-sharing agreement with the league.

Walsh's public comments on the situation heightened pressure for action by the league. By the end of the 2023–24 NHL season, plans had been formalized to render the Coyotes inactive and transfer their assets to a new expansion team in Salt Lake City (effectively moving the team to that location), with there being a possibility that the Coyotes can be reactivated as an additional team in the league at some point in the next five years if an arena is secured for them.

=== Other NHL matters ===
In September 2023, Paul Bissonnette made claims on his hockey podcast Spittin' Chiclets alleging that he had been informed by a whistleblower that Columbus Blue Jackets head coach Mike Babcock was demanding to see photographs stored on the private phones of the team's players. Soon after, Walsh held meetings with Columbus Blue Jackets players executives in order to look into the allegations. He then met with team and league executives. Within days of the assertions having been publicized by Bissonnette, Babcock resigned from his coaching position.

Walsh was supportive of the NHL and NHLPA reaching an agreement with the IOC and IIHF to allow NHL players to compete in the 2026 Winter Olympics. An agreement was reached by the parties in February 2024 to allow players to compete in both the 2026 and 2030 Winter Olympics

In late July 2025, after the criminal trial of five hockey players charged for the sexual assault and rape allegations at the center of the Hockey Canada sexual assault scandal resulted in acquittals for all criminal defendants, the NHLPA released a statement disagreeing with the league's decision not to immediately welcome involved players' return. The NHL had stated that the eligibility of the players would pending the league's own analysis of the allegations and review of the trial judge's findings, noting that behavior can fall short of criminal while still being "disturbing [and] unacceptable". In response to this, the NHLPA released a statement opposing any hold on the players' eligibility and arguing that such an approach by the NHL would violate the CBA it had with the union,

[The tried players] (Note: Dillon Dube, Cal Foote, Alex Formenton, Carter Hart, and Michael McLeod) were acquitted of all charges by Justice Carroccia of the Ontario Superior Court. After missing more than a full season of their respective NHL careers, they should now have the opportunity to return to work. The NHL’s declaration that the Players are 'ineligible' to play pending its further analysis of the Court’s findings is inconsistent with the discipline procedures set forth in the CBA.

=== Involvement in politics during tenure ===
In 2023, Walsh began to increase his public profile in Boston. Adam Reilly of WGBH observed in August 2023, "after keeping a relatively low profile locally during his time as President Biden's labor secretary, former Mayor Marty Walsh has been raising his profile in Boston over the past few months with a series of notable public appearances." After having had his political activities limited by the Hatch Act while secretary of labor, he began again involving himself in Boston politics after leaving the office. He made his first political endorsements since leaving office as mayor by endorsing two candidates in the 2023 Boston City Council election.

In March 2024, Walsh clarified that he had no present intention of making a full-time return to politics, declaring, "my job is at the NHLPA. I did politics for 25 years, I’ve moved on to the next phase of my life. I have no future political aspirations – and maybe not ever."

After President Biden withdrew from the 2024 presidential election and Vice President Harris took his place as the presumptive Democratic Party nominee for president, Walsh was a member of a team of advisors that aided Harris in her selection of a running-mate. Harris selected Minnesota governor Tim Walz. Walsh had become acquaintances with Harris during her time as a U.S. senator, and was reported by The New York Times to have been one of her most trusted advisors at the time of her presidential campaigns.

=== 2024 nomination to serve as a governor of the United States Postal Service ===
On February 29, 2024, President Biden nominated Walsh to serve as a governor of the United States Postal Service. Walsh was nominated to the seat left vacant by the departure of Lee Moak, for a term that would have expired on December 8, 2029. The nomination came at a time when Biden was receiving pressure from members of the House Democratic Caucus to fill open seats on the board due to concerns regarding slow delivery of mail.

Walsh declared that he did not intend to resign his players union leadership position if confirmed, noting that the duties postal service board membership are not a full-time job. Walsh clarified, "I'm very committed to the players, I love my job at the NHLPA. My job is at the NHLPA." Walsh further remarked, "It's not unfamiliar for a person in a labor union position to serve on a board, President Biden knows what I bring working for people and drawing on that labor experience."

On June 13, Republican senators JD Vance, Bill Hagerty, Mike Lee, Roger Marshall, Eric Schmitt, and Tommy Tuberville pledged to slow the confirmation of Walsh and a number of other pending Biden nominees for federal office and judgeships as a form of protest over the conviction of Donald Trump in New York State criminal court. On November 14 (as a lame-duck president following the 2024 election), Biden withdrew the nomination from Senate consideration without providing an immediate explanation.

== Personal life ==
Unwed during his mayoralty, Walsh was the first bachelor elected mayor of Boston in more than six decades. When he took office, his girlfriend Lorrie Higgins was dubbed the city's "first girlfriend" by The Boston Globe. After many years as unwed partners, in March 2024 Walsh and Higgins were married. They were wed by a local justice of peace on a trip in the Caribbean. The two first met each other when Walsh was a state representative and Higgins was working as an aide to his state house colleague Eugene O'Flaherty. Even prior to marrying Higgins, Walsh had considered himself to have a de facto grandfather role in relation to her grandchild.

Walsh and Higgins reside in the Lower Mills neighborhood of Dorchester. They have resided there since 2015. Despite the NHLPA being headquartered in Toronto, Canada, of 2023, Walsh was described as staying "firmly rooted in Boston." Even while serving as secretary of labor, Walsh spent a large portion of his time in Boston. Walsh had never established a residence in Washington, D.C. during his tenure as secretary of labor, instead opting to stay in hotels while in Washington, D.C. over the work week and returning to his Dorchester residence for weekends.

Walsh has been a season ticket holder of the NFL's New England Patriots since franchise owner Robert Kraft bought the team in 1994.

Walsh is a Roman Catholic. He speaks Irish and holds both American and Irish citizenship.

=== Alcoholism and recovery ===
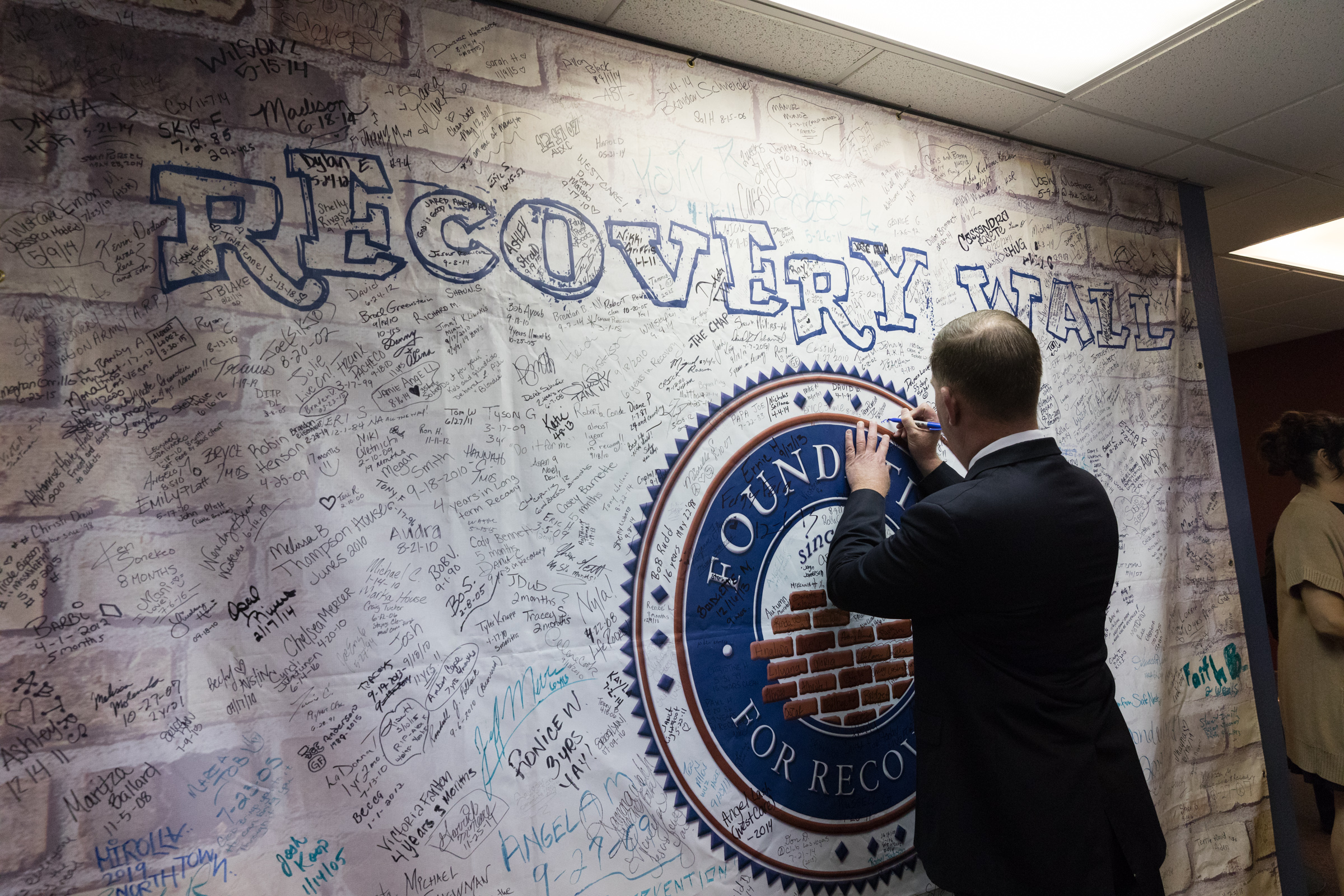
Walsh, who has battled alcoholism, signs the "Recovery Wall" at the Foundation for Recovery during an official visit as Secretary of Labor in June 2021

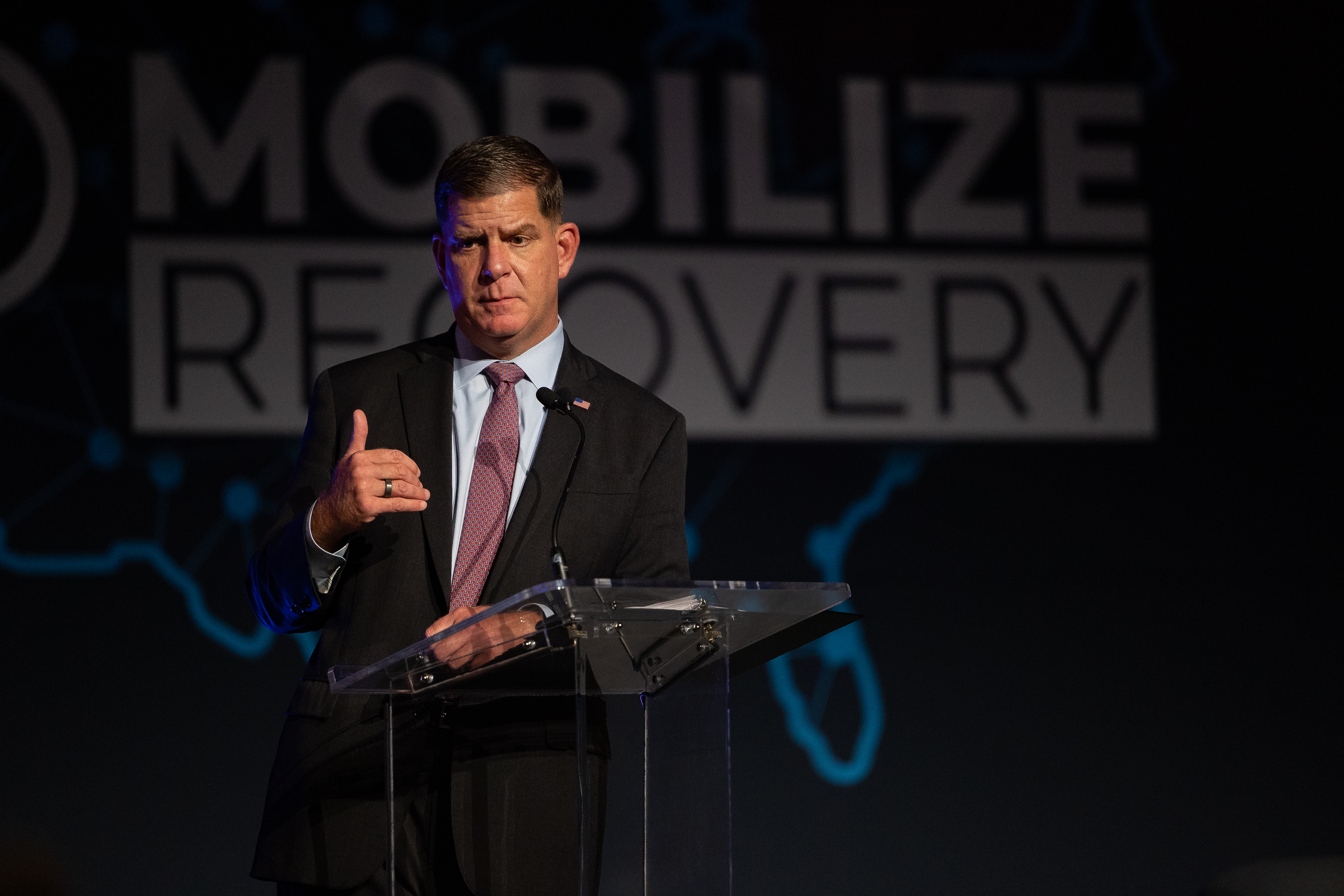
Walsh speaks about addiction recovery at the September 2021 Mobilize Recovery Conference in his official capacity as Secretary of Labor

Walsh is a recovering alcoholic. By the time he ran for mayor in 2013, he was eighteen years sober in a twelve-step program. Walsh has recounted that his experience with alcohol began when he started drinking beer as a teenager because he, "liked the taste." He has further recounted that he sought help for his alcoholism by entering a detox program sometime after hitting "rock bottom" in April 1995 when he was asked to leave a Boston Bruins ice hockey match due to his excessive drunkenness. Walsh also attended Alcoholics Anonymous meetings in order to facilitate his recovery. This is something Walsh had continued. During his tenure as secretary of labor, Walsh continued to attend meetings at his local Alcoholics Anonymous chapter. In his speech to the 2016 Democratic National Convention, Walsh spoke about his alcoholism. He opened the speech with the words, "My name is Marty Walsh, and I'm an alcoholic" (using the format which Alcoholics Anonymous participants use to introduce themselves at meetings).

Walsh's experience with addiction was a component of the life story of him overcoming adversity which he told as a portion of his stump pitch to voters during the 2013 mayoral election. This aspect of his life story has been credited with helping Walsh to set himself apart as a candidate.

Being the first Cabinet secretary to openly be in a twelve-step program for recovery from addiction, Walsh represented the Biden administration at a number of addiction recovery-related events during his time as secretary of labor.

=== Honorary degrees ===
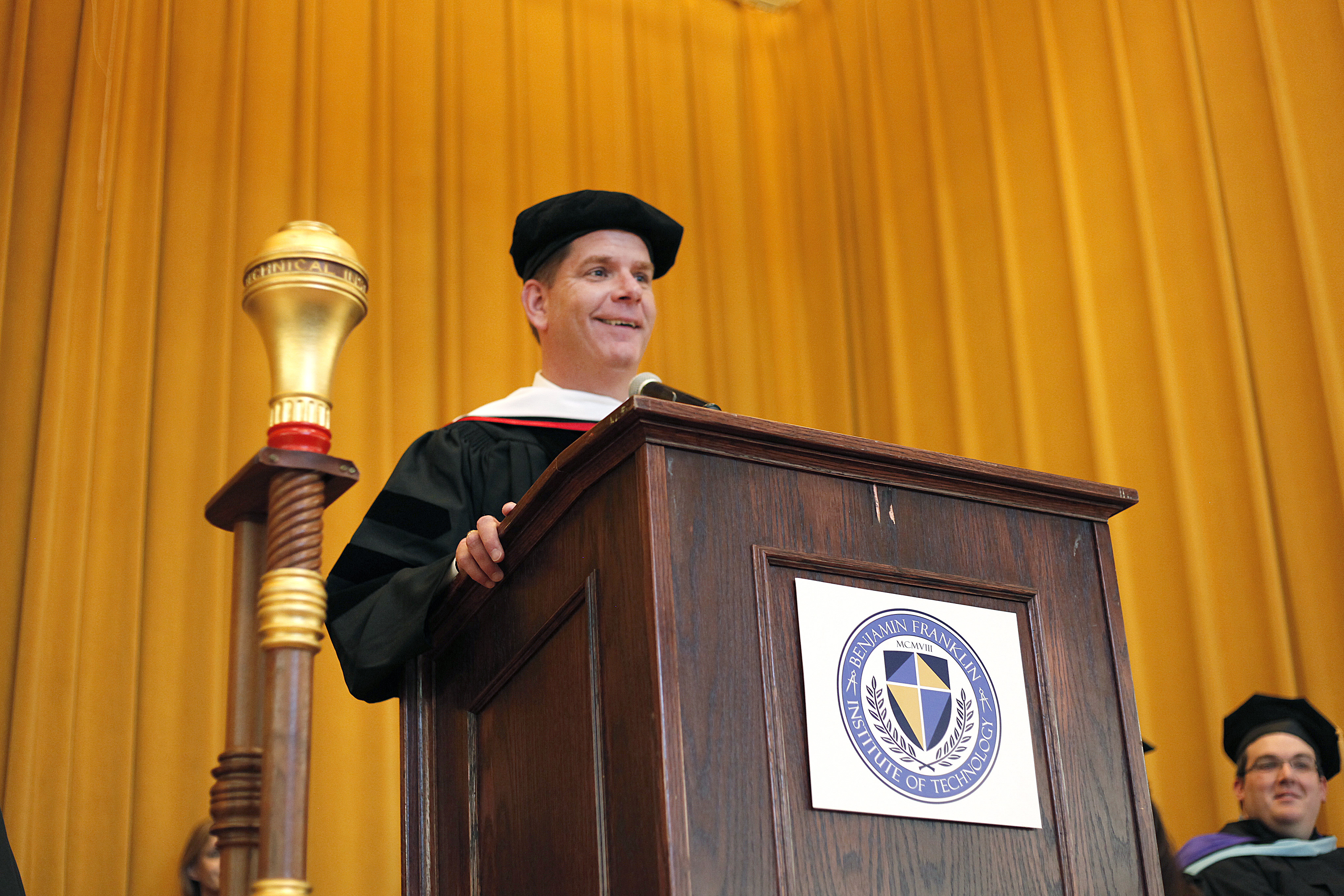
Walsh delivering the 2014 commencement address at the Benjamin Franklin Cummings Institute of Technology

After he delivered the college's 2014 commencement address, Walsh was presented with an honorary degree by the Benjamin Franklin Cummings Institute of Technology for his "commitment to civic responsibility, access to quality education, and workforce development". This was Walsh's first honorary degree. After he delivered the university's 2018 commencement address, the Wentworth Institute of Technology awarded Walsh an honorary doctorate of engineering from its technical school. After he delivered the commencement speech at Bridgewater State University's 2019 undergraduate graduation ceremony, Walsh was awarded an honorary degree. After he delivered the college's 2022 commencement address, Endicott College awarded Walsh an honorary doctorate in law. After Walsh delivered its 2023 commencement address, Suffolk University (which Walsh had previously attended before dropping-out after a single semester) awarded Walsh an honorary doctorate of public service. That same year, after Walsh delivered the university's commencement address, Walsh was awarded an honorary degree by the Massachusetts Maritime Academy. Additionally, at its 2023 commencement ceremony, Dean College awarded Walsh an honorary Doctor of Public Service.

== Political ideology and stances ==
In November 2020, Robert Kuttner of The American Prospect described Walsh as being a "working-class progressive". In 2017, Larry Donnelly of Irish Central described Walsh's ideology as "undeniably left of center", while noting that Walsh both managed to appeal to left-wing activist and a share of the city's more conservative voters who had supported Donald Trump in the 2016 presidential election. In March 2021, Kevin Cullen of The Boston Globe opined that Maurice J. Tobin and Martin Patrick Durkin were the former United States secretaries of labor whose personal backgrounds and ideologies most overlapped with Walsh's own. In January 2021, The Hill opinion contributor John Logan noted,

[While] the building trades [from which Walsh hails] have traditionally been viewed as the most conservative bloc within the labor movement,...[and] Walsh understands the culture of the building trades,...[Walsh] is significantly more progressive than many former building trades officials...[As mayor, Walsh] has supported many progressive causes, such as greater police accountability, declaring racism a public health issue, tackling wage theft, championing workplace safety in the construction industry, using city contracts to promote diversity, and pushing parental leave for city employees.

Walsh has also been described as having been elected mayor in 2013 and 2017 on a more moderate platform than his successor Michelle Wu was elected on in 2021. Wu has been described as being positioned to Walsh's left, including on issues such as climate change, economic equity, and racial equity. David Bernstein of Boston magazine observed in July 2023, that Wu's mayoral agenda's focus on reform was, "implicitly—and sometimes openly—a repudiation of Walsh’s [mayoral] tenure."

As both a state legislator and as mayor, Walsh supported more-compassionate policies in regards to handling undocumented immigrants. In both offices, he also opposed the legalization of recreational cannabis in Massachusetts. Additionally, Walsh aligned himself in support of LGBTQ+ causes, including supporting same-sex marriage. In 2017, Walsh criticized President Trump's executive order imposing a moratorium on military service by transgender individuals, calling it "shameful" and "un-American". In March 2017, Walsh remarked of his administration's approach in regards to transgender people,

We are listening to our transgender community by making the city more inclusive. Its important for us to every now and then send a message, to let people know we will not be intimidated by discrimination or harassment. When you deny the experience of transgender individuals, you are denying the experience of basic human civil rights - in Boston and Massachusetts we are better than that. Together we are going to continue to fight intolerance with love and acceptance.

In mid-2025, Walsh expressed concern that the Democratic Party and its messaging had fallen out-of-touch with the sentiments of the American working class.

== Electoral history ==
=== Massachusetts House of Representatives ===
1996 Massachusetts House of Representatives 13th Suffolk district general election
Party	Candidate	Votes	%
Democratic	James T. Brett	4,145	48.04
Write-in	Marty Walsh	1,953	22.63
Write-in	Charles Tevnan	492	9.82
Write-in	Others	2,039	23.63
Total votes		8,629	100

1997 13th Suffolk District state representative special election
Primary election
Party	Candidate	Votes	%
Democratic	Marty Walsh	2,085	32.76
Democratic	James W. Hunt III	1,839	28.89
Democratic	Charles R. Tevnan	1,039	16.32
Democratic	Martha Coakley	746	11.72
Democratic	Edward M. Regal	612	9.62
Democratic	Charles P. Burke	42	0.66
Write-in		2	0.03
Total votes		6,365	100
General election
Democratic	Marty Walsh	842	98.83
Write-in		10	1.17
Total votes		852	100

1998 13th Suffolk District state representative election
Primary election
Party	Candidate	Votes	%
Democratic	Marty Walsh (incumbent)	4,184	100.00
Total votes		4,184	100
General election
Democratic	Marty Walsh (incumbent)	6,282	100.00
Total votes		6,282	100

2000 13th Suffolk District state representative election
Primary election
Party	Candidate	Votes	%
Democratic	Marty Walsh (incumbent)	1,023	100.00
Total votes		1,023	100
General election
Democratic	Marty Walsh (incumbent)	8,113	100.00
Total votes		8,113	100

2002 13th Suffolk District state representative election
Primary election
Party	Candidate	Votes	%
Democratic	Marty Walsh (incumbent)	3,760	80.67
Democratic	Edward L. Geary, Jr.	901	19.33
Total votes		4,661	100
General election
Democratic	Marty Walsh (incumbent)	6,756	100.00
Total votes		6,756	100

2004 13th Suffolk District state representative election
Primary election
Party	Candidate	Votes	%
Democratic	Marty Walsh (incumbent)	2,826	98.36
Write-in		47	1.64
Total votes		2,873	100
General election
Democratic	Marty Walsh (incumbent)	9,532	88.51
Republican	John P. O'Gorman	1,196	11.10
Write-in		42	0.39
Total votes		10,770	100

2006 13th Suffolk District state representative election
Primary election
Party	Candidate	Votes	%
Democratic	Marty Walsh (incumbent)	4,041	98.97
Write-in		42	1.03
Total votes		4,083	100
General election
Democratic	Marty Walsh (incumbent)	7,624	98.56
Write-in		111	1.44
Total votes		7,735	100

2008 13th Suffolk District state representative election
Primary election
Party	Candidate	Votes	%
Democratic	Marty Walsh (incumbent)	2,120	99.02
Write-in		21	0.98
Total votes		2,141	100
General election
Democratic	Marty Walsh (incumbent)	10,678	98.64
Write-in		147	1.36
Total votes		10,825	100

2010 13th Suffolk District state representative election
Primary election
Party	Candidate	Votes	%
Democratic	Marty Walsh (incumbent)	2,257	98.73
Write-in		29	1.27
Total votes		2,286	100
General election
Democratic	Marty Walsh (incumbent)	7,903	98.21
Write-in		144	1.79
Total votes		8,047	100

2012 13th Suffolk District state representative election
Primary election
Party	Candidate	Votes	%
Democratic	Marty Walsh (incumbent)	2,058	98.56
Write-in		30	1.44
Total votes		2,088	100
General election
Democratic	Marty Walsh (incumbent)	13,744	98.19
Write-in		253	1.81
Total votes		13,997	100

=== Boston mayor ===
2013 Boston mayoral election
Primary election
Party	Candidate	Votes	%
Nonpartisan	Marty Walsh	20,854	18.47
Nonpartisan	John R. Connolly	19,435	17.21
Nonpartisan	Charlotte Golar Richie	15,546	13.77
Nonpartisan	Daniel Conley	12,775	11.32
Nonpartisan	Felix Arroyo	9,895	8.76
Nonpartisan	John Barros	9,148	8.10
Nonpartisan	Robert Consalvo	8,603	7.62
Nonpartisan	Michael Ross	8,164	7.23
Nonpartisan	Bill Walczak	3,825	3.39
Nonpartisan	Charles Yancey	2,389	2.12
Nonpartisan	Charles Clemons	1,800	1.59
Nonpartisan	David Wyatt	334	0.30
Write-in		130	0.12
Total votes		112,898	100
General election
Nonpartisan	Marty Walsh	72,583	51.54
Nonpartisan	John R. Connolly	67,694	48.07
Write-in		560	0.40
Total votes		140,837	100

2017 Boston mayoral election
Primary election
Party	Candidate	Votes	%
Nonpartisan	Marty Walsh (incumbent)	34,882	62.52
Nonpartisan	Tito Jackson	16,216	29.07
Nonpartisan	Robert Cappucci	3,736	6.70
Nonpartisan	Joseph Wiley	529	0.95
Write-in		428	0.77
Total votes		55,791	100
General election
Nonpartisan	Marty Walsh (incumbent)	70,197	65.37
Nonpartisan	Tito Jackson	36,472	33.97
Write-in		708	0.66
Total votes		107,377	100

== See also ==
- Timeline of Boston, 2010s
- List of mayors of the 50 largest cities in the United States

== Notes ==
Political offices
Preceded by Thomas Menino	Mayor of Boston; 2014–2021	Succeeded by Kim Janey; Acting
Preceded by Al Stewart; Acting	United States Secretary of Labor; 2021–2023	Succeeded by Julie Su; Acting
U.S. order of precedence (ceremonial)
Preceded by Xavier Becerra as Former U.S. Cabinet Member	Order of precedence of the United States as Former U.S. Cabinet Member	Succeeded by Kristi Noem as Former U.S. Cabinet Member
