= Dennis White (police commissioner) =

American police officer

43rd Commissioner of the Boston Police Department
- In office February 1, 2021 – June 7, 2021; Suspended: February 3, 2021 – June 7, 2021
- Mayor: Marty Walsh; Kim Janey (acting)
- Preceded by: William G. Gross
- Succeeded by: Michael Cox; Gregory Long (acting)

Personal details
- Born: 1961 or 1962 (age 64–65) Boston, Massachusetts, U.S.
- Education: Newbury College

Dennis A. White (born c. 1962) is an American police officer who was briefly Commissioner of the Boston Police Department (Note: The police commissioner is a City of Boston position appointed by the Mayor of Boston; the highest rank within the Boston Police Department proper is Superintendent-in-Chief.) in 2021. After being sworn in on February 1, 2021, White was placed on leave two days later, as the city conducted an investigation into a 1999 allegation of domestic violence against his wife and teenage daughter. On June 7, 2021, Acting Mayor Kim Janey fired White after legal challenges.

== Early life and education ==
White is a native of the Four Corners area of the Dorchester neighborhood of Boston, and graduated from Jeremiah E. Burke High School in the Dorchester neighborhood. He spent five years as a member of the Boston Fire Department. In 2005, he earned a bachelor's degree in legal studies from Newbury College in nearby Brookline, Massachusetts.

== Police career ==
As of January 2021, White had been a member of the Boston Police Department for 32 years. He rose through leadership roles, becoming a deputy superintendent in 2014. In August 2018, Boston police commissioner William G. Gross promoted White to superintendent and named him chief of staff. In 2020, White was one of two police officers on an 11-member task force assembled to review and recommend improvements to policing in Boston, following the murder of George Floyd.

=== Appointment as Police Commissioner ===
On January 28, 2021, Gross abruptly announced his retirement, effective the next day. On Gross’ recommendation, Boston mayor Marty Walsh named White his successor as commissioner, with White becoming acting commissioner on January 29. Formally sworn in on February 1, White became the department's 43rd commissioner and second Black commissioner.

== Allegation of domestic violence ==
On February 3, 2021, White was placed on leave, in light of "the handling of a 1999 allegation of domestic violence." Superintendent-in-chief Gregory Long was named acting commissioner while the City of Boston hired an outside investigator to conduct an investigation. The 1999 incident involved White allegedly saying he “wanted to shoot" his wife and making threatening statements to his teenage daughter. These allegations resulted in a judge issuing a restraining order on May 5, 1999, that forced White to vacate his home, stay away from his wife and children, and surrender his service weapon. Public records requests from The Boston Globe for internal affairs records about the incident were refused by the City of Boston.

On May 14, 2021, White's attorneys filed a motion in Suffolk Superior Court requesting a preliminary injunction and temporary restraining order, stating that acting Boston mayor Kim Janey planned to fire White, and that such removal would require a hearing and cause. In a news conference later that day, Janey stated that White was still on administrative leave, awaiting outcome of the court action. Also on May 14, a report from an independent investigator was released with additional details of the 1999 domestic abuse allegations. The report alleged:

- Witnesses were warned not to cooperate with the investigation, and the city's lawyer attempted to shut down the investigation after 10 days.
- Witness reported White's wife said he burned her hair, put her face on a stove and tried to turn it on, stepped on her face and legs, choked her, and threw a television at her.
- Repeated calls by White's wife to the Boston Police Department's domestic violence unit resulted in no action, records of complaints were apparently removed, and the domestic violence unit was apparently punished for attempting to handle the complaints as required.
- White's lawyer threatened to sue the investigator for defamation.
- In 1993, White was involved in a physical altercation with his 19-year-old niece (who was living at his house) after she rejected a sexual advance from him and told his wife about it.
- White lives in Randolph, Massachusetts, despite the requirement to be a resident of the City of Boston. The deadline for compliance is six months after promotion to the police command staff.

On May 20, lawyers for White and the City of Boston presented their arguments to a judge, with White's counsel asserting that Mayor Walsh was aware of the 1999 allegations at the time White was appointed, therefore White could not now be removed on the same grounds; in a statement, Walsh denied prior knowledge of the allegations. On May 25, a judge ruled against White, denying the request for a preliminary injunction. The following day, the judge granted White's attorney a motion for a delay, to "have the opportunity for a higher court to review". A judge of the Massachusetts Appeals Court denied the appeal on May 27. On May 31, White notified Janey of two video affidavits, from his daughter and former sister-in-law, stating that White was not an abuser and was actually the victim of domestic abuse. On June 2, Janey held a hearing with White. That same day, White's ex-wife made public statements asserting that White did physically and emotionally abuse her.

On June 7, 2021, Acting Mayor Janey fired White from his position as police commissioner, ending a five-month period of limbo while independent investigations and legal challenges were conducted.

== Defamation suit ==
In 2021, White filed suit against the City of Boston and former mayor Janey on multiple grounds, including defamation, violation of his right to privacy, and lack of due process. Multiple claims were dismissed in 2022, and the remaining claims were dismissed by Leo T. Sorokin of the United States District Court for the District of Massachusetts on August 19, 2024. White's lawyer stated that the dismissal would be appealed.

== Notes ==
Police appointments
| Preceded by William G. Gross | Commissioner of the Boston Police Department; February 1, 2021 – June 7, 2021; On leave: February 3, 2021–June 7, 2021 | Succeeded by Michael Cox |
