= Al Stewart (government official) =

American civil servant (born 1955)

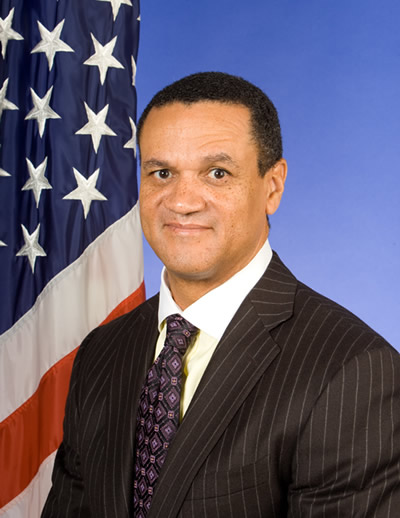

Acting United States Secretary of Labor
- In office January 20, 2021 – March 23, 2021
- President: Joe Biden
- Preceded by: Eugene Scalia
- Succeeded by: Marty Walsh

Personal details
- Born: 1955 (age 70–71) Virginia, U.S.
- Education: Virginia State University (BA); University of North Carolina, Greensboro (MA); North Carolina Central University (JD)

Milton Al Stewart (born 1955) is an American attorney. He served as acting United States secretary of labor from January 20, 2021 to March 23, 2021. While serving in an acting position, Stewart remains the deputy assistant secretary of labor in charge of managing departmental day-to-day operations in the national office and six regional offices.

== Education ==
Stewart earned a Bachelor of Arts degree in history from Virginia State University, a Master of Arts in history and public administration from the University of North Carolina at Greensboro, and a Juris Doctor from North Carolina Central University.

== Career ==
Stewart's career in the Department of Labor began in 1991. He has served in numerous roles within the department, including director of the Business Operations Center, director of the Office of Administrative Services, director of Office of the Assistant Secretary for Administration and Management's Strategic and Performance Planning effort, and the director of the Office of Procurement and Grant Policy.

In March 2018, Stewart became the deputy assistant secretary of labor for operations.

As the Cabinet of the previous administration traditionally resigns at noon on inauguration day, Stewart was named acting secretary following the resignation of Eugene Scalia on January 20, 2021. He served in an acting capacity until Marty Walsh was confirmed by the United States Senate on March 22.

Political offices
Preceded by Eugene Scalia	United States Secretary of Labor; Acting; 2021	Succeeded by Marty Walsh
