= Mayoralty of Thomas Menino =

1993–2014 mayoralty in Boston, US

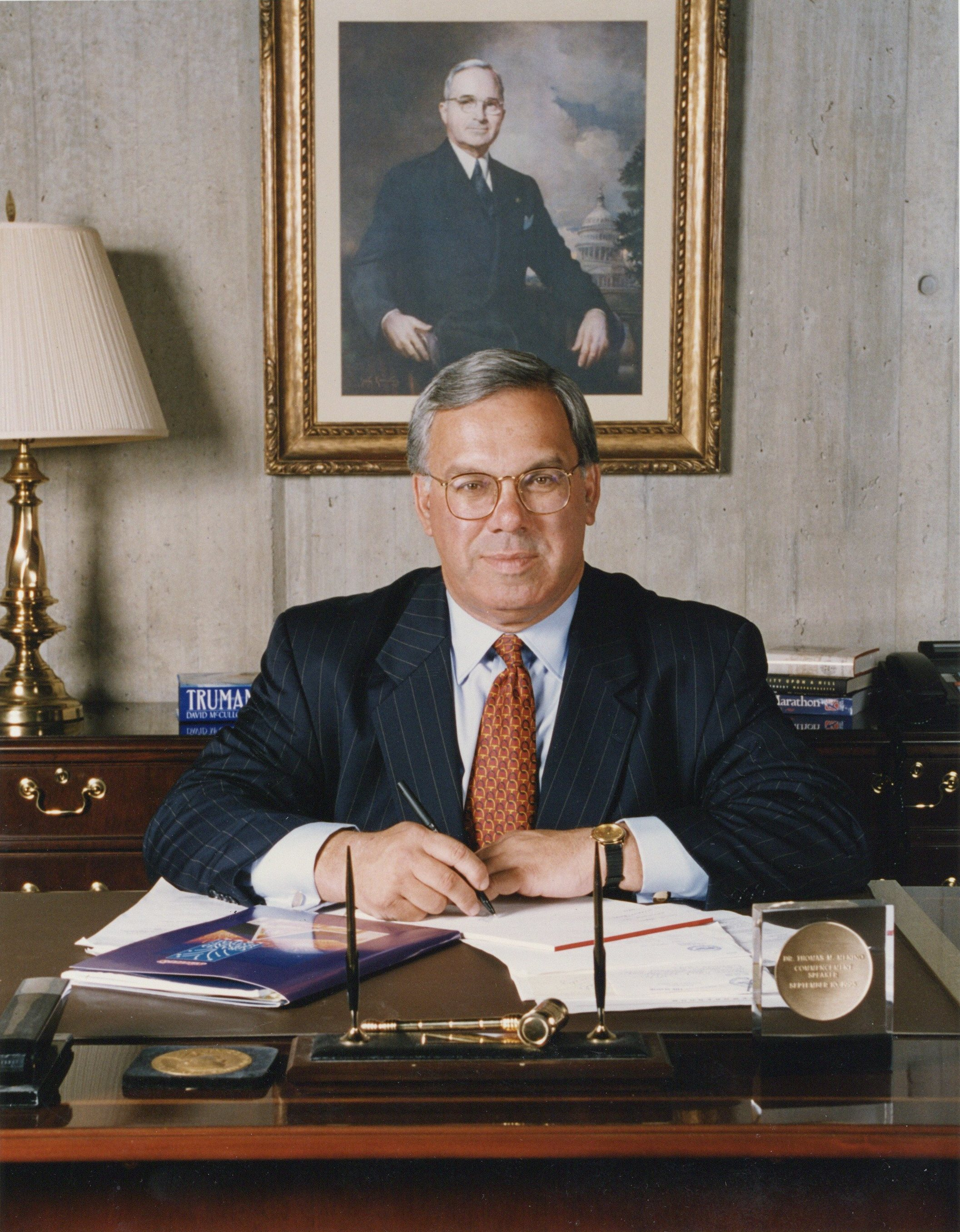
- Mayoralty of Thomas Menino; November 16, 1993 – January 6, 2014 (Acting mayor: July 12, 1993 – Nov. 16, 1993)
- Mayor: Thomas Menino
- Party: Democratic
- Election: 1993, 1997, 2001, 2005, 2009

Thomas Menino served as mayor of Boston, Massachusetts from 1993 through 2014. He is the longest serving mayor in the city's history. Menino first became acting mayor in July 1993, after Raymond Flynn resigned as mayor to assume the post of United States ambassador to the Holy See (Menino's then-position as Boston City Council president meant that he automatically assumed the post of "acting mayor" upon the vacancy created by Flynn's resignation). Menino was elected mayor in the subsequent 1993 Boston mayoral election, and was reelected to additional terms in the four subsequent elections, making for an unprecedented and unsurpassed twenty year tenure. On March 28, 2013, Menino announced that he would not seek a sixth term.

After Menino's October 2014 death, Katherine Q. Seelye of The New York Times wrote that Menino "presided over one of the most successful urban renaissances in modern American history" as mayor. Dubbed an "urban mechanic", Menino had a reputation for focusing on "nuts and bolts" issues and enjoyed very high public approval ratings as mayor. During his tenure, Boston saw a significant amount of new development, including the Seaport District, the redevelopment of Dudley Square (today known as "Nubian Square"), and the redevelopment of the area surrounding Fenway Park. Alongside this development, gentrification priced some longtime residents out of neighborhoods. Allegations were made of favoritism by Menino towards certain developers. During his tenure as mayor, crime in Boston fell to unprecedented lows, and the city came to rank among the safest large cities in the United States. Menino also undertook a number of environmentally-focused actions. In the last year of Menino's tenure, the city faced the Boston Marathon bombing, an incident of domestic terrorism.

Menino was a liberal member of the Democratic Party. Menino led a powerful political machine in Boston and also played roles in national politics, such as serving as president of the United States Conference of Mayors from 2002 to 2003, bringing the 2004 Democratic National Convention to Boston, and co-founding the group Mayors Against Illegal Guns alongside New York City mayor Michael Bloomberg.

== Politics ==
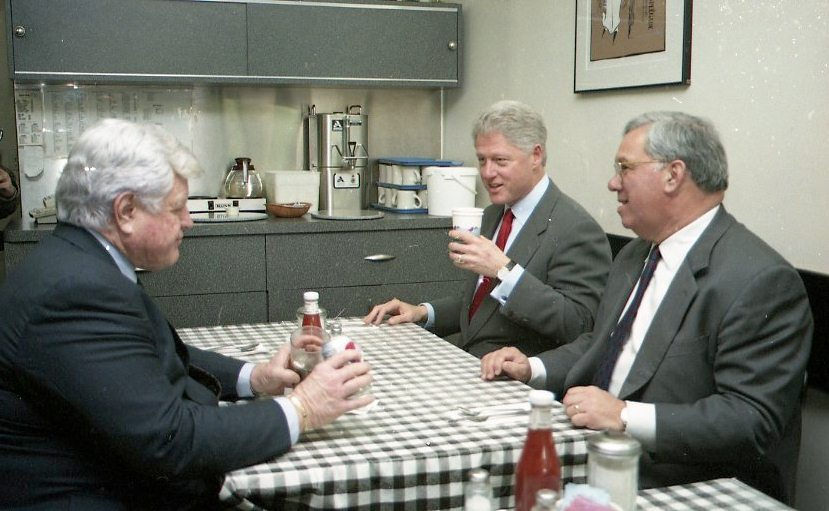
Menino with Senator Ted Kennedy and President Bill Clinton at Mike's City Diner in Boston on January 18, 2001

Menino was a liberal and a Democrat.

Menino was the first Italian American to lead the city of Boston. Menino was the city's first non-Irish American mayor since the Great Depression.

Menino led a powerful political machine in Boston. In 2009, the Boston Globe wrote that "Menino has assembled the most extensive political operation in modern Boston history over his 16 years in office, rivaling that of legendary mayor James Michael Curley. He's done it the old-fashioned way, by blurring the lines between politics and policy, between city work and campaign work, delivering services to everyday residents and warnings to his rare foes—many of them intended to strengthen his electoral standing."

=== Acting mayoralty (July–November 1993) ===
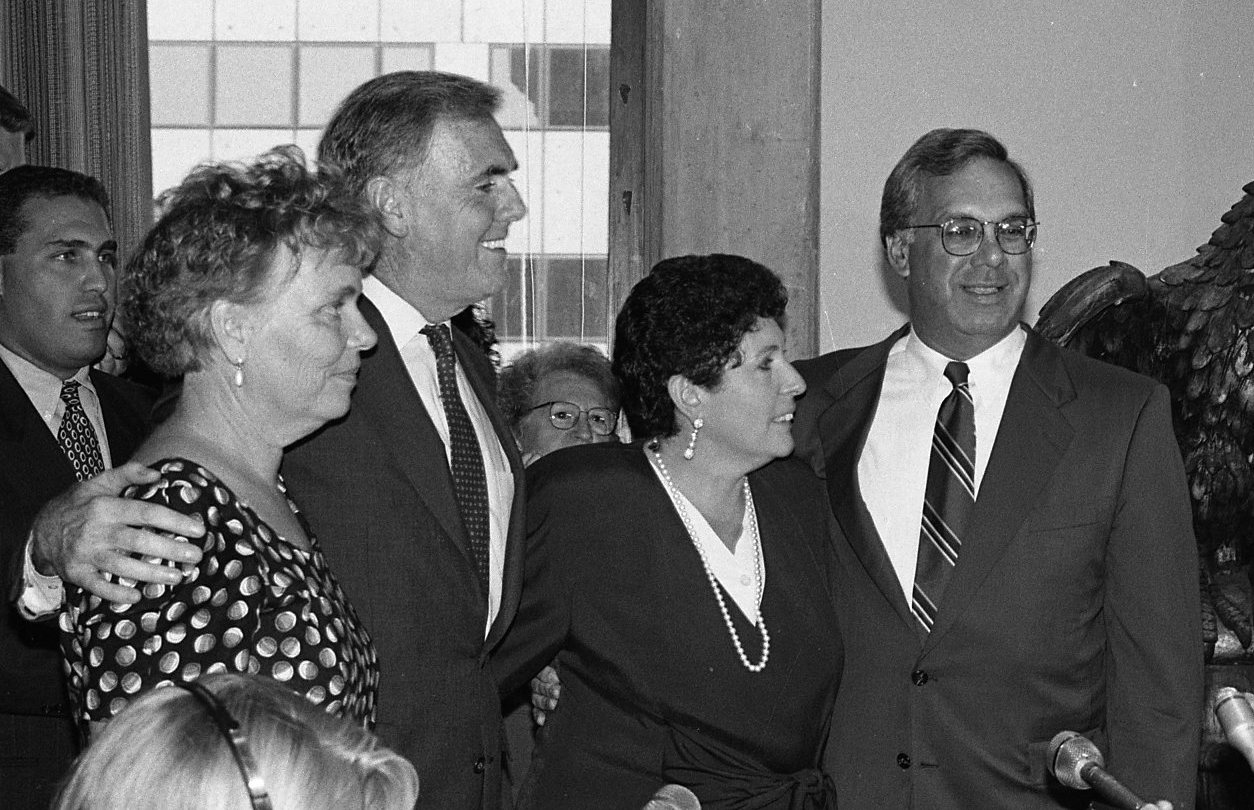
Outgoing mayor Flynn with Menino at Menino's swearing-in as acting mayor

In March 1993, President Clinton nominated Boston Mayor Raymond Flynn to be the United States Ambassador to the Holy See. Mayor Flynn accepted the nomination, effectively making Menino, who was president of the Boston City Council at the time, the presumptive future acting mayor.

Menino had had a longtime friendship with outgoing mayor Flynn. However, their relationship was noted to have become somewhat terser during the period in which Flynn was preparing to hand over the office to Menino. One cause for their rift was that, after Menino had promised he would appoint 100 new police officers when he took office, Flynn beat him to the chase and did so himself, which angered Menino.

Upon Flynn's resignation on July 12, 1993, Menino became acting mayor of Boston until the upcoming November 1993 election.

Some initially saw Menino as likely to be a sort of "caretaker" of the office, with Brian McGrory of The Boston Globe writing at the start of Menino's acting mayoralty, that to some, "Menino is believed to be a caretaker, a known quantity, a moderate compromise builder who is unlikely to bring great change or wreak serious harm on the city." McGregory also reported that some of Menino's City Council colleagues believed that Menino had an undistinguished legislative record as a city councilor.

A number of actions that he took immediately after taking office were characterized by analysts as shoring up Menino's image for a mayoral run. In early August 1993, Menino signed a grant agreement with the state which advanced $3.7 million in state funds to be allotted for the construction of a materials recycling facility in the city. Menino put a freeze on water utility rates in place in the city, which were at rising due to the need to pay off the expenses of a court-ordered cleanup of Boston Harbor. Menino's freeze was popular with the city's residents, though there were questions as to whether an acting mayor actually held the authority to take such action.

Ahead of becoming acting mayor, Menino recruited John P. White to create a plan for Menino's handling of the city's business sector. White was the Director of Harvard University's Center for Business and Government, a former Eastman Kodak executive, and had written the economic plan of the 1992 presidential campaign of Ross Perot.

During his acting mayoralty, Menino temporarily appointed Alfreda Harristo to fill a vacancy on the Boston School Committee. After Harristo cast the decisive vote in the Boston School Committee's rejecting of a teacher contract proposal, the Boston Teachers Union sued, questioning Menino's powers as acting mayor to make such an appointment. A judge dismissed the lawsuit for lack of standing.

=== 1993 mayoral campaign ===
Menino went from "acting mayor" to "mayor" after winning the 1993 Boston mayoral election.

Menino initially ran a low-profile campaign, having informally indicated his intentions ahead of taking office as acting mayor for months. Before becoming acting mayor, Menino quietly raised significant amounts in contributions for his campaign. After taking office as acting mayor, Menino ran a sort of "Rose Garden campaign" that played up his acting incumbency and used the perks of the office. He formally declared himself as a candidate for mayor on August 16, 1993, after many other candidates had already formally entered the race.

When running for mayor, Menino pledged to serve "only two terms, and that's it for me." However, his tenure ultimately exceeded this in length. Menino ran for a third term in 2001 and quipped, "I promised I'd serve two terms–in every century."

=== Reelection campaigns ===
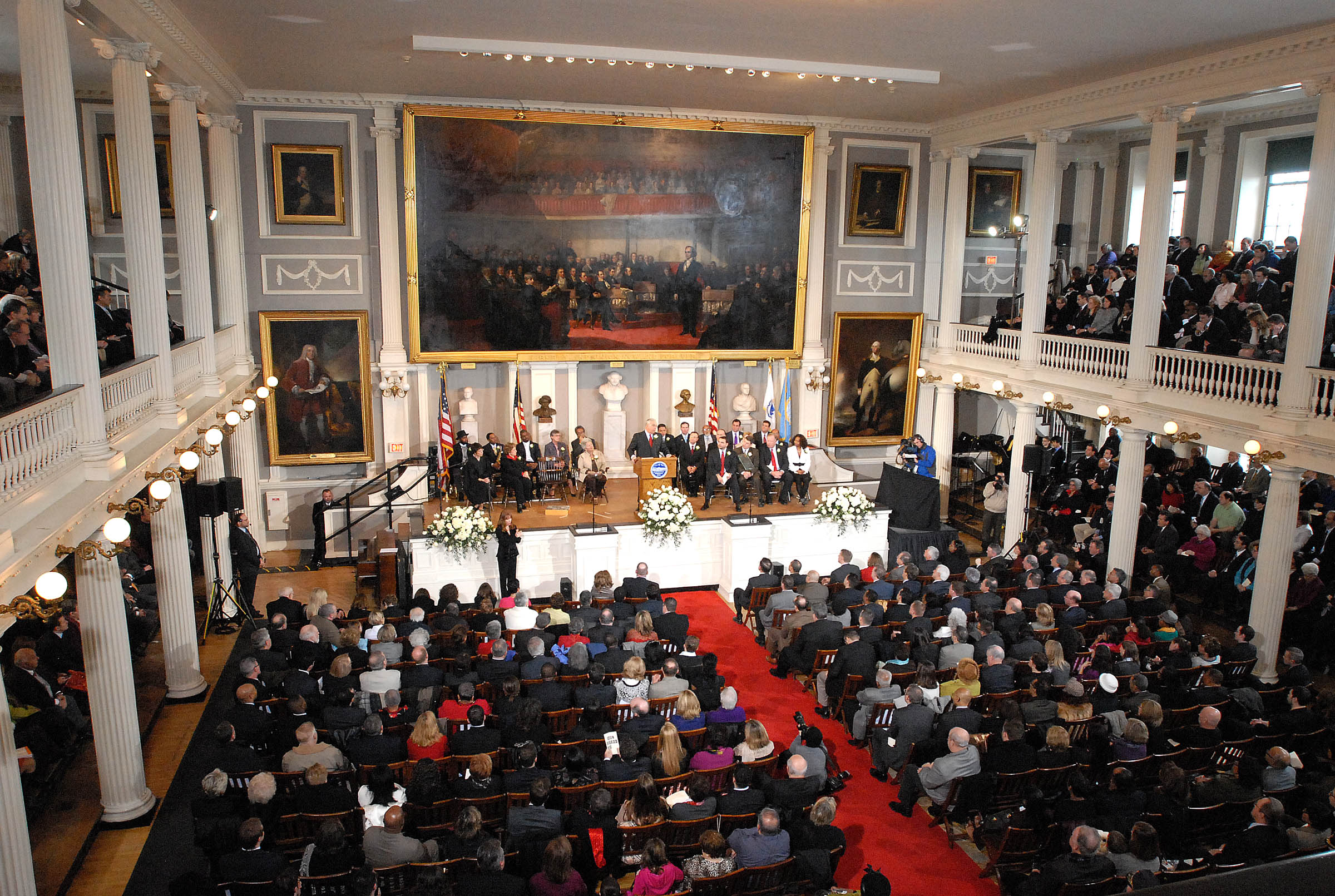
Menino's fifth mayoral inauguration, held on January 4, 2010, at Faneuil Hall

In 1997, Menino was re-elected, running formally unopposed after no challenger managed to collect enough valid signatures to qualify for the ballot.

In the 2001 mayoral general election, Menino faced Peggy Davis-Mullen, with a third opponent Althea Garrison having been eliminated in the nonpartisan primary. Menino was heavily favored to win, with an approval rating near 85%. Davis-Mullen lacked in name recognition and additionally faced a slew of stories in The Boston Globe and The Boston Herald during her campaign with negative allegations that hurt her public image. Menino won 73.37% of the vote in the primary election and 76.06% of the vote in the general election.

In 2005, Menino won 67.52% of the vote against Maura Hennigan. Menino faced a negative campaign from Henigan, who blamed Menino for the city's high cost of living and a recent rise in its crime rate. However, Menino had stayed above the fray, largely not responding to her attacks.

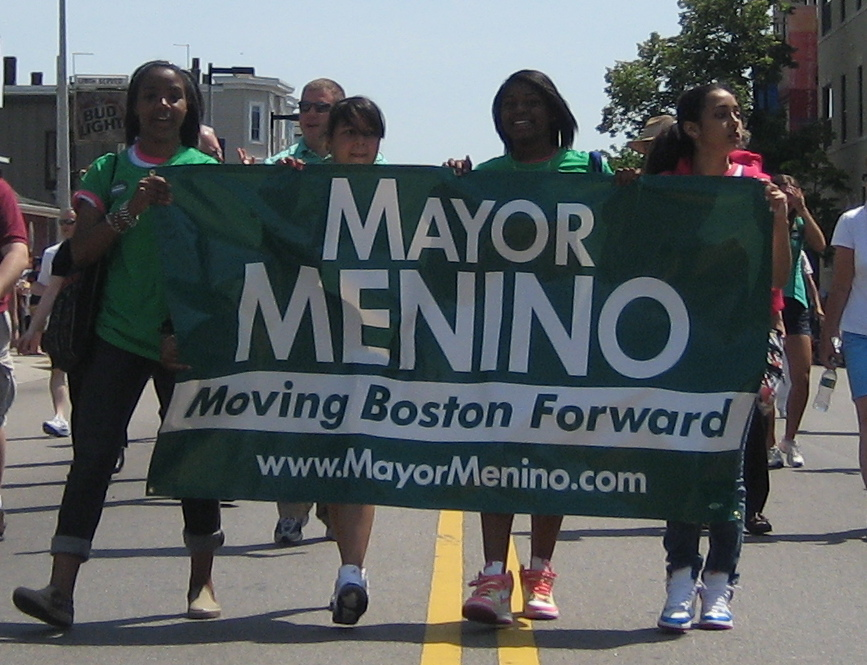
Supporters of Menino's 2009 reelection campaign marching in the 2009 Dorchester Day Parade

In the 2009 general election, Menino faced Michael F. Flaherty after Sam Yoon and Kevin McCrea were eliminated in the nonpartisan primary. Menino won 50.52% of the vote in the primary and 57.27% of the vote in the general election. In the general election, Flaherty teamed up with eliminated candidate Sam Yoon, making Yoon his unofficial running mate by promising to appoint Yoon to a recreated "deputy mayor" position if elected. During the 2009 campaign, The Boston Globe printed an article alleging dirty tricks against political opponents and their supporters in Menino's mayoral campaign that year. The article reported several instances of questionable behavior, including cases of Menino's associates monitoring mayoral opponent Michael F. Flaherty's Facebook affiliations. According to the article, the Menino campaign sent out a campaign memo containing the name of at least one small-business owner who supported Flaherty. In 2011, Flaherty alleged that his former running mate Sam Yoon had to leave Boston after running against Menino because the mayor's allies made it difficult for Yoon to find a job locally.

=== National politics ===
In May 2002, Menino was elected president of the United States Conference of Mayors. He held this role for thirteen months.

In 2003, Menino served on the selection committee for the Rudy Bruner Award for Urban Excellence.

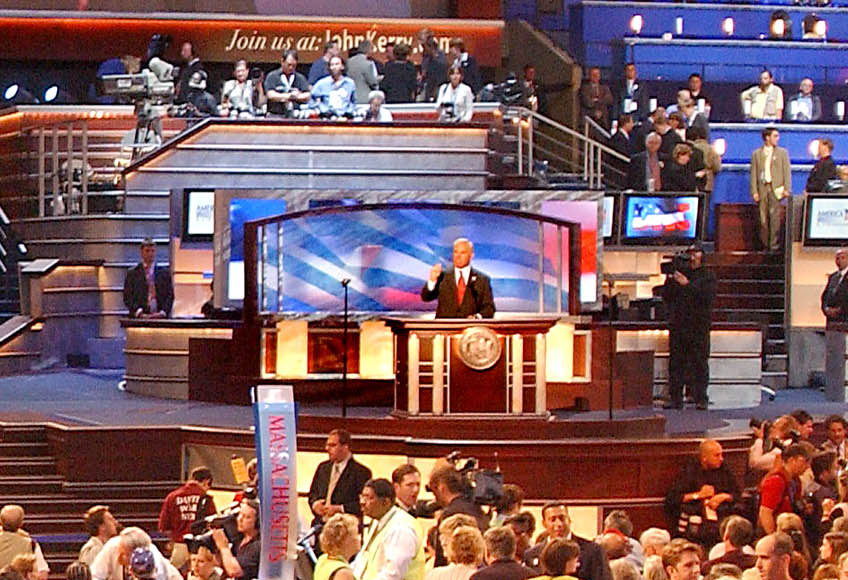
Menino welcomes delegates to the 2004 DNC

Menino brought the Democratic National Convention to Boston in 2004. The convention was controversial due to fundraising difficulties, security concerns, protests by unions, and inconvenience to residents. But Menino estimated that the convention generated $150 million in business for the city; meanwhile, other estimates suggest that the convention generated $14.8 million for the city.

On April 25, 2006, Menino and New York City Mayor Michael Bloomberg hosted a summit at Gracie Mansion in New York City, during which the Mayors Against Illegal Guns Coalition was formed. The coalition stated its goal of "making the public safer by getting illegal guns off the streets"—Menino remained co-chair there until he left the office. The initial group consisted of 15 mayors; the 15 drafted and signed a statement of principles and set a goal to expand their membership to 50 mayors by the end of 2006. That goal was met six months ahead of schedule and led to its current membership of more than 900 mayors, with members from both major political parties and 40 states.

Menino supported the 2008 presidential campaign of Hillary Clinton, sending his own campaign workers to New Hampshire to work for her candidacy ahead of the 2008 New Hampshire Democratic presidential primary. After Barack Obama secured the Democratic Party's presidential nomination, Menino opposed the nomination, Menino publicly opposed the prospect of Clinton being selected as his vice presidential running mate, believing that her husband, former president Bill Clinton, would pose a problem by being an overshadowing presence as second gentleman of the United States if Hillary Clinton were to serve as vice president, which he believed would be to the detriment of Obama.

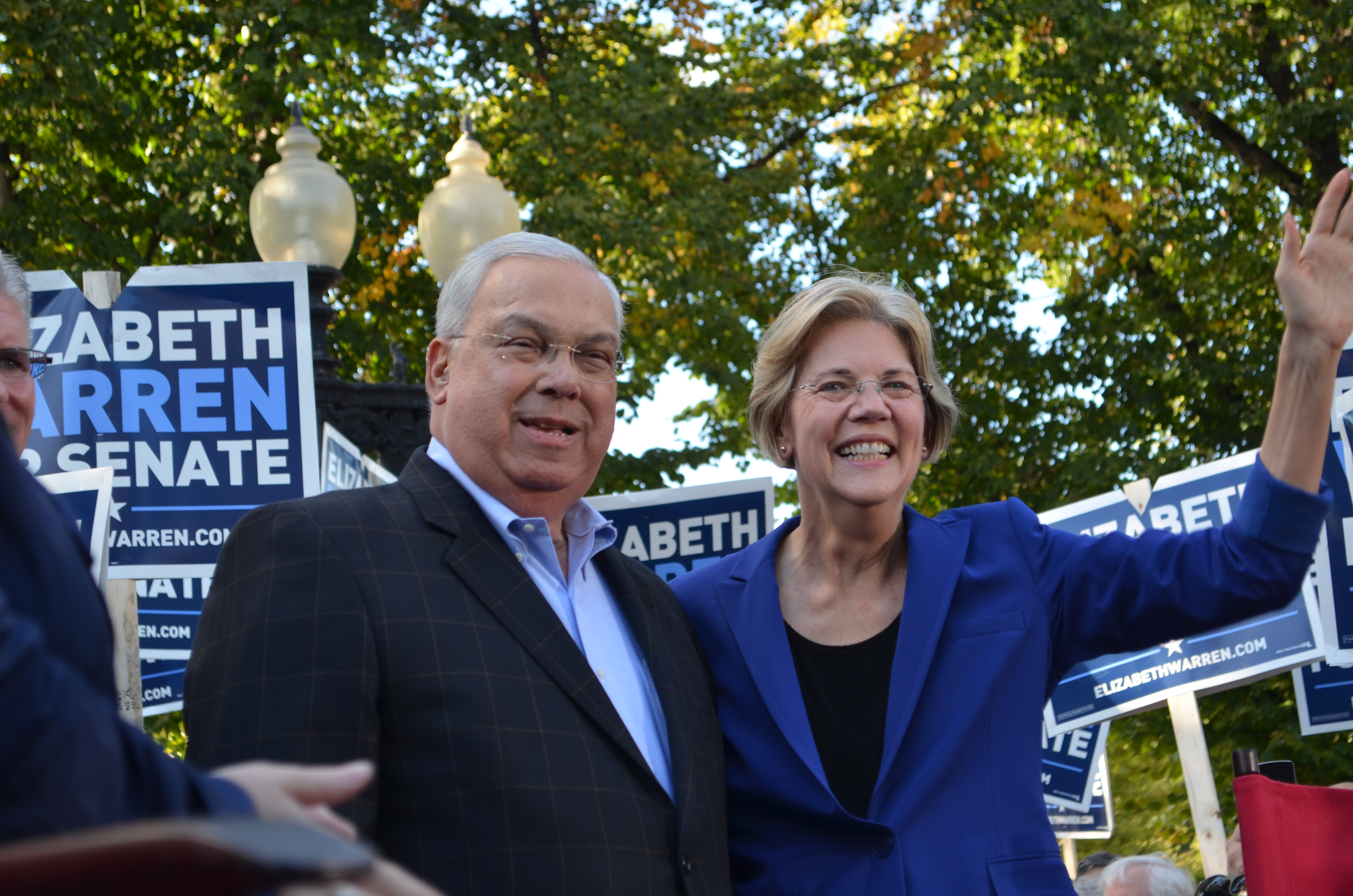
Menino with Elizabeth Warren at the event where he endorsed her for U.S. Senate

Menino spoke at the 2012 Democratic National Convention. His speech criticized Republican nominee Mitt Romney, who had formerly served as governor of Massachusetts during part of Menino's mayoralty. In September 2012, he endorsed Democratic nominee Elizabeth Warren in the 2012 United States Senate election in Massachusetts.

== Fiscal matters ==
Throughout Menino's tenure, the city of Boston had an operating surplus. This led Moody's Investors Service and Standard & Poor's to boost the city's bond rating a combined nine times over the course of Menino's mayoralty.

== Social issues ==
Menino was a cofounder of Mayors Against Illegal Guns.

Menino supported abortion rights. He also supported public funding of abortions.

=== Gay rights ===
By the time he was elected mayor in 1993, Menino had already taken the public position of supporting that gay and lesbian couples be allowed to act as foster parents.

At the time of his 1993 mayoral campaign, Menino took a position supporting an existing municipal executive order which allowed city employees sick leave or bereavement time in instances in which a domestic partner or other household member has taken ill or died.

In 1998, Menino signed an executive order allowing domestic partners and dependents of gay, lesbian, and unmarried municipal employees to receive health benefits from the city. He was among the first mayors in the United States to extend such benefits to same-sex partners of municipal employees.

Menino came out in support of same-sex marriage in 2003.

From 1995 onwards, Menino refused to partake in the South Boston St. Patrick's Day parade due to their exclusion of LGBTQ groups and displays.

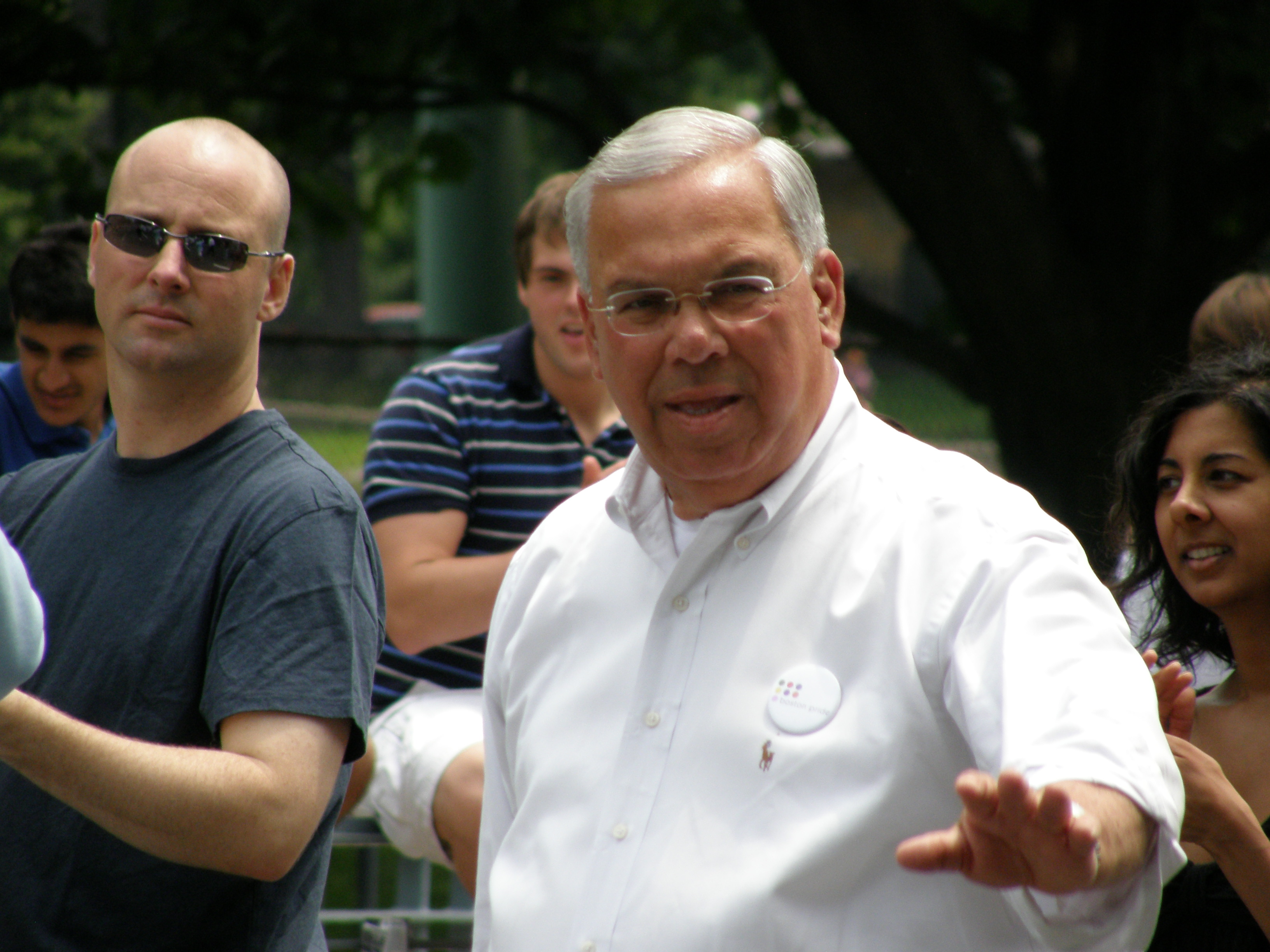
Mayor Menino at the city's 2008 pride parade

In 2012, Menino headed the Mayors for Freedom to Marry effort.

On July 19, 2012, Mayor Menino stated that he would work to prevent Chick-fil-A from opening restaurants within Boston, especially near the Freedom Trail, citing their opposition to same-sex marriage and what he called Boston's status as "a leader when it comes to social justice and opportunities for all." The next day, Menino sent a letter to Chick-fil-A president Dan Cathy. Menino urged the company to "back out of your plans to locate in Boston" because of his stance on gay marriage. Gay rights supporters applauded the mayor's support of gay marriage rights, while First Amendment advocates decried the potential for abuse of office to infringe on free speech rights. Menino later stated that he knew there was little he could do as mayor to prevent them from opening restaurants and that he was stating his personal opinion. He maintained that they were not welcome in the city, however. Boston Herald columnist Michael Graham called Menino's stance nonsensical, in light of Menino's previous friendly relations with the Islamic Society of Boston, which at one point listed among its "spiritual guides" Yusuf al-Qaradawi, who has called for homosexuals to be put to death.

== Urban development ==
During Menino's tenure, the city's total square footage of office and residential space increased by 11%, and 80 million square feet of development was constructed.

In the 1990s, Menino made an effort to redevelop Boston City Hall Plaza which was shelved after it failed to receive federal support.

Menino was highly supportive of a project by the Islamic Society of Boston to build a mosque in Roxbury, including selling city land to the mosque at a significantly below-market rate and participating in a groundbreaking ceremony for the mosque in 2002. The project became increasingly controversial due to the ISB's alleged ties to various individual terrorists and terrorist organizations, and, by 2008, when the initial building was completed, the Boston Phoenix reported that "Menino and other city representatives have vanished from public association with the project."

In 2006, Menino proposed two major construction projects that would have significantly impact the city, but ultimately failed to materialize. Trans National Place is a proposed 1,000-foot (300 m) tower to be built on the site of a city-owned parking garage in Boston's Financial District. The second proposal called for the city to sell Boston City Hall, a 1960s brutalist structure. Menino would then have the city use the proceeds from the sale to fund construction of a new seat of government on the South Boston waterfront, on the site of the current Bank of America Pavilion (Drydock 4). Menino abandoned the idea of moving the city's city hall in January 2009.

Menino supported the proposed redevelopment of Filene's site in Downtown Crossing into a 39-floor tower. This was fast-tracked by the Boston Redevelopment Authority in 2007 but halted during the Great Recession. This site still sat vacant, as a result of the failure of this faltered project. It later became home to the Millennium Tower.

In 2008, the Friends of Mary Cummings Park delivered a complaint to the Massachusetts Attorney General alleging breach of charitable trust by the Menino administration which had sought to sell more than 200 acres (81 ha) of public parkland for development. The Menino administration had used hundreds of thousands of dollars from the Mary P.C. Cummings care and maintenance trust fund to pay for legal services working toward breaking the trust and to hire a real estate agent to prepare an extensive plan on how to develop the public parkland as either commercial or residential real estate, substantially depleting the fund.

In 2012, Menino made an effort to get a casino developed at Suffolk Downs in East Boston and opposed a proposed casino development in Everett, Massachusetts (which would have used a small portion of land located in Boston's city limits).

At the end of Menino's tenure, the city was undergoing a construction boom, with Moody's Investor Service having credited the city in 2012, having "the strongest commercial real estate market in the country since the 2008 recession".

=== Accusations of favoritism towards developers ===
Menino often faced criticism accusing him of playing "favorites" with developers.

In 2001, Menino intervened to help stop a chain drugstore from opening a few blocks from a pharmacy owned by a close friend and political supporter. The case raised the question of favoritism and cronyism in the city's zoning and licensing practices.

=== Downtown Boston Business Improvement District ===
Since the mid-1990s, Menino had pushed for the idea of the downtown business improvement district. However, legislation for such a plan repeatedly was defeated in the state legislature, before legislation giving state approval finally succeeded in 2010.

=== Dudley Square (Nubian Square) ===
Menino gave priority to the redevelopment of Dudley Square (today known as "Nubian Square"). Over his tenure, there was roughly $330 million of private development there. In March 2011, Menino proposed renovating the abandoned Ferdinand's Furniture building in the area and relocating 400 Boston Public School employees from the School Department's headquarters at 26 Court Street, a block from Boston's City Hall, a circa-1895, Baroque Revival structure located in Dudley Square. The renovation was estimated to cost $100–115 million, an amount raised by issuing municipal bonds that would be paid back by selling or leasing five of the city's municipal buildings.

=== Housing ===
Between 2000 and 2010, Boston saw 20,500 new units of housing constructed, including 5,500 units of affordable housing. The influx of millions of dollars of new high-priced housing during Menino's tenure contributed to gentrification, which had the negative impact of pricing longtime residents out of neighborhoods.

More than 12,000 new college dormitory rooms were constructed in Boston during Menino's tenure.

=== Neighborhood development ===
Menino was also known for focusing on neighborhood development in Boston, organizing services by neighborhood, and appointing neighborhood coordinators who serve as ambassadors from the city in their areas, believing that development should happen in every neighborhood. In 2001, Governing magazine named Mayor Menino "Public Official of the Year" for effective neighborhood development in Boston. This model has spread to other cities as a result of its effectiveness.

=== Seaport District ===
Menino oversaw the development of the Seaport District, also known as the "Innovation District".

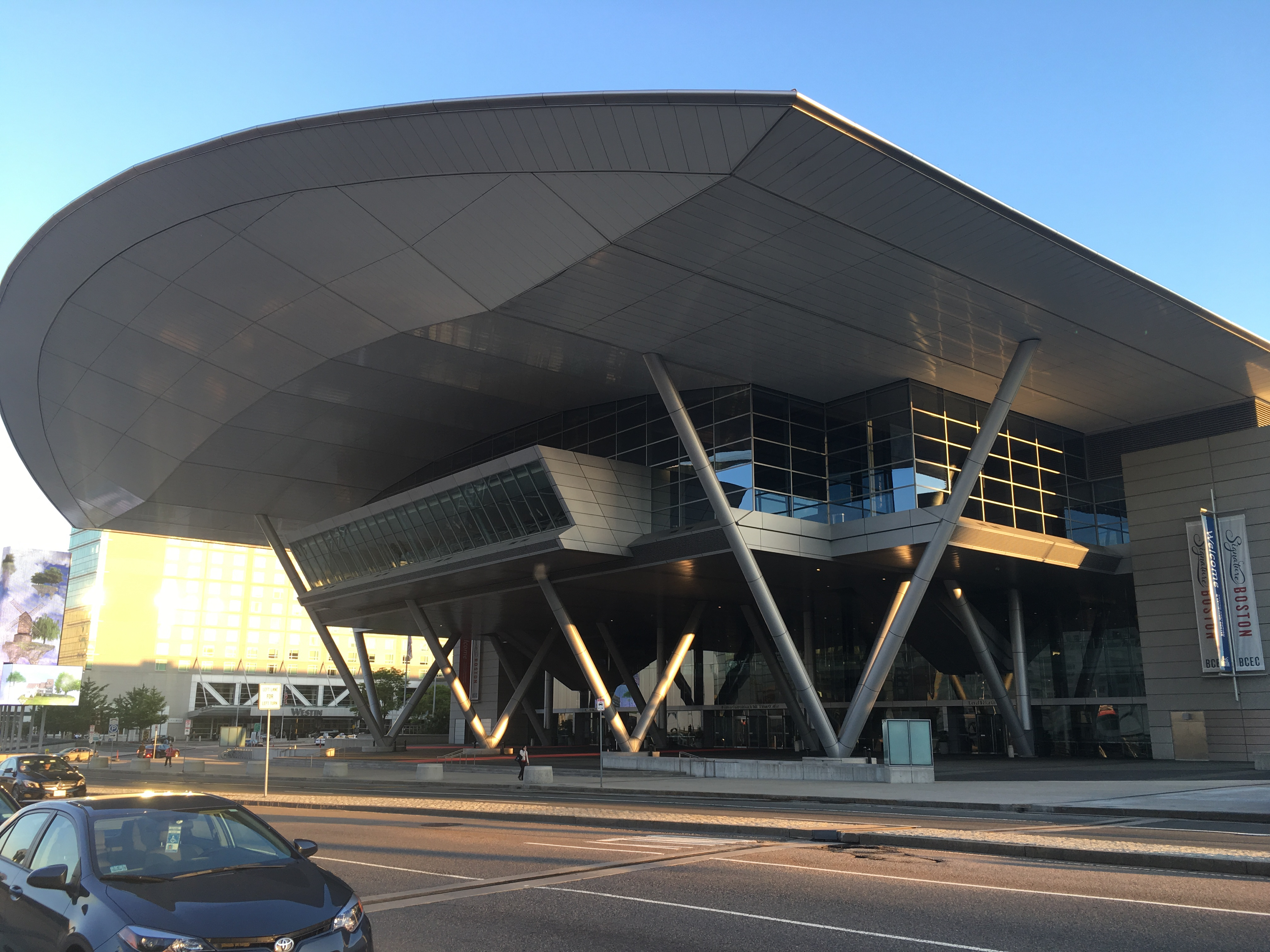
Menino strongly supported the construction of the Boston Convention & Exhibition Center

In June 2004, the city completed construction on the Boston Convention & Exhibition Center, a project which Menino had strongly supported for years. When Menino had taken office, the city had only 293,000 square feet of convention space. By the time he left office, it had 1,3099,000 square feet of convention space. The construction of the Boston Convention & Exhibition Center marked a start to development of the Seaport District of the city.

In January 2010, Mayor Menino launched an initiative to create an urban environment fostering innovation, collaboration, and entrepreneurship on 1,000 acres (400 ha) of the South Boston waterfront. The so-called Innovation District includes the Fort Point neighborhood, Seaport Square, Fan Pier, and Marine Industrial Park. Of the initiative, Mayor Menino said: "A new approach is called for on the waterfront—one that is both more deliberate and more experimental. The massive expanse of the South Boston waterfront—with its existing knowledge base, opportunity for growth, and world-class infrastructure—is ripe to produce world-class products and services."

=== Sports venues ===
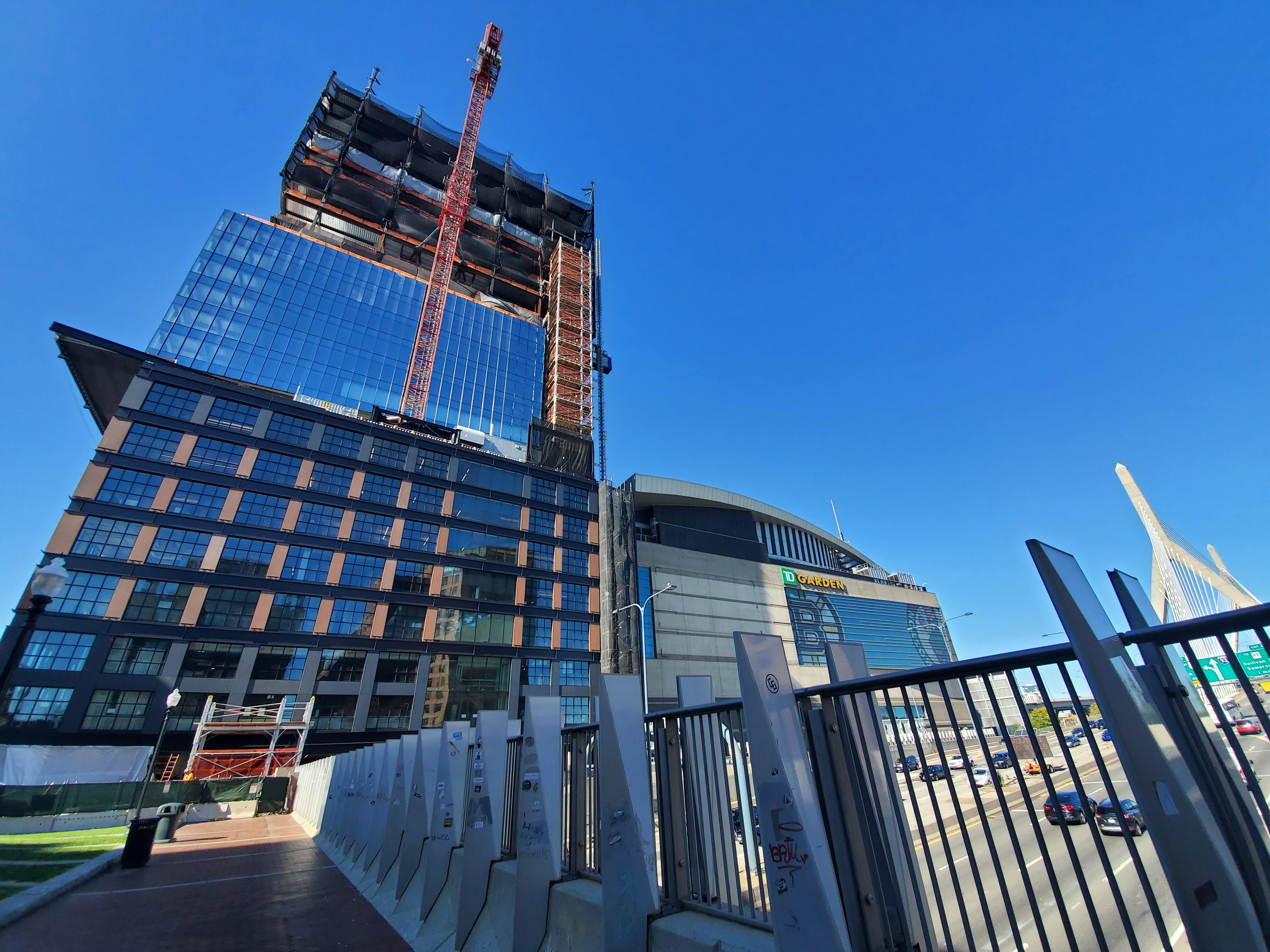
Menino was involved in providing millions of dollars in tax breaks for the development of a complex of high-rise towers surrounding the TD Garden arena

In the mid 1990s, Menino opposed two plans proposed by Robert Kraft for new venues that would have housed the New England Patriots in the city. One of these plans was the proposed Boston Sports Megaplex in Roxbury. The other of these plans was for a stand-alone waterfront football stadium in South Boston (where the Seaport District is today). Menino instead favored constructing a stand-alone convention center in South Boston, and urged instead for a location in the South Bay to be considered for the stadium for the New England Patriots.

Menino was involved with negotiating with Boston Red Sox ownership and the state of Massachusetts a deal to provide public funds to build a new baseball stadium near the existing Fenway Park. However, the Boston City Council rejected the deal, and the existing Fenway Park was instead renovated. After new ownership abandoned the idea of replacing Fenway Park, Menino supported their efforts to renovate the stadium, and also launched a review of the potential new development in the surrounding neighborhood. Following a 2004 rezoning effort of the neighborhood surrounding Fenway Park, the area began to see major new developments.

Menino was involved in providing millions of dollars in tax breaks for the development of a complex of high-rise towers surrounding the TD Garden arena.

== Education ==
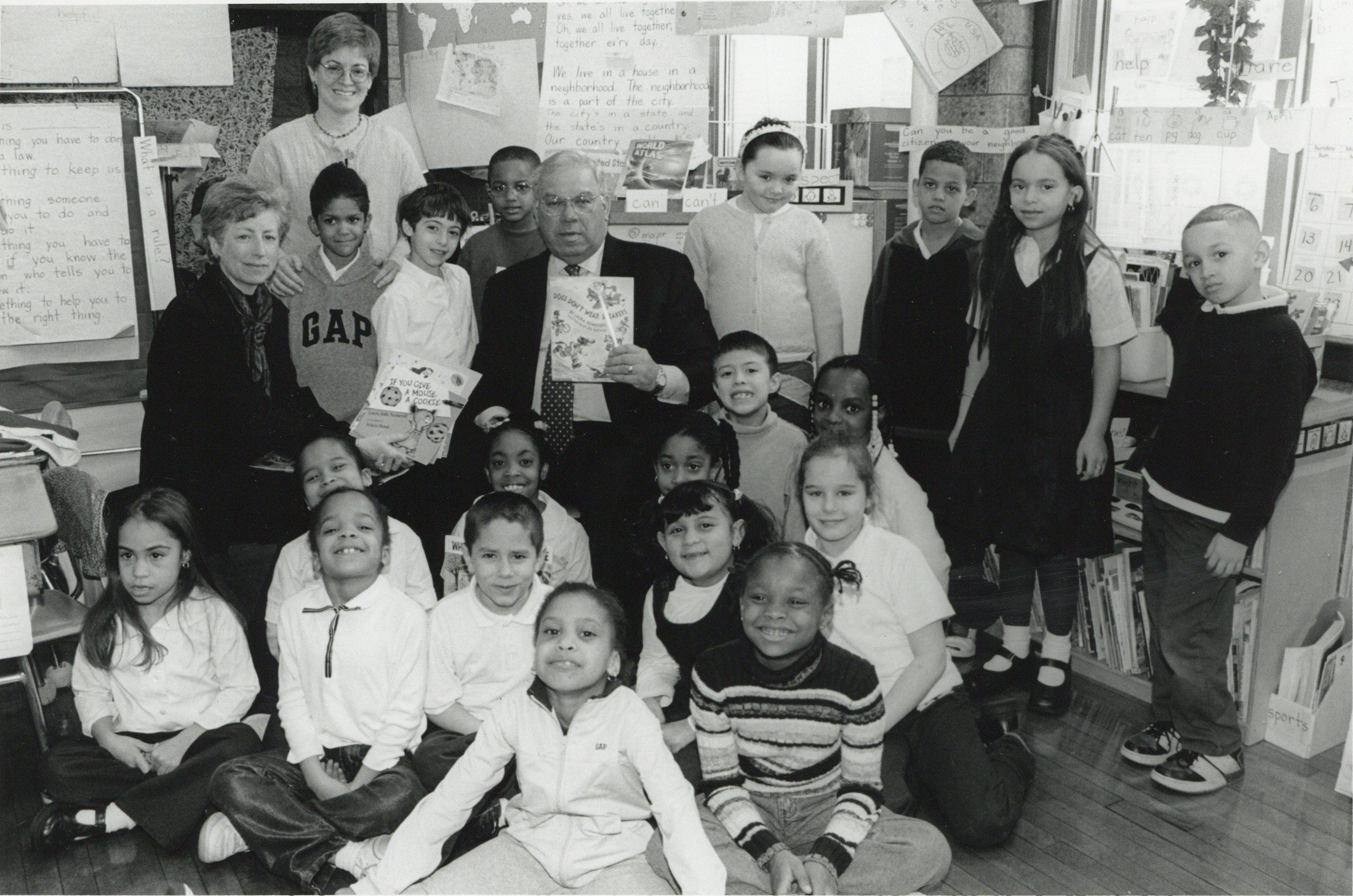
Menino with school children

Student performance in Boston Public Schools made improvements during Menino's tenure in regards to test scores. However, Menino was resistant to many school reforms, despite having promised to overhaul the schools.

Menino long opposed publicly funded tuition vouchers. In June 2009, Menino voiced support for performance pay in Boston public schools.

Menino failed in his effort to lengthen school days, meeting resistance from the Boston Teachers Union.

=== Charter schools ===
For years, Menino's position on charter schools was one of opposition. Shortly after taking office, Menino collaborated with leadership of the Boston Teachers' Union to establish pilot schools, which they had hoped would compete against charter schools. In 2005, Menino levied a threat to abandon his opposition to charter schools amid a dispute between the Boston Teachers Union and the Menino-appointed Boston School Committee.

In 2009, Menino came out in support of charter schools. In June, he came out in support of in-district charter schools. Legislation permitting these would be passed in Massachusetts in 2010. In July, he submitted state legislation which would have converted Boston's lowest-performing public schools into charter schools. At the time, he stated that he planned, if the legislation failed, to lobby for the state to raise its cap on charter schools, something which Governor Deval Patrick was pursuing at the time. At this time, he praised what he proclaimed to be charter schools' ability to attract quality teachers, arrange lessons to fit students' needs, and establish flexibile workplace rules. However, even then, Menino's support for charter schools was described by The Boston Globe's James Vaznis as, "tepid". In January 2013, Meino urged the state to remove limits on charter schools in underperforming school districts, and to also enhance the authority of school administrators to inteverne in troubled schools.

== Public safety and law enforcement ==
During Menino's tenure, crime in Boston fell to record lows, and the city came to rank among the United States' safest large cities. Boston's violent crime rate fell from 1,957.7 in 1993, to 845.2 in 2011.

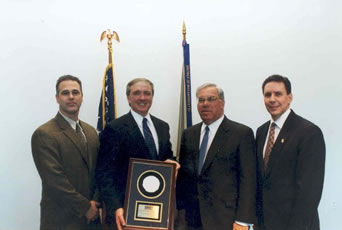
Menino accepting the United States Department of Justice's "Outstanding Comprehensive Strategic Plan" award in 2003 on behalf of the Boston city government, with United States Attorney Michael Sullivan presenting the award. The award was given to Boston's Operation Ceasefire program

Menino took office amid the "Boston Miracle", a successful joint effort by police, churches, and neighborhood groups which worked to decrease youth-on-youth violence. At the start of his tenure, Boston was experiencing a 29-month long period in which no teenagers were murdered in the city. This ended on December 11, 1997, when a sixteen year old was murdered in Dorcester. Menino supported Operation Ceasefire, which is credited with decreasing homicide rate in the city. In 2003, the Operation Ceasefire program received the United States Department of Justice's "Outstanding Comprehensive Strategic Plan Award".

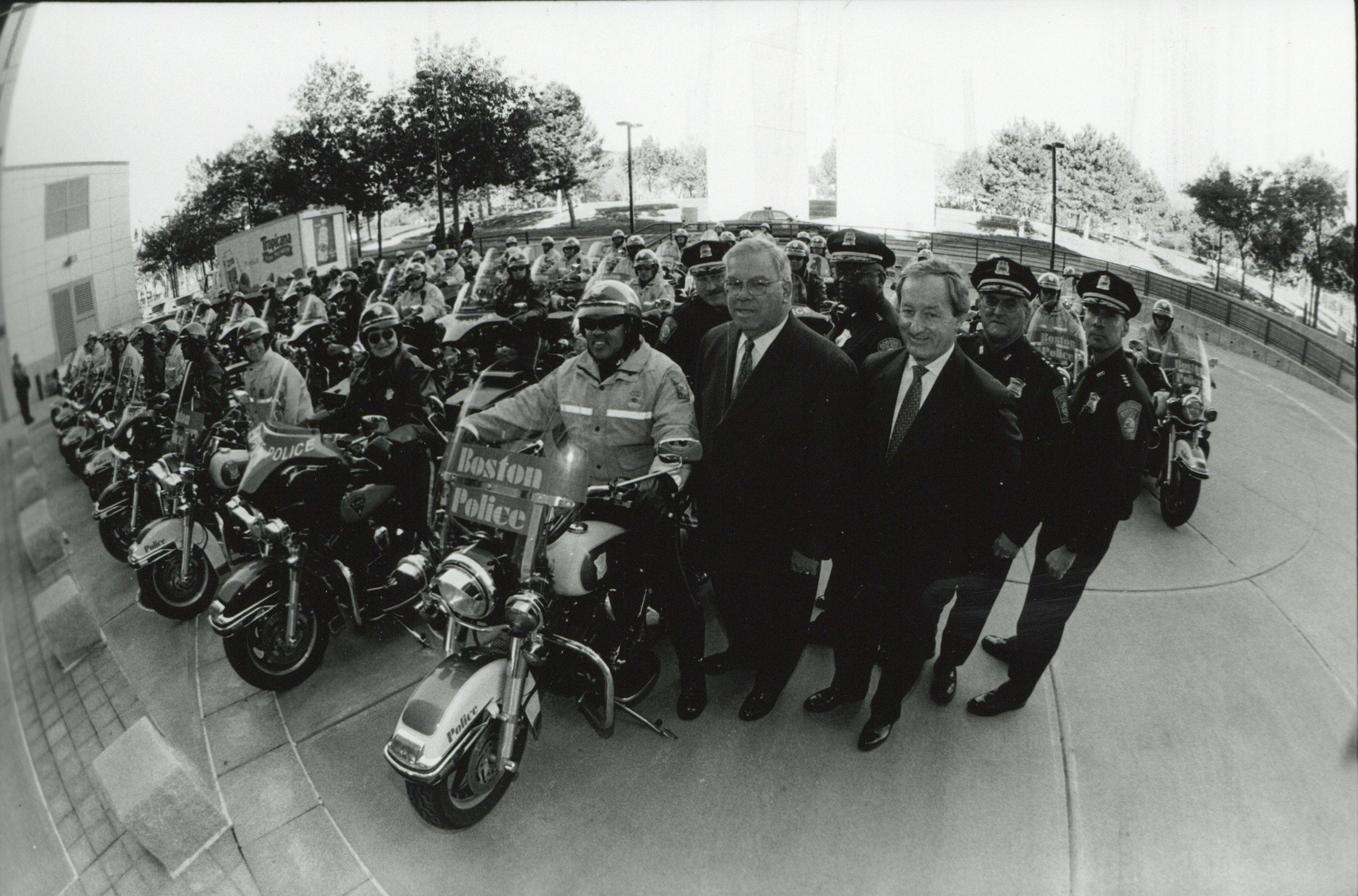
Menino with members of the Boston Police Department

In November 2003, Menino appointed James M. Hussey as acting police commissioner, following the departure of Commissioner Paul F. Evans. In 2004, Menino appointed Kathleen O'Toole as the first-ever woman to serve as commissioner of the Boston Police Department. In May 2006, Menino appointed Albert Goslin to serve as interim police commissioner following O'Toole's departure. In December 2006, Menino appointed Ed Davis to serve as police commissioner. In November 2013, Menino appointed William B. Evans to serve as interim police commissioner following Davis' departure.

In October 2011, controversy arose surrounding Menino's decision to evict members of the Occupy Boston protest on the Rose Kennedy Greenway. Menino later commented that "I sympathize with their issues, some of those issues we really have to look at in America, but when it comes to civil disobedience I will not tolerate civil disobedience in the city of Boston." On December 10, 2011, Menino oversaw a peaceful removal of Occupy Boston's tent city from Dewey Square. The encampment had been running for seventy days before this. The removal of it occurred peacefully.

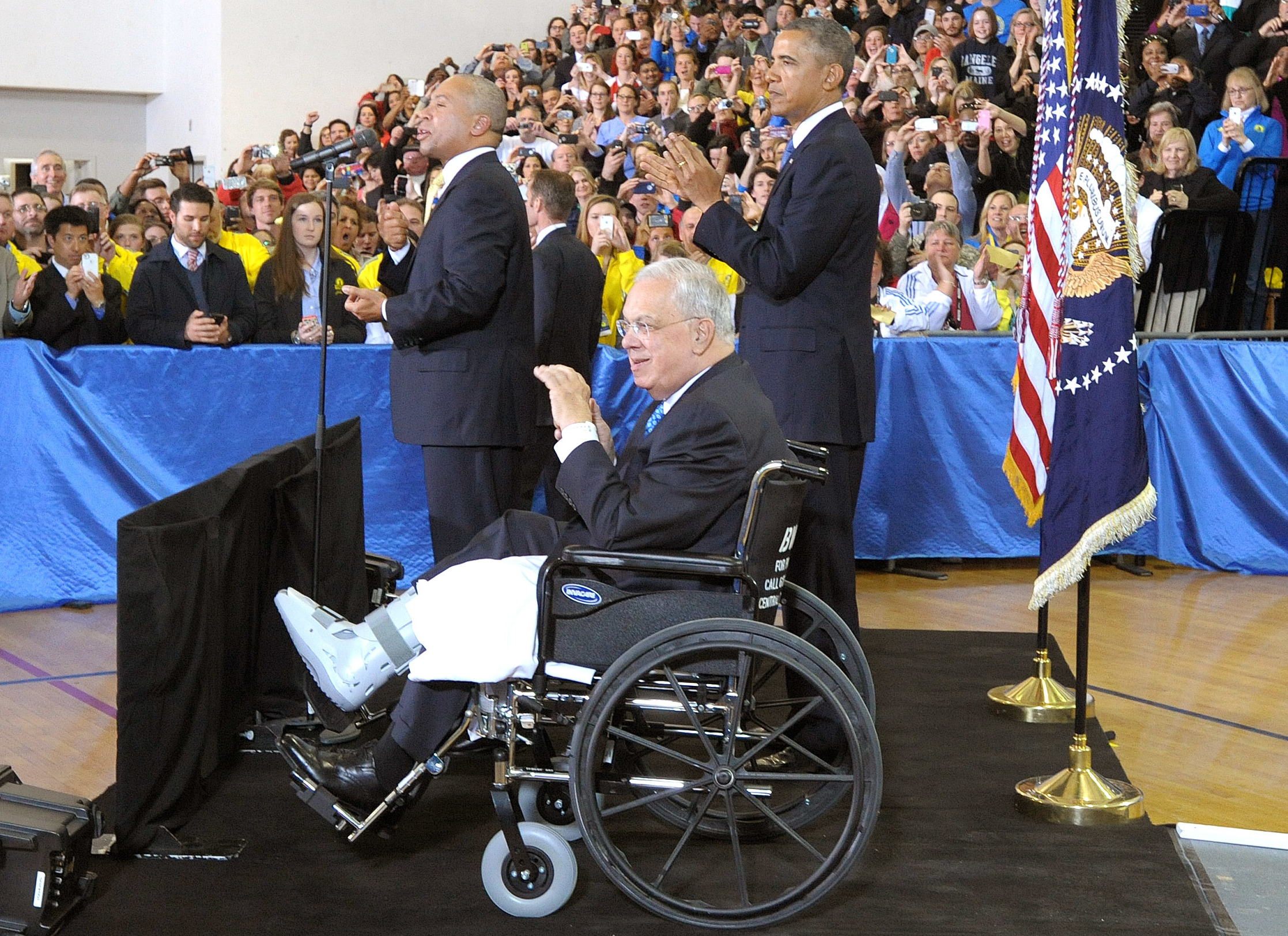
Menino, with Governor Deval Patrick and President Barack Obama at an event following the Boston Marathon Bombing

In his last year in office, the Boston Marathon bombing took place. Menino, who had been recovering in the hospital from a leg fracture he had been hospitalized for three days prior to the attacks (confining him to a wheelchair), checked himself out of the hospital against the advice of his doctor in order to attend to the aftermath of the attacks and be present at the city's initial press conference after the attack. Three days after the attack, at an interfaith service, Menino lifted himself out of the wheelchair to stand and declared, "We are one Boston. No adversity, no challenge, nothing can tear down the resilience in the heart of the city and its people."

== Public health ==
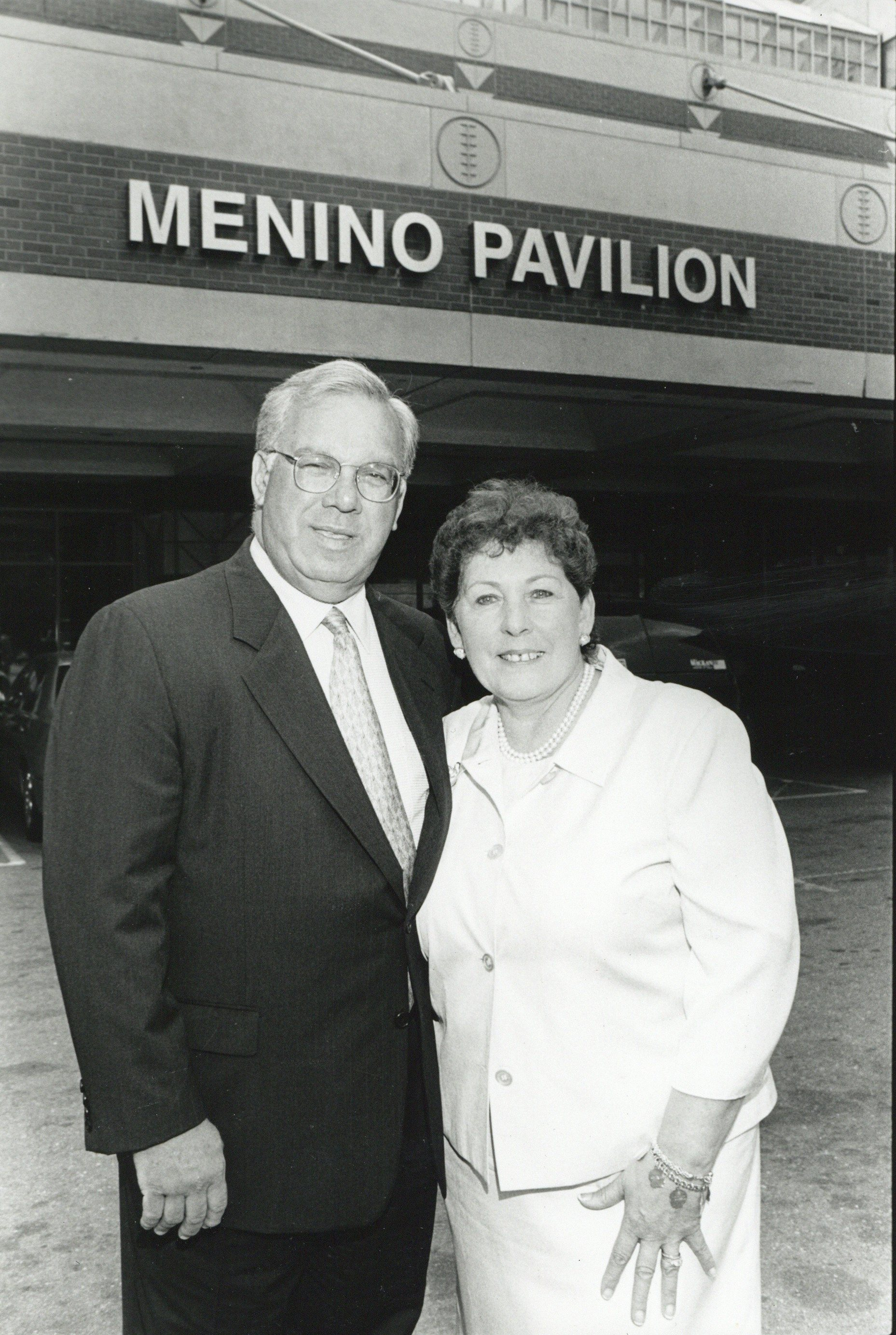
Menino and his wife, Angela, pose outside of the Menino Pavilion (named for him) at the Boston Medical Center in 2002

Menino oversaw negotiations that led to the January 1996 merger of the Boston City Hospital (which had been declining, and was in financial trouble) with the BU Medical Center. This merger had been arranged with the aim of improving healthcare for the city's more impoverished residents. This merger resulted in the establishment of the privatized Boston Medical Center. Menino had, as a city councilor, previously given support to the idea of reorganizing the Boston City Hospital. The Menino Pavilion at the Boston Medical Center would later be named for him, crediting his efforts on public health.

In the early 2000s, Menino was an early supporter of efforts to pass a statewide ban in Massachusetts on smoking in indoor workplaces. In 2012, Boston became Massachusetts' first large city, as well as the largest city in the United States, to ban smoking in public housing.

As he had during his tenure on the Boston City Council, Menino supported needle exchange programs as mayor.

In 2005, Menino created an $1 million effort to track ethnic and racial disparities in healthcare, and to collaborate with hospitals and other health providers to address these.

In 2008 Menino publicly criticized drugstore chains for failing to open clinics in the city of Boston. The state of Massachusetts had moved to permit drugstores to open clinics, and while many had opened in the suburbs, none had opened in the city of Boston.

In 2004, in an effort to fight childhood obesity, Menino banned sodas from Boston Public Schools. In April 2011, in a similar effort to fight obesity, Menino banned advertisements and sales of sugar-heavy drinks in municipal buildings and at city-sponsored events.

== Environmental issues ==
In 2008, Boston was ranked as the third-greenest city in the United States by Popular Science. In the previous decade, there had been new initiatives around planting more trees in the city, single-stream recycling, increasing the solar power capacity of the city, investing in alternative energy, and biking. One of the most innovative ideas has been green building zoning, which requires large-scale private construction to be "green" by LEED standards. Boston is the first city to revise its building code to ensure green construction.

Menino was a founding members of the US Mayors' Alliance for Green Schools.

Under Menino, Boston became the first major city in the United States to incorporate green building standards in its zoning codes. Boston changed its zoning codes to require private construction larger than 50,000 square feet to adhere to the U.S. Green Building Council's LEED standards.

Under Menino, Boston partnered with other government agencies and local businesses to accomplish its goals of reducing greenhouse gas emissions by 7% below 1990 levels by 2012, and to 80% below 1990 levels by 2050.

Menino released an updated Climate Action Plan for the City of Boston on Earth Day 2011. The major goals of the climate plan included reducing community greenhouse emissions 25% by 2020 and 80% by 2050, including projected climate change into all formal planning and project review processes, encouraging community climate action and leadership, and creating green jobs.

In May 2013, Menino launched Greenovate Boston, a community-driven movement aiming to achieve Menino's goal of an 80% reduction in greenhouse-gas emissions by 2050, as outlined in his 2011 climate action plan.

== Transportation ==
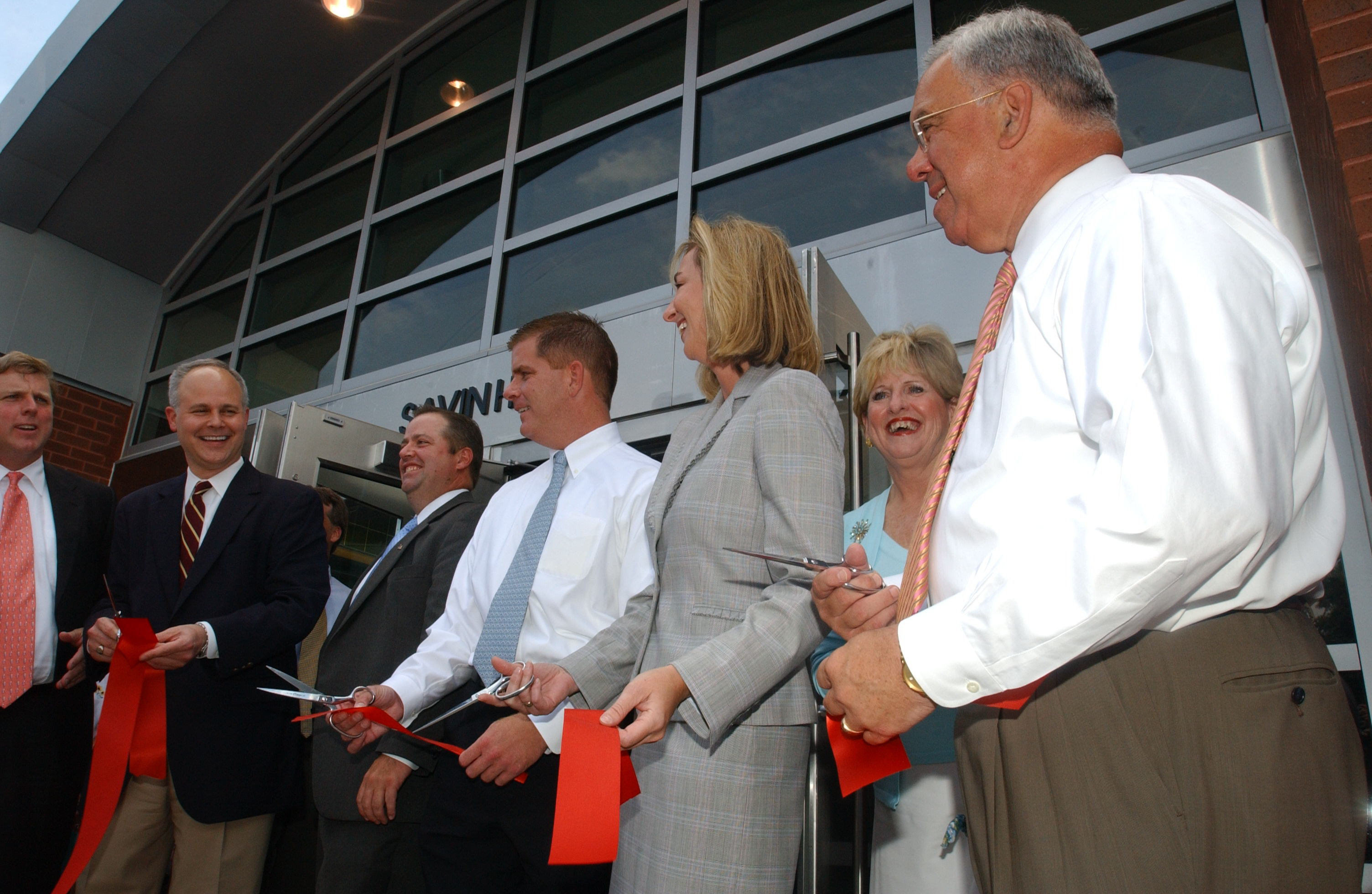
Menino (far right) attending the August 2005 ribbon cutting ceremony for the renovated Savin Hill station. Menino is joined (from left to right) by Boston City Council President Michael F. Flaherty, Massachusetts Secretary of Transportation Daniel Grabauskas, State Senator Jack Hart, State Representative Marty Walsh, Lieutenant Governor Kerry Healy, and Boston City Councilor Maureen Feeney

In July 2009, Menino gave his support to the proposed Route 28X MBTA bus which state transit officials had proposed to enhance the heavily used Route 28 bus. This plan would have seen dedicated busways created in the median of Blue Hill Avenue and bus lanes on Warren Street, establishing a bus rapid transit line for Route 28. The plan was ultimately shelved.

In 2011, Menino proposed MBTA ferry service between East Boston and Fan Pier on the South Boston Waterfront. In August 2012, the Federal Highway Administration awarded $1.28 million to the city for the purchase of two boats. In September 2012, the Boston Redevelopment Authority accepted the grant and agreed to rehabilitate the East Boston Marine Terminal for the ferries, which were then expected to begin operation in 2013. Service was later moved to an expected 2014 launch. However, the plans for ferry service would stall during the mayoralty of Menino's successor Marty Walsh, due to the grant for such service not being enough to cover what proved to be the actual costs of acquiring two new boats. Ultimately, such a service would not be launched until September 2021.

In October 2013, with traffic becoming a problem in the city's Innovation District, Menino and Massachusetts Department of Transportation Secretary Richard A. Davey jointly announced a number of planned changes aimed at quelling this. This included the installation of "time to destination" message signs intended at informing drivers of when to avoid taking routes through the district, pedestrian enhancements, re-striping the Evelyn Moakley Bridge's surface to direct motorists towards Interstate 93, "smart parking" sendsors to allow mobile applications to help drivers find vacant parking spaces, and the South Boston–East Boston ferry service (with plans for such service to be launched the following year).

Menino was mayor for most of the years of the Big Dig, a state-run megaproject overseen by the Massachusetts Turnpike Authority. In March 2005, with the Big Dig facing significant cost overruns and other troubles, Menino wrote to Harvard University President Lawrence Summers to request that he and Massachusetts Institute of Technology President Susan Hockfield assist in evaluating the project's management and finances.

In 2012, Menino commented against the state's plans to replace the Monsignor William J. Casey Overpass in Jamaica Plain, saying that he would preferred them to instead reconstruct the overpass with a park below it. He negatively referred to the planned demolition as a "second Big Dig" (in reference to the Big Dig's difficulties).

=== Bicycling ===
Three times between the years 1999 and 2006, Boston was ranked by Bicycling magazine as one of the worst cities in the United States for bicycling. In, September 2007, Menino started a bicycle program called Boston Bikes with a goal of improving bicycling conditions by adding bike lanes and racks and offering bikeshare programs. By hosting events and creating a bike-friendly landscape throughout the city, the initiative encourages residents and tourists to explore the city by bicycle. Olympic cyclist Nicole Freedman headed the program for several years. By the end of Menino's tenure, the city had 120 miles of bicycling paths, and had roughly 1,000 Hubway bike sharing cycles.

== Arts and culture ==
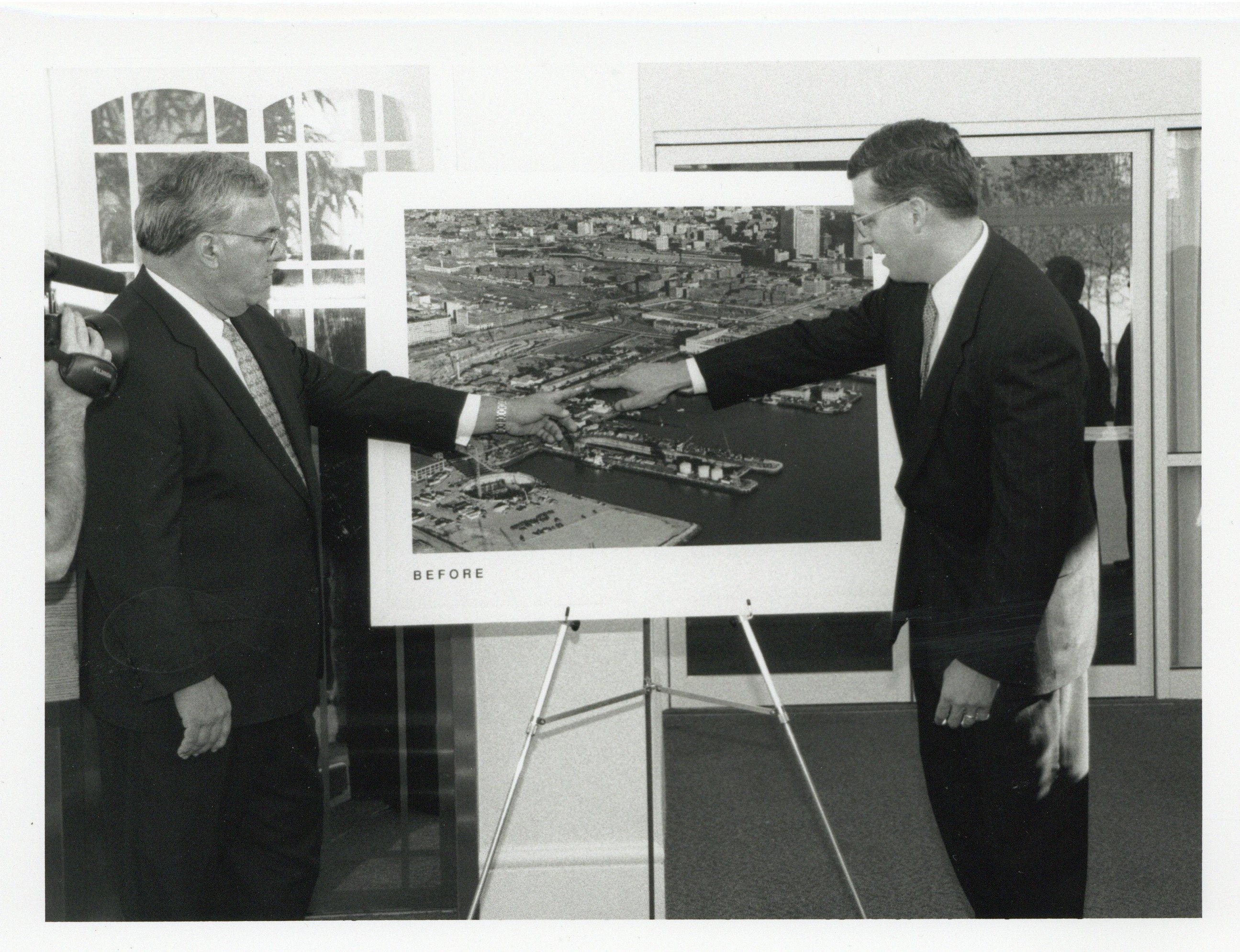
Menino and Thomas N. O'Brien unveiling plans for a new Harborlights Pavilion in South Boston on October 19, 1998

In the late 1990s, after the operator of the Harborlights Pavilion was evicted from the venue's original location at Fan Pier, Menino and Boston Redevelopment Authority head Thomas N. O'Brien worked to find a new location on the city's waterfront for the venue.

Menino was an important supporter of the revitalization of Dorcester's Strand Theatre. Menino's administration began working to revitalize the venue in 2005, in hopes of making it a local cultural attraction to draw crowds to the area. The city failed to find development partners, and instead spent $6.2 million of its own money on capital improvements to the venue, transforming it into a youth arts and performance center managed by Boston's cultural affairs office.

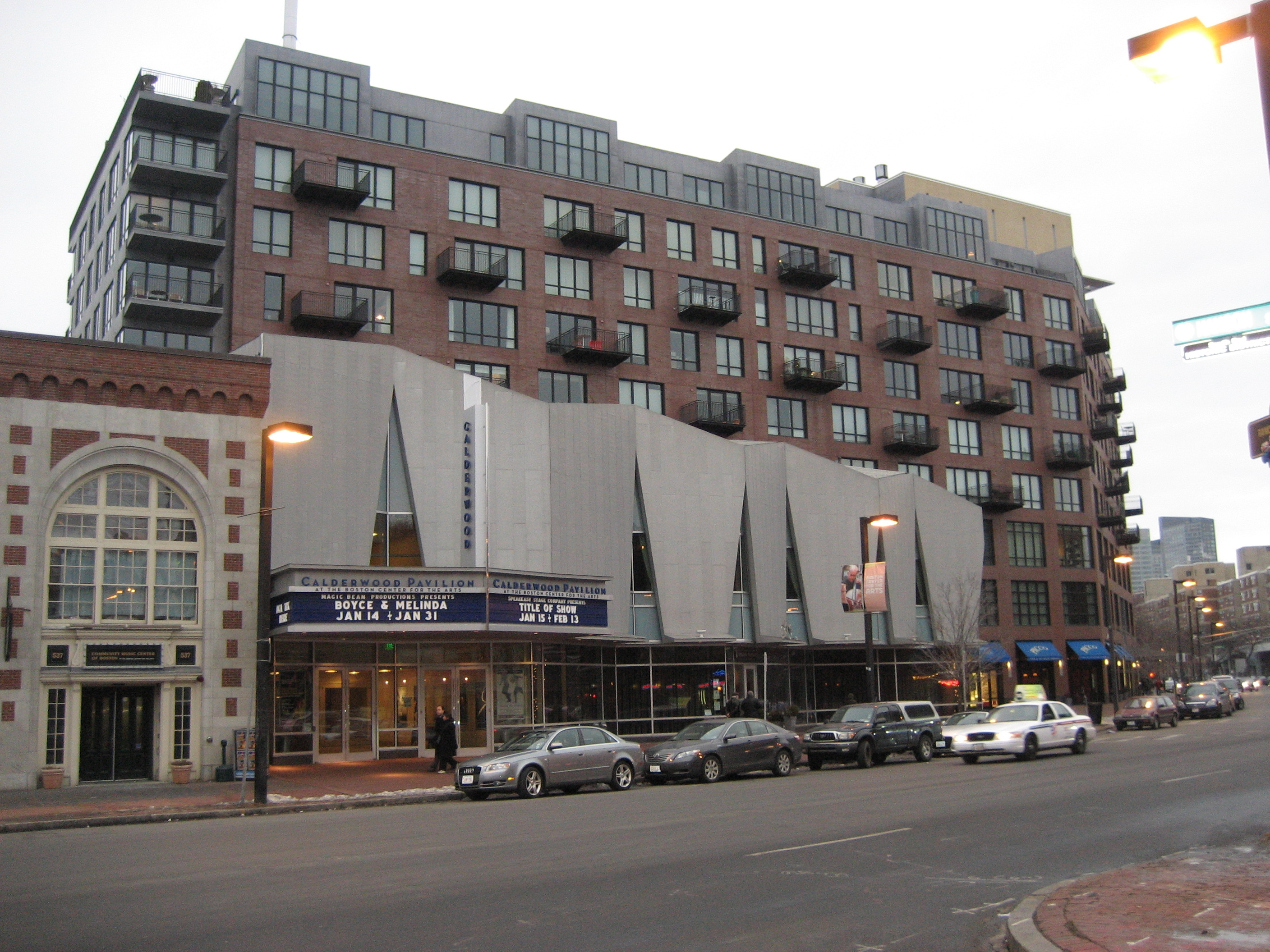
Menino was a supporter of the construction of the Calderwood Pavilion, and negotiated the deal which led to its construction

Menino was an important supporter of the construction of the Calderwood Pavilion. Menino negotiated the deal between the Boston Center for the Arts and the Druker Company in which the Druker Company agreed to build the "shell and core" of a performing arts venue as part of its Atelier/505 luxury mixed-use condo development. Support from the city and its Boston Redevelopment Authority were critical to the construction of the venue.

Menino gave some financial assistance and in kind services to support the Commonwealth Shakespeare Company's free performances of the works of William Shakespeare on the Boston Common.

In 2003, Menino relaunched the Boston Arts Festival.

Menino supported the construction of a new home for the Institute of Contemporary Art at Fan Pier.

Menino created a position of city poet laureate, installing Samuel James Cornish as the first holder of this position in 2008.

In 2010, Menino's administration launched the Payments in Lieu of Taxes (PILOT) program, which asked the city's largest nonprofits to make voluntary payments equal to roughly 25% of what they had to pay if they lacked non-profit status in taxable property on properties worth $15 million or more. The program aimed to assist the city in offsetting the rising cost of municipal services and the loss of state financial aid due to cuts. Among the nonprofits that were asked to participate were ten cultural groups. The Boston Symphony Orchestra and the public radio station WGBH agreed to participate in the program. The Boston Museum of Fine Arts complained about the program, and instead contributed only one-fifth the amount that the city had asked it to contribute. The remaining seven cultural groups disregarded the city's request. This program was ultimately seen as straining Menino's relations with many of the city's major cultural relationships.

At the end of his tenure, Menino supported the creation of the Boston Calling Music Festival.

During Menino's tenure, the city had regularly ranked towards the bottom five among the United States' 30 largest cities in regards to the total amount of funds that it spent annually on arts, per data collected by Americans for the Arts. The budget of the Mayor's Office of Arts, Tourism, and Special Events was roughly $1.1 million in 2013. Maureen Dezell of WBUR attributed the city's relatively low art budget to Massachusetts state laws restricting the revenue sources of the state's cities and towns, leaving the city with fewer sources of revenue than other United States cities.

=== Revitalization of Washington Street theaters ===
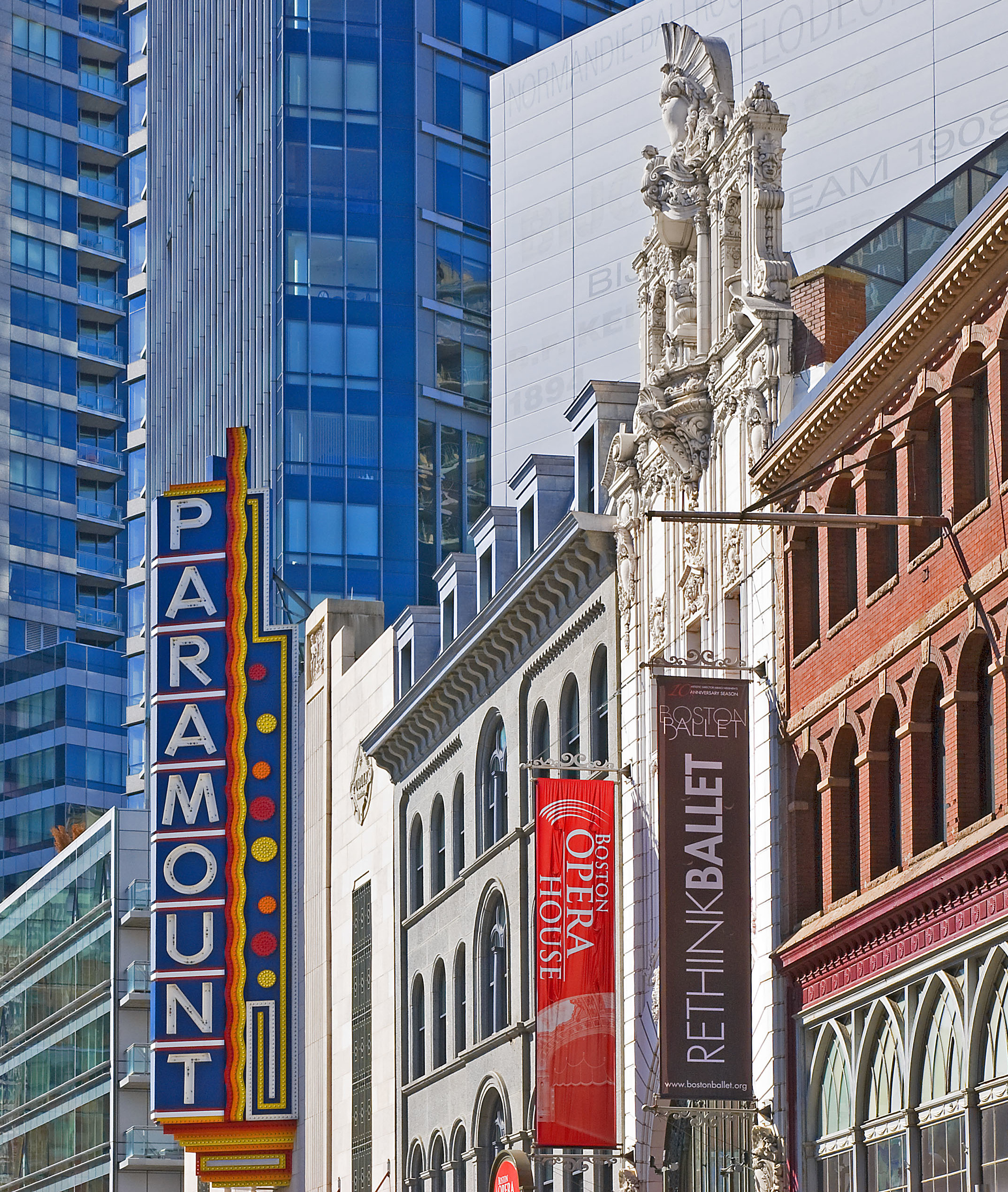
Menino was involved in the renovation of several performing arts venues in the city, included the Boston Opera House and the Paramount Theatre (both pictured)

Menino was an important supporter of efforts to renovate the Boston Opera House, Modern Theatre, and Paramount Theatre. In 1995, Menino started a challenging effort to save the three physically deteriorating venues, all located in what was regarded to be a disreputable area at the time. Menino championed the renovation of these theatres as a means to revitalize Washington Street. Menino successfully lobbied the National Trust for Historic Preservation to list the three venues among the nation's eleven most endangered landmarks in 1995.

In 1996, David Anderson, the head of Pace Theatrical, expressed his interest in renovating the Boston Opera House. Clear Channel Entertainment Theatrical, which Anderson had become head of, ultimately acquired the Boston Opera House. Their renovation effort was complicated by opposition from some neighbors, who sued the city in 2000 to block the revitalization of the venue. This litigation lasted two years. Menino worked to keep the developers from backing out of the project while litigation ensued. The city fast tracked zoning, permitting, and other approval. In November 2002, Clear Channel received a building permit to begin restoration on the Boston Opera House. Clear Channel undertook a $54 million renovation of the historic venue which reopened in July 2004.

In 2002, the city successfully convinced the developers of the Ritz Carlton being constructed a block away from the Paramount Center to pay for restoration to the venue's façade and marquee. The city later signed an agreement with Emerson College to redevelop it into the Paramount Center, which opened in 2010. In 2011, the Modern Theatre was reopened by Suffolk University.

== Food policy ==
Early into his tenure, Menino promised to help open more grocery stores in low-income neighborhoods, in order to combat food deserts. Among other actions, Menino would, during his tenure, use city funding and American Reinvestment and Recovery Act funding to catalyze the establishment of grocery stores. In 2012, Menino's administration claimed that he had been responsible for the addition of over 26 supermarkets since taking office.

In 2004, in an effort to fight childhood obesity, Menino banned sodas from Boston Public Schools. In April 2011, in a similar effort to fight obesity, Menino banned advertisements and sales of sugar-heavy drinks in municipal buildings and at city-sponsored events. At the time, Menino expressed his desire, "to create a civic environment that makes the healthier choice the easier choice in people's lives, whether it's schools, worksites, or other places in the community."

In 2008, Meino co-founded, with the Food Project, the Boston Bounty Bucks porogram, which offers a dollar-for-dollar match of up to $10 for individuals utilizing Supplemental Nutrition Assistance Program (SNAP/"food stamp") benefits at farmers markets, per each visit to participating famers markets.

In November 2010, Menino launched the Urban Agriculture Initiative, which piloted urban agriculture at two city-owned pieces of land in Dorchester. Also in 2010, Menino appointed the Mayor's Urban Agriculture Working Group to work with the Boston Office of Food Initiatives (which had also been established that year) and the Department of Neighborhood Development to assist the Boston Redevelopment Authority in establishing new zoning laws to allow for urban agriculture. Not many types of agricultural activities were addressed by the existing zoning code, and activities not identified by the zoning code are considered forbidden uses in Boston, therefore requiring an appeal through the Inspectional Service Department's Zoning Board of Appeals. Article 89 was ultimately developed to address urban agriculture zoning matters, and city passed Article 89 into law in December 2013.

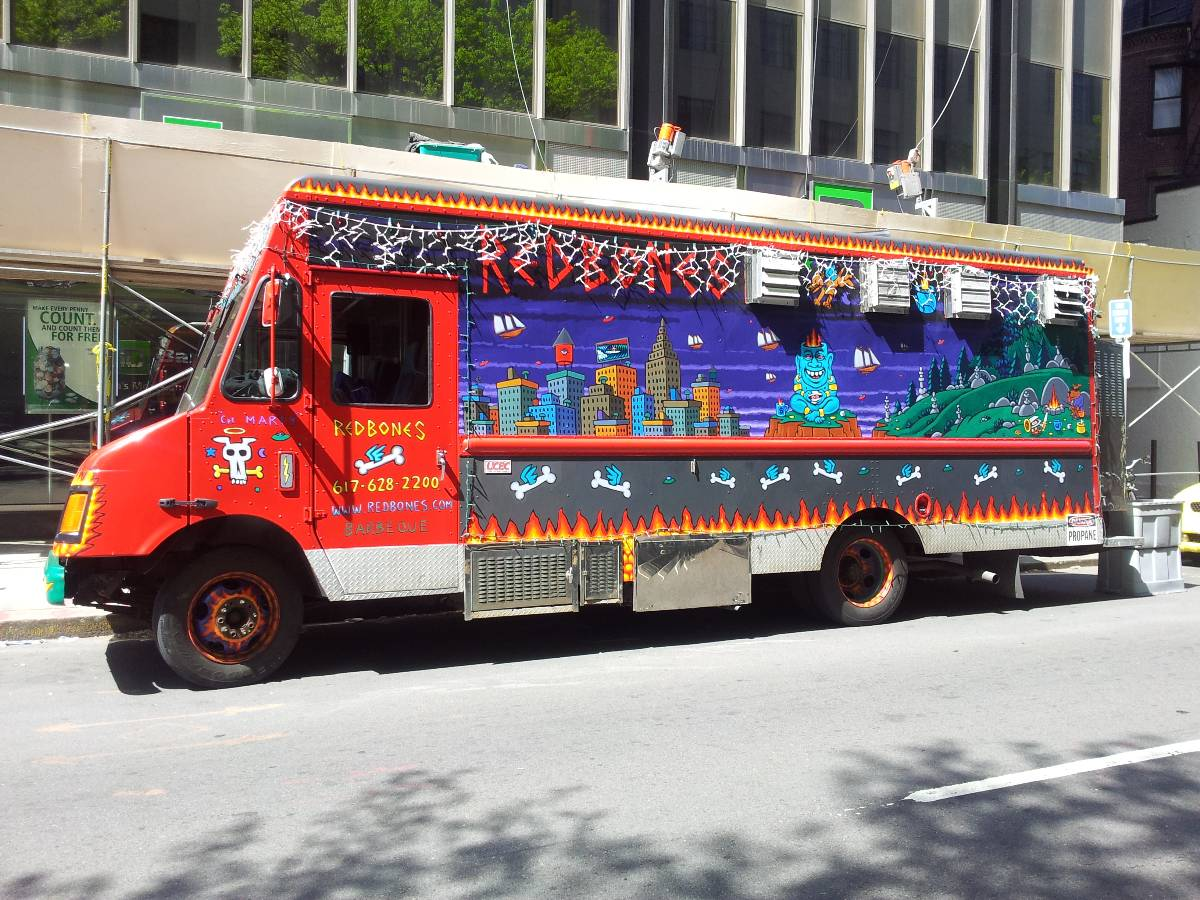
A food truck in Boston in 2012, the year after the passage of the Mobile Food Truck Ordinance

Menino collaborated with the Boston City Council to pass the Mobile Food Truck Ordinance in April 2011. This ordinance allowed food trucks to operate on the streets of Boston.

In 2012, recognizing Menino's success with food and nutrition initiatives in Boston, the United States Conference of Mayors made him chair of their Food Policy Task Force.

== Other ==
Started in 1994, the Mayor's Youth Council, which consisted of high school students representing each of the city's fifteen neighborhoods, met with Menino twice a month to discuss youth issues in the city of Boston.

In 2012, Menino vetoed two consecutive City Council-approved maps for redistricting. There was controversy regarding the maps' impact on racial distribution among constituencies. Menino approved a third map that had amendments by City Councilor Tito Jackson.

In 2002, the FBI opened a corruption probe into Menino, which it ultimately closed without any charges. The probe was in response to a Boston Herald article which questioned the appropriateness of comments Menino was shown making during a segment on the television series Boston 24/7. The comments showed Menino appearing to threaten a Sprint Corporation attorney that he would award a Boston Housing Authority contract to their competitor AT&T because AT&T had sponsored a summer youth program for the city, while Sprint had failed to take similar initiative. Menino defended these comments as a "joke". The Boston Globe found there was no actual telecommunications contracts that were up for bid when Menino made these comments.

Criticism of Menino included accusations that he took actions as mayor that benefited his supporters and punished his foes. Menino, known to hold grudges, did not sky away from publicly calling out perceived political enemies.

== Public image ==
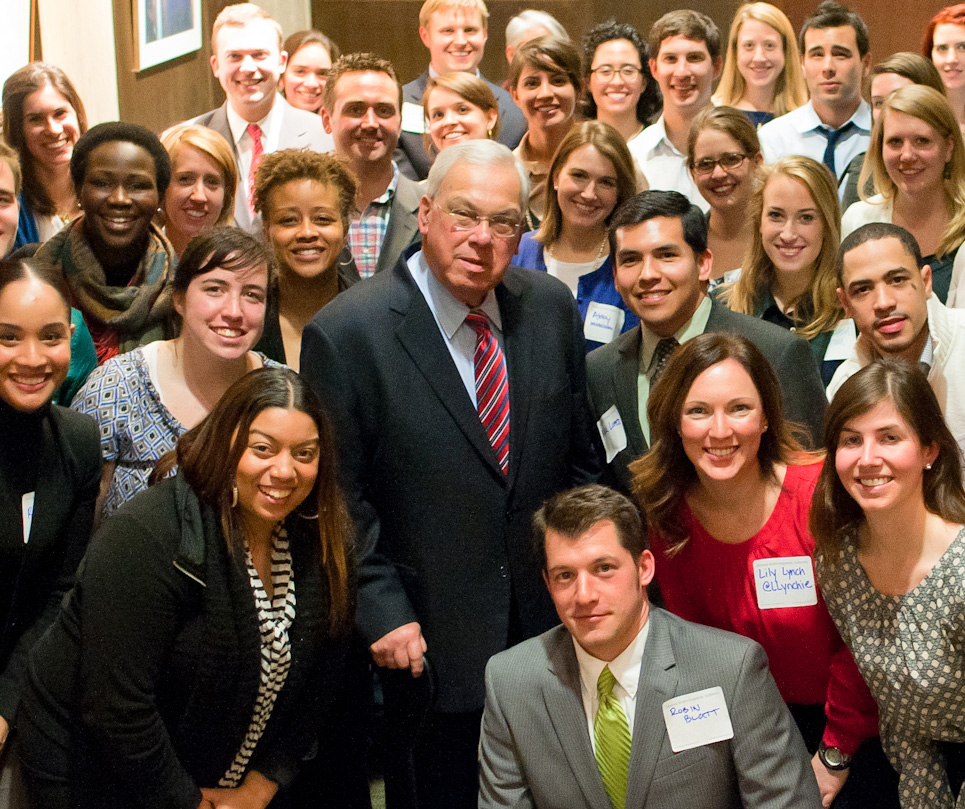
Menino in 2013

Menino enjoyed strong popularity. Menino's perennial popularity garnered him the tongue-in-cheek epithet "Mayor for Life." In July 2012, it was reported that Menino had an 82% approval rating.

Menino made appearances at community events, such as parades and community meetings. Surveys, such ones conducted in April 2008, in May 2009, and March 2013 for The Boston Globe by the University of New Hampshire Survey Center, showed that, at one point, more than half of the city's residents had reported having at one point personally met Menino, an immense share of residents for a big city mayor.

Menino, who famously was dubbed, and even styled himself, as an "urban mechanic", had a reputation for focusing strongly on "nuts and bolts" issues. The "urban mechanic" nickname had both positive and negative connotations to it. He had been given this nickname in late 1994.

=== Approval polling ===
Menino enjoyed high approval ratings among Boston residents.

In March 2013, a Boston Globe poll not only showed Menino with a strong approval rating, but also found that nearly three-fourths of respondents believed that the city was heading in the "right direction".

Segment polled	Polling group	Date	Approve	Disapprove	Sample size	Margin-of-error	Polling method	Source
Adults	University of Massachusetts Amherst/The Boston Globe	August 2013	82% ^{α}	8%		± 6.2%		
Likely voters	Suffolk University/Boston Herald	July 10–15, 2013	82%	12%	600			
Adults	University of New Hampshire/The Boston Globe	March 20–26, 2013	74.1% ^{[β]}	15.9%	440	± 4.7%	Telephone (landline and cell phones)	
Adults	University of New Hampshire/The Boston Globe	April 30–May 6, 2009	73%	19%	508	± 4.4%		
Adults	University of New Hampshire/The Boston Globe	April 12–17, 2008	72%	20%	519	± 4.4%		
Likely voters	The Boston Globe/WBZ-TV	October 15–20, 2005	66%		513	± 4.4%		
		2001	85%					
Residents	KRC Communications Research/The Boston Globe	July 5–6, 2000	77%	7%		± 5%		
	Mass Insight Corp.	2000	79%					
	The Boston Globe	1998	71%					
		1997	74%					
Likely voters	Marttila & Kiley	September 25–28, 1995	80%	16%	500			
Likely voters	KRC Communications Research/The Boston Globe/WBZ-TV	October 19–20, 1993	70%	12%	400	± 5%	Telephone	

==== Notes on polls ====
^α 52% strongly approve, 30% somewhat approve, 5% somewhat disapprove, 3% strongly disapprove
^β 39.8% strongly approve, 31.3% somewhat approve, 3.0% lean towards approval, 2.1% lean toward disapproval, 8.0% somewhat disapprove, 5.8% strongly disapprove

== See also ==
- Timeline of Boston, 1990s–2010s
- Other Boston mayoralties:
  - Mayoralty of Raymond Flynn
  - Mayoralty of Marty Walsh
  - Mayoralty of Michelle Wu

Political offices
Preceded by Raymond L. Flynn (tenure)	Mayor of Boston, Massachusetts; November 16, 1993 – January 6, 2014	Succeeded by Marty Walsh (tenure)
