= Jason Bedrick =

American politician (born 1983)

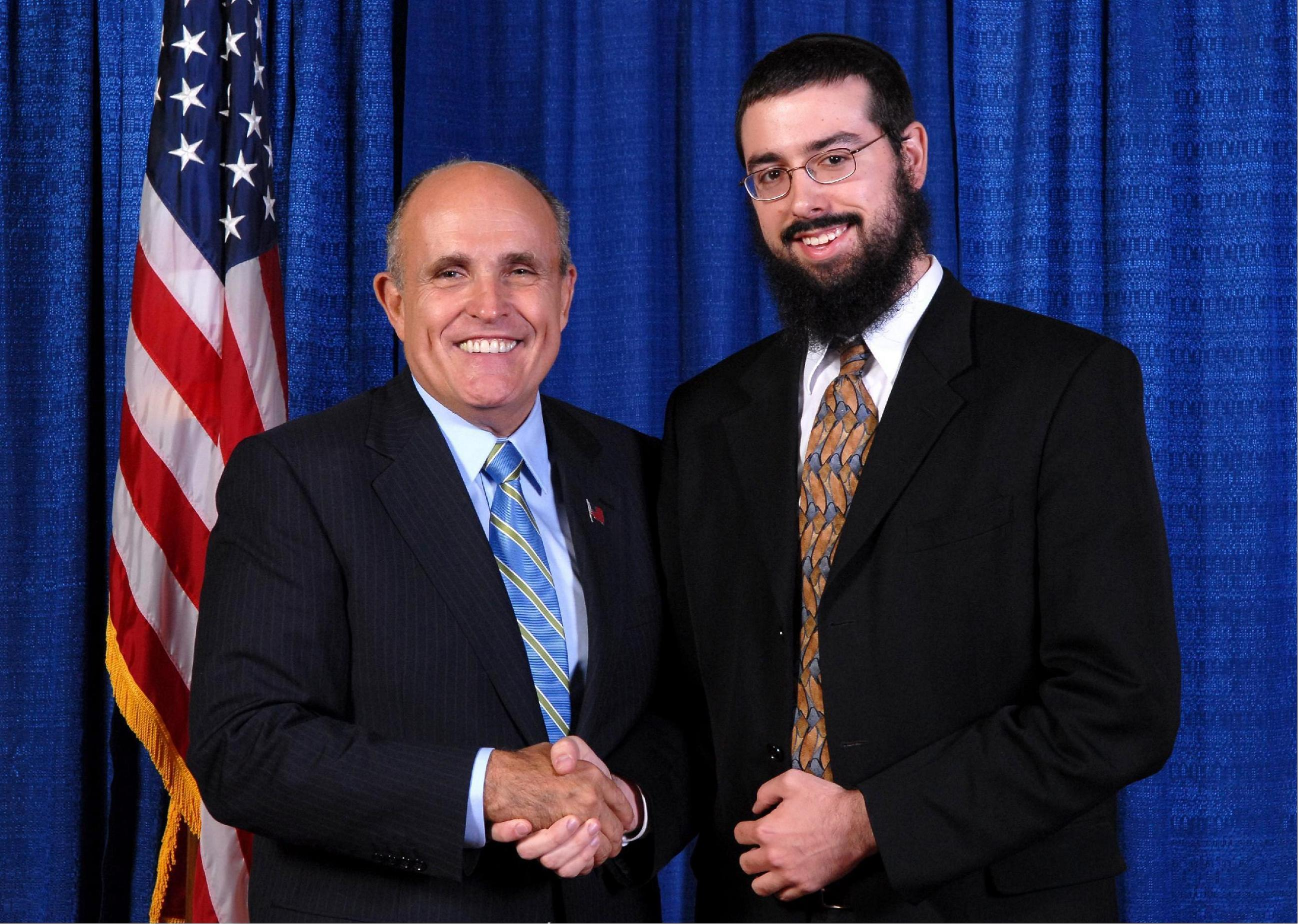
Bedrick with Rudy Giuliani in 2006

Jason Bedrick (born June 5, 1983) is a former member of the New Hampshire state legislature. He was a Republican representing Windham, New Hampshire. He is a research fellow at The Heritage Foundation and an adjunct scholar at the Cato Institute's Center for Educational Freedom, where he was previously a policy analyst. Bedrick holds a Master's in Public Policy from Harvard Kennedy School at Harvard University.

Bedrick is the first Orthodox Jew to hold elective office in New Hampshire, which has fewer than ten Orthodox Jewish families among its 1% Jewish population.

== Early life and education ==
Bedrick was raised in a secular Jewish home in Windham, New Hampshire, and he became religiously observant over the course of many years. He attended Bishop Guertin High School in Nashua, New Hampshire, where he received the Religious Studies Award for "the student who best understands the Christian message presented in the classroom."

After graduation, he attended Babson College, majoring in business administration. At Babson College, he was a senior editor for the Babson Free Press and founder of the local chapter of the Alpha Epsilon Pi fraternity. After college, he studied Torah in yeshiva Hadar Hatorah in Crown Heights, Brooklyn and Yeshiva Tiferes Bachurim, a part of the Rabbinical College of America in Morristown, New Jersey.

== Political positions ==
Bedrick is a strong supporter of school choice, including charter schools, education vouchers, and scholarship tax credits. He first ran for the New Hampshire State House unsuccessfully on a platform as an Independent in 2004.

Bedrick's 2006 victory was a narrow one, by only six votes, after a recount. In addition to school choice, he is in favor of continuing New Hampshire's traditional absence of sales and income tax, and is in general a fiscal conservative. Bedrick was unanimously endorsed by the libertarian Republican Liberty Caucus political action committee. The New Hampshire Liberty Alliance gave Bedrick an "A" rating in their 2007 Liberty Rating for his pro-liberty voting record and in 2008, they named him "Legislator of the Year". Bedrick scored 98% on New Hampshire House Republican Alliance legislative score card. In 2008, he endorsed Arkansas governor Mike Huckabee for president.

== New Hampshire House of Representatives ==
Bedrick was the first Orthodox Jew elected to the New Hampshire House of Representatives. He observes Shabbat and keeps kosher. Because Jewish law forbids taking oaths, during his swearing-in ceremony Bedrick substituted the words "I affirm" for "I swear." Bedrick always wears a head covering and sports a full beard.

== 2008 election ==
By a one-vote margin, 904–903, Bedrick was not renominated in 2008 to appear on the Republican ticket in the general election.
