= Bishop Guertin High School =

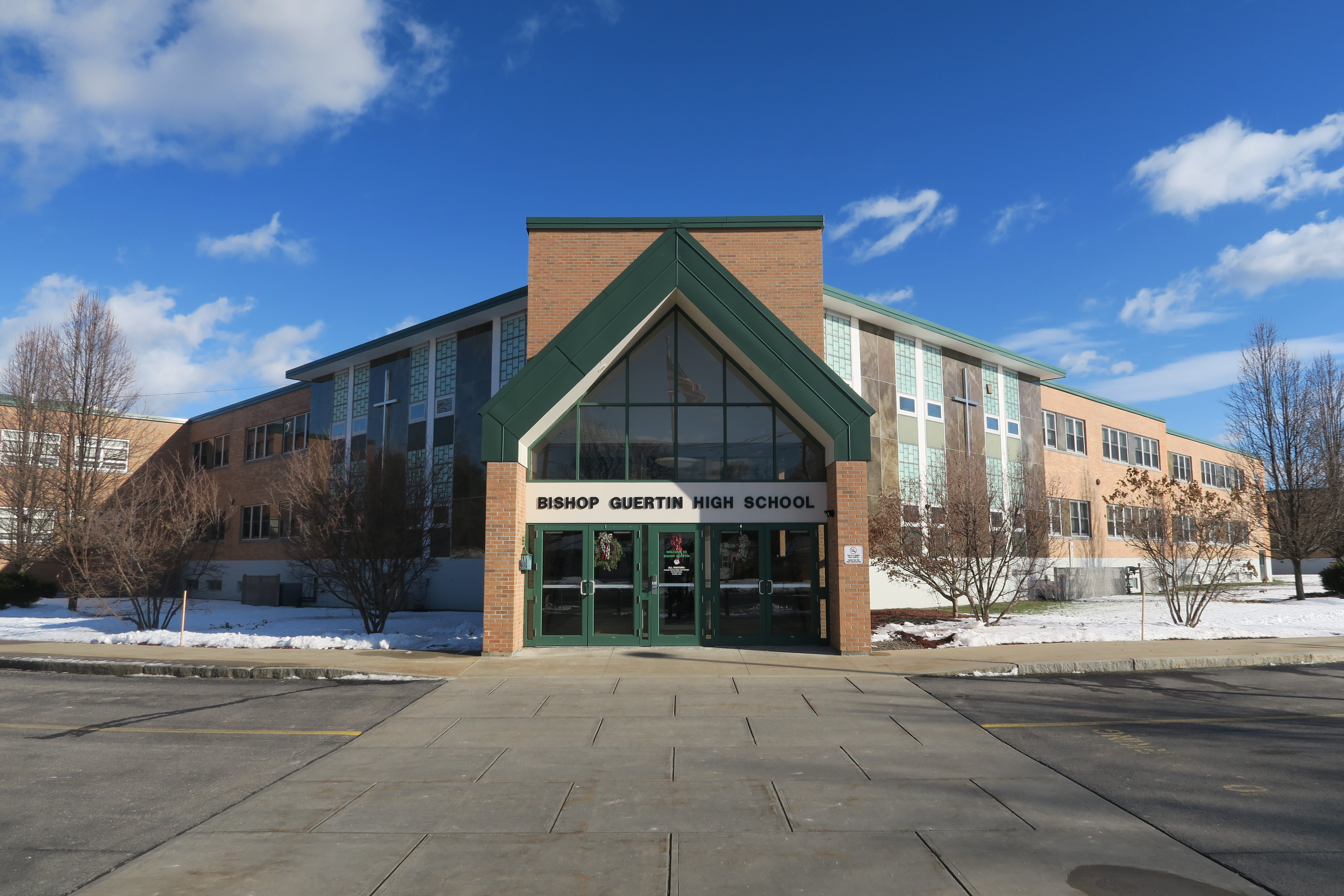
- Bishop Guertin High School

Location
- 194 Lund Road; Greater Nashua Region; Nashua, New Hampshire 03060; United States; 42°44′17″N 71°28′29″W

Information
- Type: Private, coeducational
- Motto: Scientia et Sanctitas (Knowledge and Holiness)
- Religious affiliation: Roman Catholic
- Patron saint: Father André Coindre
- Established: 1963; 63 years ago
- Founder: Brothers of the Sacred Heart
- President: Linda Brodeur
- Principal: Jason Strniste
- Faculty: 63
- Enrollment: 785 (2014–2015)
  - College Acceptance Rate: 100%
- Average class size: 19
- Student to teacher ratio: 12:1
- Campus: Suburban
- Colors: Green and gold
- Athletics conference: NHIAA Division 1
- Mascot: Cardinal
- Nickname: BG, BGHS
- Team name: Cardinals
- Accreditation: New England Association of Schools and Colleges
- Newspaper: The Nest
- Tuition: $17,500 plus $150 activity fee
- Website: www.bghs.org

Bishop Guertin (BG) is a college preparatory independent private Roman Catholic high school in Nashua, New Hampshire. Named for Bishop George Albert Guertin (1869–1931), it was founded by the Brothers of the Sacred Heart in 1963.

== Scholastics ==
Subjects are divided into nine departments: English, Social Studies, Computer Science, World Languages, Science, Mathematics, Health and Fitness, Fine Arts, and Religious Studies. Guertin students are able to take courses in these departments at the "College Preparatory", "Honors", or "Advanced Placement" level. Guertin teachers are also available for personal help and tutoring before and after school.

World Languages at Guertin are currently Latin, French, and Spanish (including 5th year of language and/or AP language); in addition to these language foundations, Ancient Greek has been recently added to the curriculum as a semester-long "Honors" elective.

Bishop Guertin offers six class periods a day, starting at 7:45 am until 2:30 pm. The class schedule varies from day to day. There is an eight-day cycle with six periods each day. For example, Day A would consist of periods A, B, C, D, E, and F. Lunch is a 30 minute block lunch during the 4th period of the day. There are 5 lunches, with the 1st lunch starting the earliest at 11:00 AM, and the 5th lunch starting the latest at 11:55 AM, both on a regular school day. The next day (called "Day G" due to the fact that class period G starts that day) would begin with period G and continue with periods H, A, B, C, and D. The schedule continues to cycle like this every day until it reaches "Day A" again and the cycle starts over. Also, if there is a snow day, hurricane day, holiday, etc. the BG students return to school the next day with the schedule planned for the missed school day.

The school has one of the highest rates of college acceptance for its students in New Hampshire, which reached an all-time high in 2015, with 100% of the graduating class accepted into at least 1 college.

== Sports ==
The Cardinals of Bishop Guertin participate in 17 sports year-round, completely in NHIAA Division I, the division reserved for the largest schools in the state. A notable exception to this is the school's football program, which was in Division II until 2013 before moving up to Division I, the second highest size division of high school football programs in the state. While Bishop Guertin is one of the smaller Division I schools in New Hampshire, its ability to draw students from a wide geographic area in southern New Hampshire and northeastern Massachusetts enables it to be highly competitive in its division.

For decades, Bishop Guertin played their crosstown public school rival, the Nashua Purple Panthers in the Turkey Bowl on Thanksgiving. In 2004, Nashua High School was split into the Panthers of South and the Titans of North, and Bishop Guertin no longer played in the Thanksgiving Day game. Exeter High School and Pinkerton Academy are two main rivals of the school.

The school won seven state titles in 2005. The school's football program won three division II state championship seasons in football with a record of 35–1 between 2004 and 2006. They again won 3 consecutive titles between 2008 and 2010. The girls indoor track team won twelve straight Class L championships, from 2003 to 2014, the boys track team won both the indoor and outdoor track championships in 2010, and the boys cross-country program won titles in 2008 and 2009, while the girls won titles in 2011 and 2014. The boys hockey team won Division I state championships in 2000 and 2001, 2007 and 2008, 2015, 2023 and again in 2026.

The boys lacrosse team won state championships in 2005, 2008, 2010–2014, 2016, 2017, and all titles from 2021-2025. The girls lacrosse team won the state championship in 2015, 2018, 2019, 2021 and 2022.

The softball team won the state championship in 2017.

== Activities ==
Popular after-school activities include the Environmental Club, Drama Club, Anime Club, Writer's Club, Ukulele Club, Mock Trial, French Club, Rock Appreciation Club, the Crossword Puzzle Club (XWC), Asian American Club, Cornerstone (a community service club), Debate Team (*program eliminated after 2016–17 school year), Band, Russian Club, Student Council, Campus Ministry Council (divided into 3 committees- Spiritual Life, Social Justice, and Christian Formation), a FIRST Robotics Competition team, and the NJCL Latin Club.

The Bishop Guertin French Club is also noteworthy. It features a reading group, a film club, and an annual trip to Quebec.

Bishop Guertin has a successful FIRST robotics team, Team 811, with over 75 members. They won the regional Chairmans Award in 2004, and 2014, and the Championship Competition Newton Division Finalist in 2004, as well as the Johnson and Johnson sportsmanship/gracious professionalism awards in 2003, 2007, and 2008, and the Imagery Award in 2005.

In June 2008, and every year since, a group of students led by Br. Donald Tardif and Mrs. Maureen Deblasio initiated a mission trip to Zambia to visit and do community work at a high school run by the Brothers of the Sacred Heart of Eastern and Southern Africa.

== Notable alumni ==
- Mike Lupica, sportswriter for the New York Daily News and the author of several books; class of 1970
- Edward Davis, Boston Police Commissioner (2006–2013); class of 1974
- Ted Phillips, president and CEO of the Chicago Bears; class of 1975
- Tim Dorsey, novelist; class of 1979
- Jim Collins, Rhodes Scholar and MacArthur "genius" bioengineer and inventor, MIT; class of 1983
- Russell Findlay, Chief Marketing Officer for Major League Soccer; class of 1983
- Mike O'Malley, Yes, Dear actor, "The Rick" from ESPN commercials, Glee actor, and the host of Get the Picture and Nickelodeon GUTS; class of 1984
- Jason Bedrick, former member of the New Hampshire legislature and first Orthodox Jew to hold elective office in the state; class of 2001

== Notable faculty ==
- Chip Cravaack (retired), former congressman from Minnesota (teaches: U.S. Government, U.S. History, Economics)
