= Jane Perlov =

Massachusetts Secretary of Public Safety
- In office 1998–2001
- Governor: Paul Cellucci; Jane M. Swift
- Preceded by: Kathleen O'Toole
- Succeeded by: James Jajuga

Personal details
- Born: 1956 (age 69–70) Bayside, Queens
- Occupation: Law Enforcement Officer

Jane Perlov is an American law enforcement official who served as Chief of the Raleigh, North Carolina Police Department from 2001 to 2007 and Massachusetts Secretary of Public Safety from 1998 to 2001.

From 1981 to 1998 Perlov was a member of the New York City Police Department. In 1994 she was promoted to captain and put in charge of the NYPD's 20th Precinct. A year she was promoted to Inspector and moved to the 30th Precinct, located in Harlem. In 1997 she was promoted to Chief of Detectives in Queens, becoming the first woman to command an entire borough of detectives.
