= Ed Davis (police officer) =

Police Commissioner of the Boston Police Department

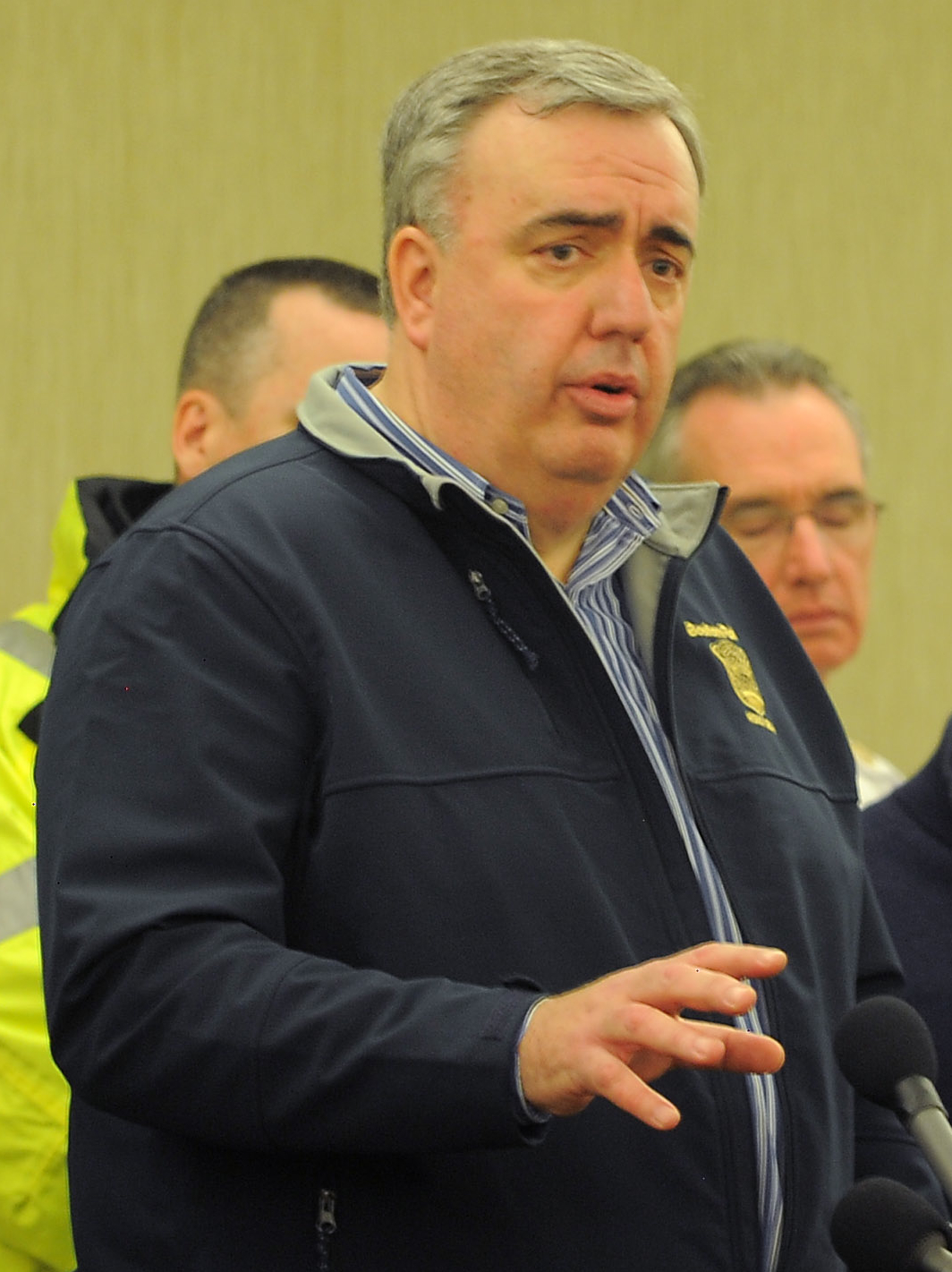
- Davis giving a news conference after the Boston Marathon bombing in 2013

Commissioner of the Boston Police Department
- In office December 5, 2006 – November 1, 2013
- Preceded by: Kathleen O'Toole
- Succeeded by: William B. Evans

Superintendent of the Lowell Police Department
- In office 1995–2006
- Preceded by: John Sheehan
- Succeeded by: Kenneth E. Lavallee

Personal details
- Born: July 31, 1956 (age 70) Lowell, Massachusetts, U.S.
- Spouse: Jane Davis
- Education: Bishop Guertin High School; Southern New Hampshire University (B.S.); Anna Maria College (M.S.)

Edward F. Davis III (born July 31, 1956) is the former police commissioner of the Boston Police Department, having served from 2006 to 2013, including during the Boston Marathon bombing. Following his resignation from the police, Davis has been the security analyst for WBZ-TV in Boston. He is the founder and CEO of Edward Davis, LLC Security and Management Consulting.

== Early life ==
Davis graduated from Bishop Guertin High School in Nashua, New Hampshire, in 1974. He received a Bachelor of Science in criminal justice in 1986 at Southern New Hampshire University. He received a Master of Science in criminal justice in 1990 at Anna Maria College. Later he attended the John F. Kennedy School of Government's Program for Senior Government Executives and the Law Enforcement Executive Development Association program at the FBI Academy in Quantico, Virginia.

== Law enforcement career ==
=== Lowell Police Department ===
Davis served on the Lowell Police Department from 1978 to 2006 when he was appointed Commissioner of the Boston Police Department. He held the positions of beat cop, Detective (1982–1984), Detective Sergeant (1984–1986) and Detective Lieutenant (1986–1992), before being promoted to Captain of the Narcotics and Organized Crime Unit in 1992.

He was named Superintendent of Police, the highest-ranking officer in the Lowell Police Department in 1994. From 1994 to 1999, he reduced the crime rate in Lowell quicker than any other American city with over 100,000 residents.

=== Boston Police Department ===
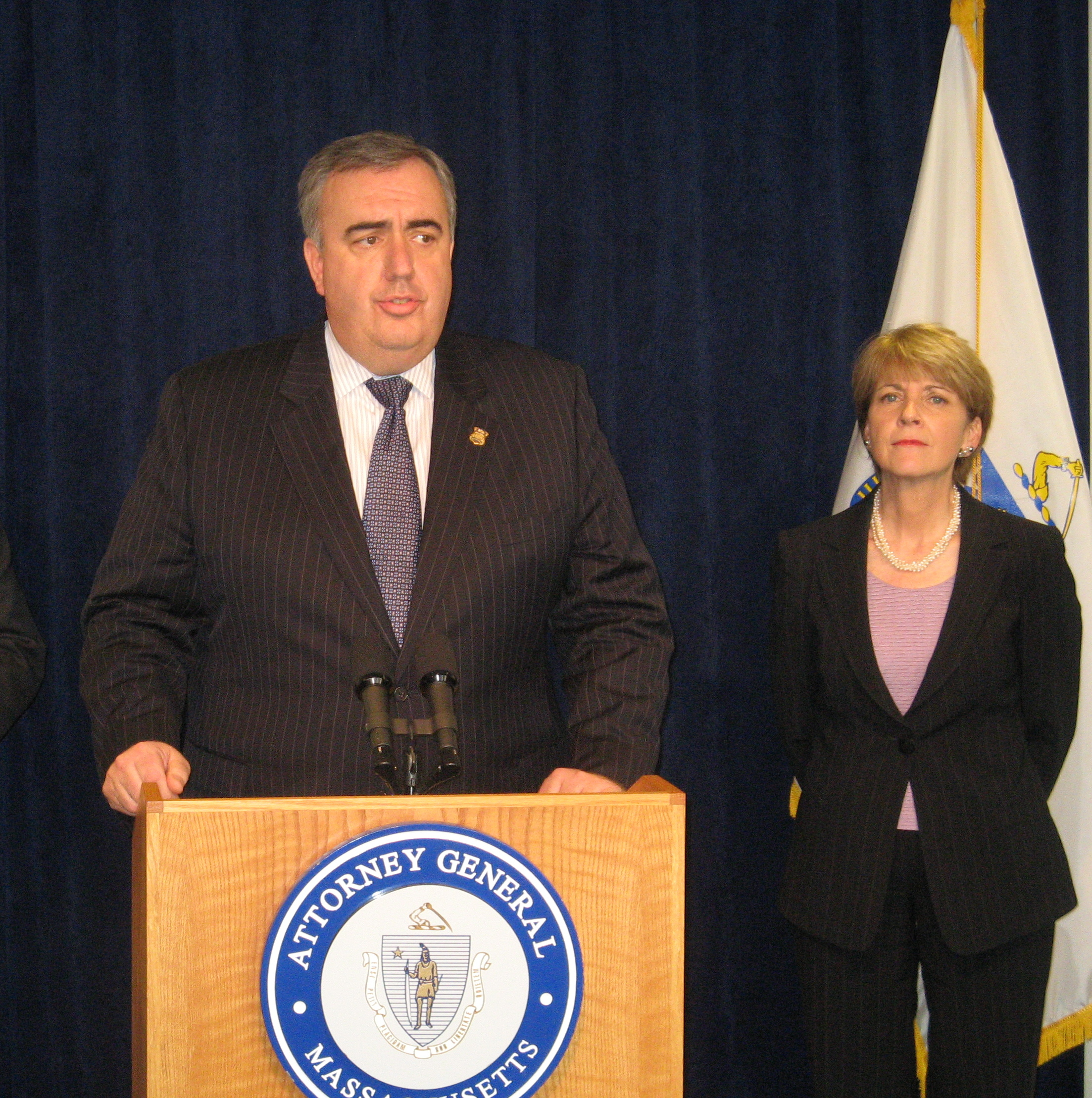
Davis conducts a press conference with Massachusetts Attorney General Martha Coakley in 2009

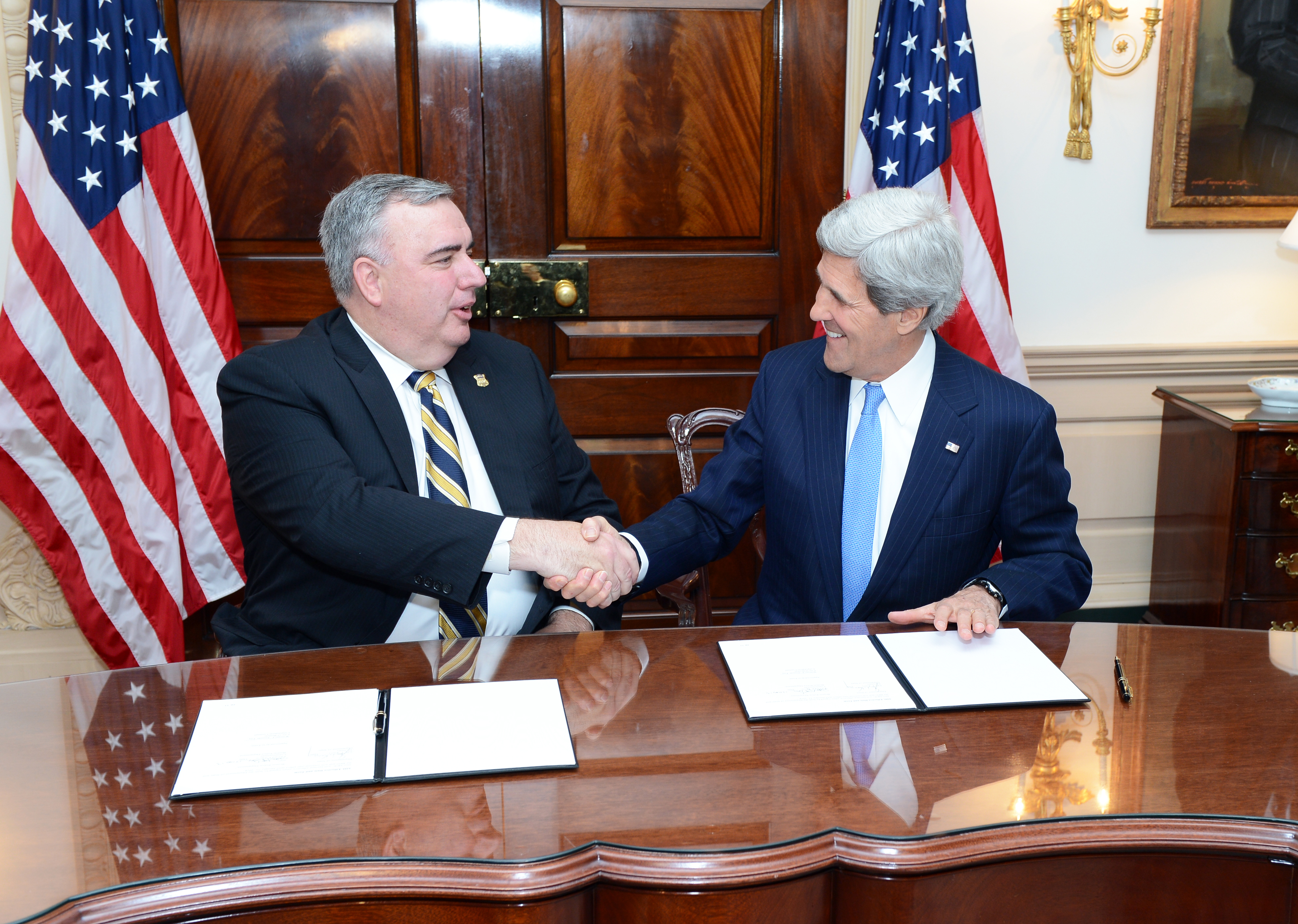
Davis with U.S. Secretary of State John Kerry in 2013

Davis was appointed the commissioner of the Boston Police Department on October 11, 2006.

Davis is well known for his leadership during the Boston Marathon bombing and subsequent manhunt. His actions during these events were dramatized in the film Patriots Day, in which he was portrayed by John Goodman.

On September 22, 2013, Davis announced his resignation from the Boston Police Department. He planned to become a visiting fellow at Harvard's Kennedy School of Government and also assist with a local non-profit helping offenders return to society. His final day as commissioner was November 1, 2013.

=== Later involvement ===
In 2022, Davis served on a panel appointed by Boston Mayor Michelle Wu to aid in the search for a commissioner of the Boston Police Department.

== Personal life ==
Davis was born and raised in Lowell, Massachusetts and remains a resident of his hometown with his wife Jane. Davis and his wife have three children (Edward, Kaitlyn and Phillip).

Police appointments
Preceded by Kathleen O'Toole	Commissioner of the Boston Police Department; 2006–2013	Succeeded by William B. Evans
