= Paul F. Evans =

American police officer

Paul Francis Evans, Jr.

Commissioner of the Boston Police Department
- In office January 10, 1994 – November 14, 2003 (acting commissioner: January 10, 1994–February 14, 1994)
- Preceded by: William Bratton
- Succeeded by: Kathleen O'Toole; James Hussey (acting)

Personal details
- Born: Paul Francis Evans, Jr. November 30, 1948 (age 77) Boston, Massachusetts
- Relatives: William B. Evans (brother)
- Police career
- Department: Boston Police Department
- Service years: 1970–2003
- Rank: Commissioner

Paul Francis Evans, Jr. (born November 30, 1948) is an American law enforcement officer who served as commissioner of the Boston Police Department from 1994 to 2003.

== Early life ==
Evans grew up in South Boston. His mother died when he was 13, and his father raised Evans and his four brothers alone. When Evans was 25, his father died, and Evans took on a paternal role towards his teenage brothers, one of whom, William B. Evans, served as Boston Police Commissioner from 2014 to 2018.

After graduating from high school, Evans enlisted in the United States Marines Corps. He served eleven months in Vietnam during the Vietnam War and fought in the Battle of Khe Sanh.

In 1969, Evans returned home. He enrolled in Boston College, found a job with the United States Postal Service, and planned on having a career in business. However, a cousin told him about the police exam, and Evans signed up without giving it much thought.

== Early career ==
Evans joined the Boston Police Department in 1970 as a street patrol officer. He was a member of the same class as William Bratton. In 1974, Evans graduated from Boston State College with a bachelor's degree in political science.

After five years as a patrolman in Dorchester, Evans was promoted to sergeant. He served as a day supervisor in South Boston during the height of the Boston busing crisis.

In 1978, Evans earned a J.D. degree from Suffolk University Law School. That same year he was promoted to Lieutenant, where he ran the night shift in Jamaica Plain and later in Brighton. He also worked in the Field Services bureau, where he was credited with developing the data that Commissioner Joseph M. Jordan's 1983 patrol plan was based on.

In 1980, he was named Deputy Superintendent. He was the commander of Area D, which consisted of the South End, Back Bay, and Allston–Brighton. In 1985, he was a finalist for the position of Police Commissioner, however, Mayor Raymond Flynn instead chose Francis Roache, the head of the Community Disorders Unit and a longtime friend. In 1986, he was placed in charge of the Field Services bureau, where he oversaw all of the department's uniformed officers and half of its detectives. He was tasked with implementing a new Evan patrol plan, which included reopening the district stations in Brighton and East Boston. Although he was not a member of Roache's inner circle, he was promoted because the Flynn administration admired his ability as an administrator and because he had a reputation among the officers as being fair and straightforward. After the abolishment of the superintendent-in-chief position, Evans became the administrator of day-to-day operations and the most influential commander in the department.

In February 1992, Evans was transferred to the Bureau of Investigative Services, where he was responsible for detectives and investigations. When Bratton became Police Commissioner in July 1993, Evans succeeded him as Superintendent-in-Chief.

== Police Commissioner ==
When Bratton was sworn in as Commissioner of the New York City Police Department, Evans became acting Commissioner. He was one of twenty-five candidates considered for the permanent by a search committee headed by former Associate Attorney General and US Attorney Wayne Budd and, along with State Police Lt. Col. Kathleen O'Toole, Boston Police Superintendent Joseph Carter, and former Chicago police commander Dennis Nowicki, was one of the four finalists presented to Mayor Thomas Menino. Menino selected Evans because he believed Evans' knowledge of the department would facilitate change without disrupting operations. Evans was sworn in on February 14, 1994.

At the time of Evans' appointment, the department was suffering from instability after Bratton's tumultuous five-month reign as commissioner, and crime rates were declining from historic peaks.

During his tenure as Police Commissioner, Evans built coalitions with other community organizations, academics, businesses, and law-enforcement agencies to develop programs, one example being a program that provided summer jobs for at-risk city youth. While Evans was Commissioner, Boston saw crime rates drop in most categories, including a dramatic drop in gang-related violence and homicides. This period of peace was known as the "Boston Miracle". In 2002, the city experienced a 31-year low in violent crime.

== Post-BPD career ==
In 2003, Evans left the department to become director of the Police Standards Unit of Britain's Home Office, which assessed the performance of British police forces and helped them improve. He remained with the Home Office until 2007.

After returning to the United States, Evans worked as a security consultant. In 2009, he was hired by Suffolk Downs to conduct an examination of Harrah's Entertainment, the company the track chose to partner with in its bid for a resort casino. In January 2012, Evans was hired by the owners of Suffolk Downs to run the track's security operations while they attempted to win a state license to operate a casino.

Police appointments
Preceded by William Bratton	Commissioner of the Boston Police Department; 1994–2003	Succeeded by Kathleen O'Toole
