= Kathleen O'Toole =

American police chief

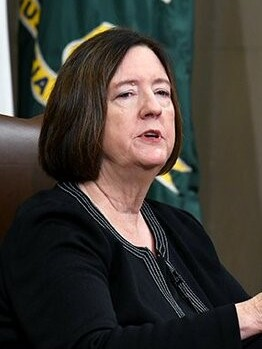
- O'Toole in 2020

Chief of the Seattle Police Department
- In office June 23, 2014 – January 4, 2018
- Preceded by: John Diaz; Harry Bailey (acting)
- Succeeded by: Carmen Best

Chief Inspector of the Garda Inspectorate
- In office 2006–2012

Commissioner of the Boston Police Department
- In office February 19, 2004 – May 31, 2006
- Preceded by: Paul F. Evans; James Hussey (acting)
- Succeeded by: Ed Davis; Al Goslin (acting)

Massachusetts Secretary of Public Safety
- In office 1994–1998
- Governor: Bill Weld
- Succeeded by: Jane Perlov

Lieutenant Colonel of the Massachusetts State Police
- In office 1992–1994

Head of the Metropolitan District Commission Police
- In office 1990–1991

Personal details
- Born: Kathleen Horton; May 9, 1954 (age 72) Pittsfield, Massachusetts, U.S.
- Spouse: Daniel O'Toole
- Children: Meghan
- Education: Boston College (BA); New England Law Boston (JD); Trinity College Dublin (PhD)

Kathleen M. O'Toole (née Horton; born May 9, 1954) is an American law enforcement officer who served as Chief of the Seattle Police Department (SPD) from June 23, 2014, to January 4, 2018. She was previously the first female commissioner of the Boston Police Department, when appointed by Mayor of Boston Thomas M. Menino in February 2004.

On May 9, 2006, her 52nd birthday, O'Toole officially announced that she was leaving the Boston Police Department to move to Ireland. She was the first Chief Inspector of the Garda Inspectorate, established to ensure that Garda Síochána operates effectively and efficiently. The Inspectorate reports directly to Ireland's Minister for Justice and Equality. She then returned to the U.S. and took her position in Seattle. O'Toole also sits on the bipartisan advisory board of States United Democracy Center.

== Early life and education ==
O'Toole was born in 1954 in Pittsfield, Massachusetts, and moved to Marblehead at age 13 and to Boston, Massachusetts, at age 18. She resided in Boston from that time until she took a position in Ireland in 2006. O'Toole earned a Bachelor of Arts from Boston College in 1976, a Juris Doctor from New England School of Law in 1982, and a PhD from the Business School of Trinity College Dublin in 2018.

== Career ==
O’Toole began her career in 1979 as a Boston police officer. In 1986, she joined the Metropolitan District Commission Police, at the time led by William Bratton. In 1990, she succeeded Bratton as head, but she left this position in 1991 in order to become a security executive for the Digital Equipment Corporation. O'Toole then served as Lieutenant Colonel of Massachusetts State Police from 1992 to 1994. While maintaining her sworn State Police rank, she served from 1994 to 1998 as Massachusetts Secretary of Public Safety in the cabinet of Governor William Weld. She was then appointed to the Patten Commission headed by Chris Patten which reformed policing in Northern Ireland and led to the formation of the Police Service of Northern Ireland. In May 2014, she was nominated by Mayor Ed Murray to become Seattle's first female chief of police.

=== Shooting of Victoria Snelgrove ===
While serving as Commissioner of the Boston Police, O'Toole was a central figure in the controversy surrounding the fatal shooting of Victoria Snelgrove during celebrations following the Boston Red Sox victory over the New York Yankees at Yankee Stadium in Game 7 the 2004 American League Championship Series. During attempts to control the crowd that had gathered near Fenway Park, Boston police fired a "less lethal" FN 303 round, which missed its intended target and struck Snelgrove in the eye, resulting in her death approximately 12 hours later.

While Commissioner O'Toole demoted Superintendent James Claiborne, who was not in the vicinity of the shooting, and suspended two officers involved in the incident, no prosecution or dismissal was brought against any officer in the case. Investigations led by former U.S. Attorney Donald K. Stern and Suffolk County District Attorney Daniel F. Conley concluded that criminal charges would not be appropriate.

=== Garda Inspectorate ===
The three-member Garda Inspectorate examines operational, investigative, managerial and policing strategies to ensure that these meet best practice. O'Toole's role within the Garda was to clean up conditions in the Gardaí. The Morris Tribunal pronounced that it was "staggered" by the level of indiscipline and insubordination in the force and the Irish Government responded with a revised code of discipline. O'Toole served her full term of office and was asked to stay on until the new Chief Inspector could take up his position in July 2012.

=== Later career ===
In late-2024, O'Toole and then-interim Seattle police chief Sue Rahr jointly led the search committee to make a recommendation to Mayor Bruce Harrell on who Seattle's next police chief should be. Their top recommendation was Madison, Wisconsin Police Chief Shon Barnes. Harrell heeded this recommendation and selected Barnes as his nominee for police chief.

== Personal life ==
She is married to Daniel O'Toole, now a retired Boston police detective. They have one daughter, Meghan, who received her undergraduate degree from Boston College and her master's degree from National University of Ireland, Galway.

Police appointments
Preceded by Thomas C. Rapone	Secretary, Executive Office of Public Safety, Comm. Of Massachusetts; 1994-1998	Succeeded by Jane Perlov
Preceded by Paul F. Evans	Commissioner of the Boston Police Department; 2004-2006	Succeeded by Edward F. Davis
Preceded by Office established	Chief Inspector of the Garda Inspectorate; 2006-2012	Succeeded by Robert K. Olson
