= William B. Evans =

American police officer (born 1958)

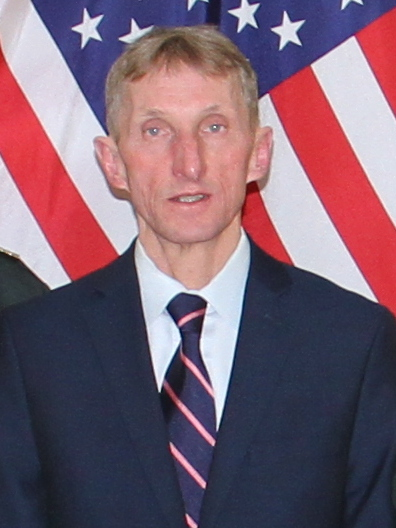
- Evans in 2019

Commissioner of the Boston Police Department
- In office January 9, 2014 – July 23, 2018
- Preceded by: Ed Davis
- Succeeded by: William G. Gross

Executive Director of Public Safety of the Boston College Police Department
- Incumbent
- Assumed office August 6, 2018

Chief of Police of the Boston College Police Department
- Incumbent
- Assumed office August 6, 2018

Personal details
- Born: William Brian Evans; September 21, 1958 (age 67) Boston, Massachusetts
- Relatives: Paul F. Evans (brother)
- Education: Chaminade University; Suffolk University (B.S.); Anna Maria College (M.S.)
- Awards: Boston Police Department's Medal of Honor

William B. Evans (born February 23, 1958) is currently serving as the executive director of public safety and chief of police of Boston College. Previously, Evans was the commissioner of the Boston Police Department from January 2014 until August 2018. Evans served as interim commissioner from November 2013 until he was permanently appointed by newly elected mayor Marty Walsh. He announced his retirement from the Boston Police Department in July 2018. He currently serves as the chief of the Boston College police department. A graduate of Suffolk University, Evans holds a master's degree in cybersecurity from Boston College and another master's in criminal justice from Anna Maria College. He is also a graduate of the FBI’s National Academy, FBI's National Executive Institute, Department of Homeland Security Post Naval Executive Leaders Program and received several certificates from the Kennedy School of Government at Harvard University in subjects ranging from homeland security to preparedness leadership. He is active in several professional organizations, including the International Association of Chiefs of Police and the Major Cities Chiefs Association, and is currently an adjunct professor at Boston College and Boston University.

== Early life ==
William Evans was born in South Boston, the son of Paul and Catherine Evans, and one of six brothers. His father was a truck driver and his mother was a housewife and homemaker. He grew up in a crowded triple-decker apartment in South Boston, where he shared a bed with two brothers. His mother died when he was three years old, and six years later, his older brother was struck by a car and killed. When he was fifteen years old, his father died. He was raised by his four older brothers, the eldest of whom was Paul, who is the current executive vice president of security and compliance for Suffolk Downs and former Boston Police Commissioner, 1994 - 2003. They enrolled him in Saint Sebastian's School in Needham, Massachusetts. After graduation, Evans attended Chaminade University for one year before returning to Boston. Upon his return he enrolled at Suffolk University, graduating in 1982.

== Boston Police Department ==
=== Early years ===
In 1980, Evans joined the Boston Police Department cadet program. He worked in administrative positions in the department's District Four in the South End at night and attended class at Suffolk University during the day. Evans joined the Boston Police Department in 1982. He spent five years as a patrolman, during which time he was awarded the BPD's Medal of Honor for his role in apprehending an armed robbery suspect following a high-speed chase. In 1987 he scored the highest grade in his class on the sergeant's exam. Five years later he earned one of the highest grades on the lieutenant's test and in 1997 he received the highest grade in his class on the captain's exam.

=== Captain ===
As a captain, Evans was first stationed in District 14, which consisted of the Allston–Brighton section of Boston. It was the BPD's most densely populated district and contained 75,000 residents. This district included Harvard Business School, Boston College. He dealt with a number of issues involving college students, including public intoxication, noise complaints, and fighting. He pushed for stricter alcohol policies during tailgating for the Harvard–Yale football game, refused to sign off on a Snoop Dogg concert at Harvard, which he feared would attract "the wrong element," unless more officers were hired (which led to the concert being canceled). To smooth over relations between the schools and the Police Department, Evans took college administrators on ride-alongs, addressed students during orientation week, and pressured landlords to pay closer attention to troublesome properties. In 2006 he moved to District 4, which covered the South End and Fenway. In 2008 Evans graduated from Harvard University's John F. Kennedy School of Government.

=== Superintendent ===
In 2009, Evans was promoted to superintendent in charge of the Bureau of Field Services. In this position he oversaw special events and the department's patrol division. Evans played a role in the peaceful handling of Occupy Boston's 70-day occupation of Dewey Square. He served as a go-between for the protesters and the department and ensured that there were no violent confrontations between protesters and police like those that occurred at other camps.

==== Boston Marathon bombings ====
Evans ran the 2013 Boston Marathon and was at the Boston Athletic Club when he was informed by an officer that two bombs went off. Evans returned home for his uniform and then went to the temporary command post at the Westin Hotel. There, he and Commissioner Edward F. Davis designed a plan of action, which Evans took to the streets to implement. Under Evans, the department secured a perimeter around a 20-block radius, swept the scene for secondary devices, and began processing the evidence.

When President Barack Obama came to Boston to attend an interfaith service at the Cathedral of the Holy Cross, Evans and his team were responsible for securing the area. They developed a plan to get the President and First Lady in and out of the five different hospitals they visited.

Evans also played a role in the manhunt and capture of Dzhokhar Tsarnaev. He helped secure the area of the Watertown shootout, process the crime scene, and evacuate nearby houses, as there were live explosives on the scene. He remained in Watertown during the manhunt and stayed even after Governor Deval Patrick lifted the shelter-in-place order. After the 911 call reporting Tsarnaev's location came in, Evans, two Boston Police Lieutenants (Bob Merner and Paul O'Connor) and a Watertown Police Officer were the first officers at the scene on Franklin Street in Watertown. Evans took control of the scene and was the incident commander during the standoff with Tsarnaev. Shots rang out at one point during the standoff and Evans commanded the officers to hold their fire, as he wanted to take Tsarnaev alive for information. After talking with an FBI negotiation team, Tsarnaev surrendered to authorities.

=== Commissioner ===
On November 1, 2013, Mayor Thomas Menino named Evans interim commissioner of the Boston Police Department. In January 2014, Mayor Marty Walsh selected Evans to serve as police commissioner on a permanent basis.

On July 23, 2018, Evans announced he would step down as commissioner of the Boston Police Department after having served 39 years, having accepted a position with the public safety department at Boston College beginning on August 6. He was succeeded by his superintendent in chief, William G. Gross.

Police appointments
| Preceded by Edward F. Davis | Commissioner of the Boston Police Department; 2014–2018 | Succeeded by William G. Gross |
