= List of defunct law enforcement agencies of Massachusetts =

The following is an overview of defunct law enforcement agencies of the Commonwealth of Massachusetts.

Three of these agencies (Registry of Motor Vehicles Division of Law Enforcement, Massachusetts Capitol Police, and the Metropolitan District Commission Police) were merged in 1992 by Chapter 412 of the Massachusetts Acts of 1991 along with the former Department of Public Safety - Division of State Police to form the current Department of State Police. Many officers of the three departments became Massachusetts State Troopers at the time of the merger.

The remaining agencies have been either outright abolished/eliminated, merged with other agencies, had their duties absorbed by other agencies, or were de facto eliminated by refusal to renew the police powers of their personnel.

== Blandford Police Department ==
In July 2018, the entire (four-person) police department of the town of Blandford, Massachusetts resigned simultaneously, citing "unsafe working conditions." While the town government initiated proceedings as to how the situation would be handled, the neighboring town of Chester, Massachusetts offered to assist by patrolling Blandford with Chester Police Department personnel. The Chester Police Department chief was sworn-in as the interim chief of the Blandford Police Department within months, and hired as the permanent police chief by mid-2019. The two towns began exploring joining the two forces together, officially, and by December 2019 this was accomplished. With Chester as the "lead town," the Blandford Police Department was dissolved, its assets merged into the newly re-named "Chester-Blandford Police Department." The agency would be the second dual-town police department in Massachusetts after the 2014 creation of the Hardwick-New Braintree Police Department.

== Boston Municipal Police ==
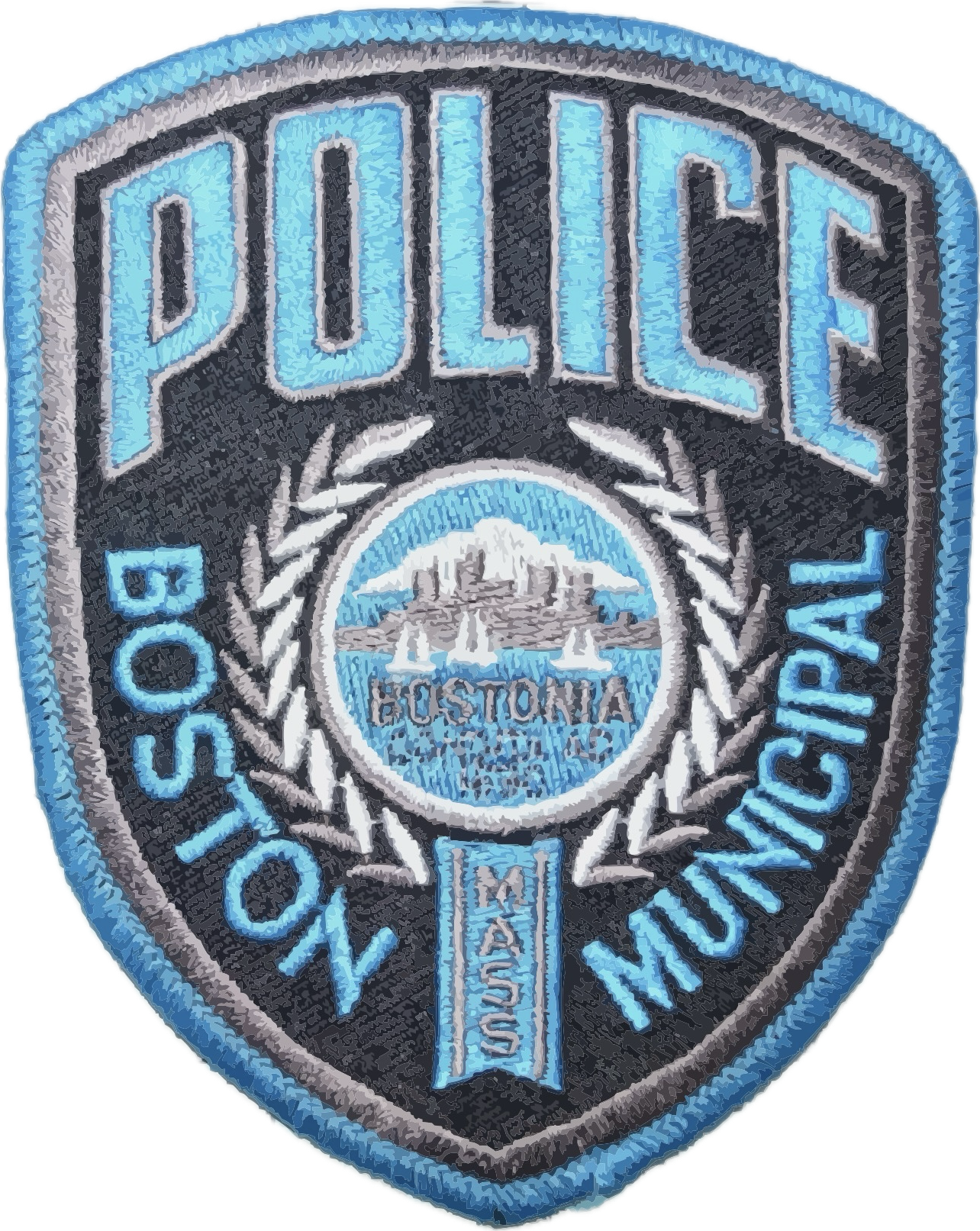
The shoulder patch worn by the Boston Municipal Police at the time of their disbandment on 1 January 2007.

The Boston Municipal Police (BMP) was founded in 1979 and were armed and sworn police officers. The BMP served as the security police agency of the City of Boston, originally under the Public Facilities Department, but later the Property Management Department. BMP personnel were responsible for law enforcement and security services on most city-owned properties and buildings (to include Boston Police Department properties and buildings). The BMP was dissolved on January 1, 2007 and replaced by the Boston Municipal Protective Services (BMPS), an unarmed security force.

As of 1 January 2007, BMPS officers initially held special police powers via the Boston Police Department's "Rule 400/400A" licensing scheme. All BMPS personnel lost such police powers due to the passage of the 2021 Massachusetts Police Reform Law and establishment of the POST Commission. BMPS personnel remain under the Property Management Department and are now an unarmed, non-sworn safety, security, and property management service.

== Boston School Police ==
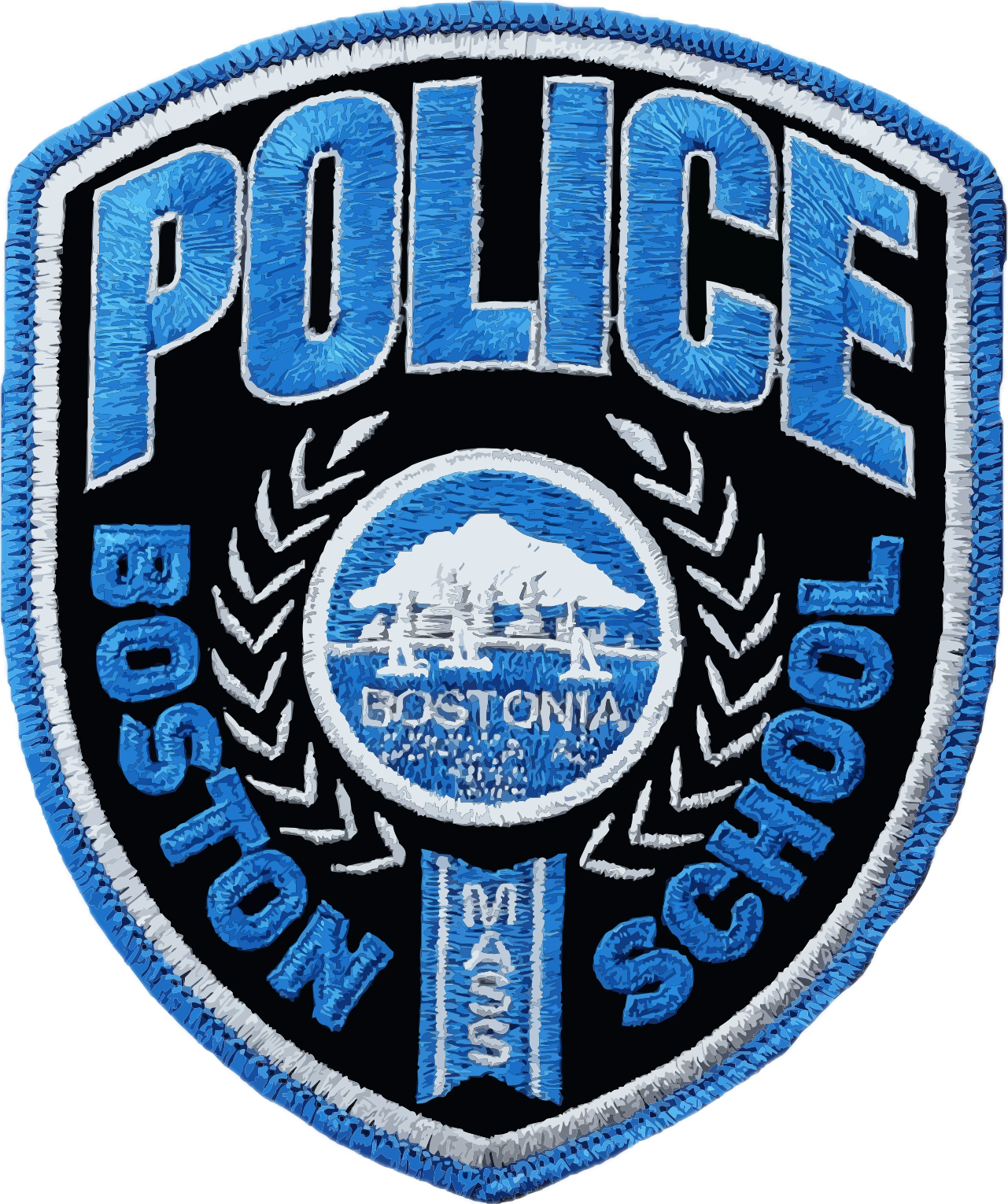
The shoulder patch worn by Boston School Police at the time of their disbandment.

The Boston School Police (BSP) formerly served as the security police agency of the Boston Public Schools. The Boston Public Schools were served by a non-sworn "safety and security" force until the BSP’s official establishment in 1982. Like the Boston Municipal Protective Services post-merger, BSP personnel held police powers under the Boston Police Department's "Rule 400 and 400A" special police officer licensing scheme. BSP officers were always unarmed. BSP officers lost their police powers effective July 1, 2021, when the Boston Police Department declined to renew their special police licenses under the auspices of the Massachusetts Police Reform Act and newly-created POST Commission. The Boston Public Schools, faced with the prospect of a non-sworn, unarmed "police" agency, transitioned the BSP into the "Office of Safety Services," (OSS) effective July 1, 2021; The OSS manages safety and security issues across the Public Schools system via unarmed and non-sworn safety and security officers, crossing guards, etc. The OSS is supplemented, where and when needed, by armed and sworn Boston Police school resource officers. As of 2023, the Boston Public Schools had advised the mayor of Boston that re-creating their own, stand-alone law enforcement agency should be considered. As of 2026, this recommendation has not been acted-upon.

== Department of Public Safety - Division of State Police ==
This is the former statewide police department for the Commonwealth of Massachusetts, which was founded in 1865; the M.D.C. Police, Registry of Motor Vehicles Police, and Capitol Police merged with this department to form the new Department of State Police in 1992. Prior to being known as the Massachusetts State Police, from 1865 to 1879 the agency was known as the "Massachusetts State Constabulary," or simply the "Massachusetts Constabulary." From 1879 to 1919 it was known as the "Special District Police of Massachusetts." From 1919 the agency assumed its current name, the "Massachusetts State Police."

== Massachusetts Capitol Police ==
The shoulder patch worn by the Massachusetts Capitol Police at the time of their 1992 disbandment.

The Massachusetts Capitol Police (MCP) functioned as the security police force of the Commonwealth of Massachusetts, providing security and law enforcement services to the Massachusetts state capitol complex in Boston as well as the grounds around it, in addition to any other state properties the Commonwealth assigned to the MCP. MCP officers were armed and fully-sworn police officers throughout the Commonwealth of Massachusetts. The MCP provided foot and vehicular (to include motorcycles) patrols, criminal investigations, and executive protection services. In 1992, the MCP was amalgamated into the Massachusetts State Police, with personnel either leaving or becoming Massachusetts State Troopers. As of 2019 — twenty-seven years post-disbandment — two former MCP officers remained with the Massachusetts State Police, though both retired within the following years.

== Massachusetts Convention Center Authority Police ==
The Massachusetts Convention Center Authority Police Department was formed during the creation of the authority in 1982. The department patrolled the Convention Center Authority owned property including the John B. Hynes Convention Center. The department was disbanded with the opening of the Boston Convention & Exhibition Center in 2004 and contracted security guards were hired to patrol properties. The contracted guards were replaced by the Massachusetts Convention Center Authority Public Safety Department in 2010.

== Metropolitan District Commission Police ==
The shoulder patch worn by the Metropolitan District Commission Police at the time of their 1992 disbandment.

The Metropolitan District Commission's (MDC’s) police department, commonly known as the Metropolitan Police, was formed in 1893. The MDC Police had the primary jurisdiction of law enforcement on all MDC controlled properties, roadways and all Massachusetts Water Resources Authority (MWRA) facilities, reservoirs, and watersheds. Additionally, the MDC Police had patrol jurisdiction on US Route 1 in Chelsea and Revere, and Interstate 93 in Boston and Milton (Central Artery and the Southeast Expressway). The MDC Police also had full jurisdiction in cities and towns wherever there were MDC facilities or property.

The MDC Police was the third-largest police agency in New England with over six hundred officers, working primarily throughout Metropolitan Boston. They were commonly referred to as "The Mets". In addition to patrol functions, the MDC Police provided tactical assistance to area cities and towns in the form of regional SWAT teams, the marine unit, and tactical operations units. Examples include tactical officers assigned to the city of Boston during court ordered school desegregation, assignment as the primary security agency for the Department of State with the responsibility of providing security and escorts for visiting dignitaries, and annual assignments to assist cities and towns during the Boston Marathon.

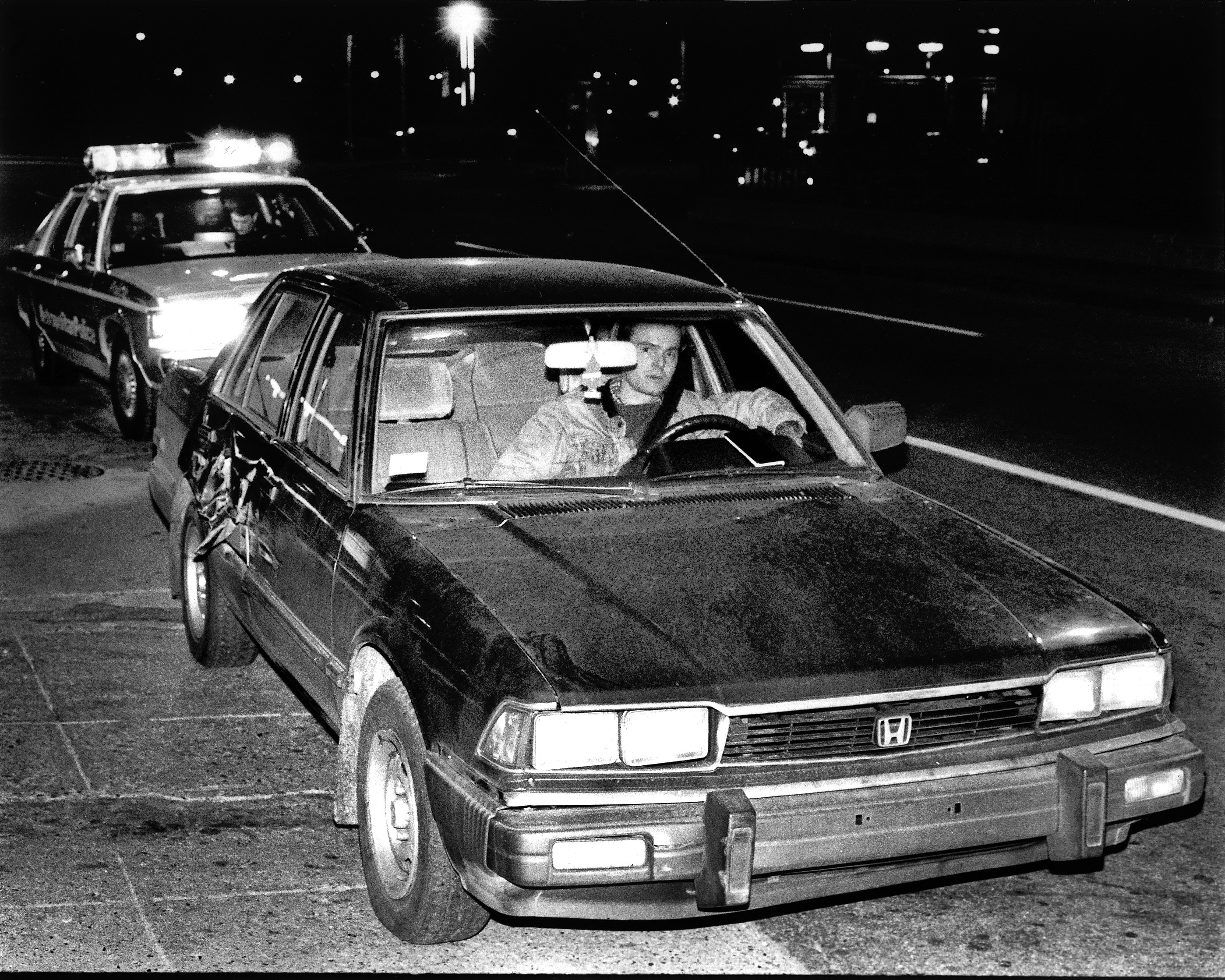
A car driver pulled over by two Metropolitan District Commission policemen for having run a red light in Cambridge, 1990.

The MDC Police also maintained a full-service detective unit to investigate crimes on its primary jurisdiction as well as providing detectives and undercover agents to area cities and towns, area Drug Task Forces, the (state) Governor's Auto Theft Strike Force, the DEA Boston Drug Task Force, the Secret Service, and the FBI.

The last chief of the MDC Police was former Boston Police Commissioner William J. Bratton, who later was Commissioner of the New York City Police Department and Chief of the Los Angeles Police Department. In 1992, Metropolitan District Commission Police, along with Massachusetts Department of Public Safety – Division of State Police, Massachusetts Registry of Motor Vehicles Police, Massachusetts Capitol Police, merged into the Massachusetts State Police.

The following current Massachusetts State Police Barracks were MDC Police districts:

- · MSP Barracks A4 − Medford (Middlesex Fells MDC District)
- · MSP Barracks A5 − Revere (Revere Beach MDC District)
- · MSP Barracks H4 − Boston (Lower Basin MDC District)
- · MSP Barracks H5 − Brighton (Upper Basin MDC District)
- · MSP Barracks H6 − South Boston (Old Colony MDC District)
- · MSP Barracks H7 − Milton (Blue Hills MDC District)
- · MSP Barracks C7 − Belchertown (Quabbin MDC District)

Additionally, the following State Police Units are based out of former MDC Police facilities:

- · MSP Marine Unit (New Charles River Dam, Boston)
- · MSP Canine Unit (Pond St., Stoneham)

The following former MDC police stations were closed within the first few years of the consolidation/merger:

- · Wachusett District (Wachusett and Sudbury Reservoirs and watersheds)
- · Nantasket Beach District (Nantasket Beach, Hull)
- · Nahant Beach Substation (Nahant Beach, Nahant)
- · Mounted Unit Stables (Stoneham and Milton)

== Massachusetts Parking Authority Police ==
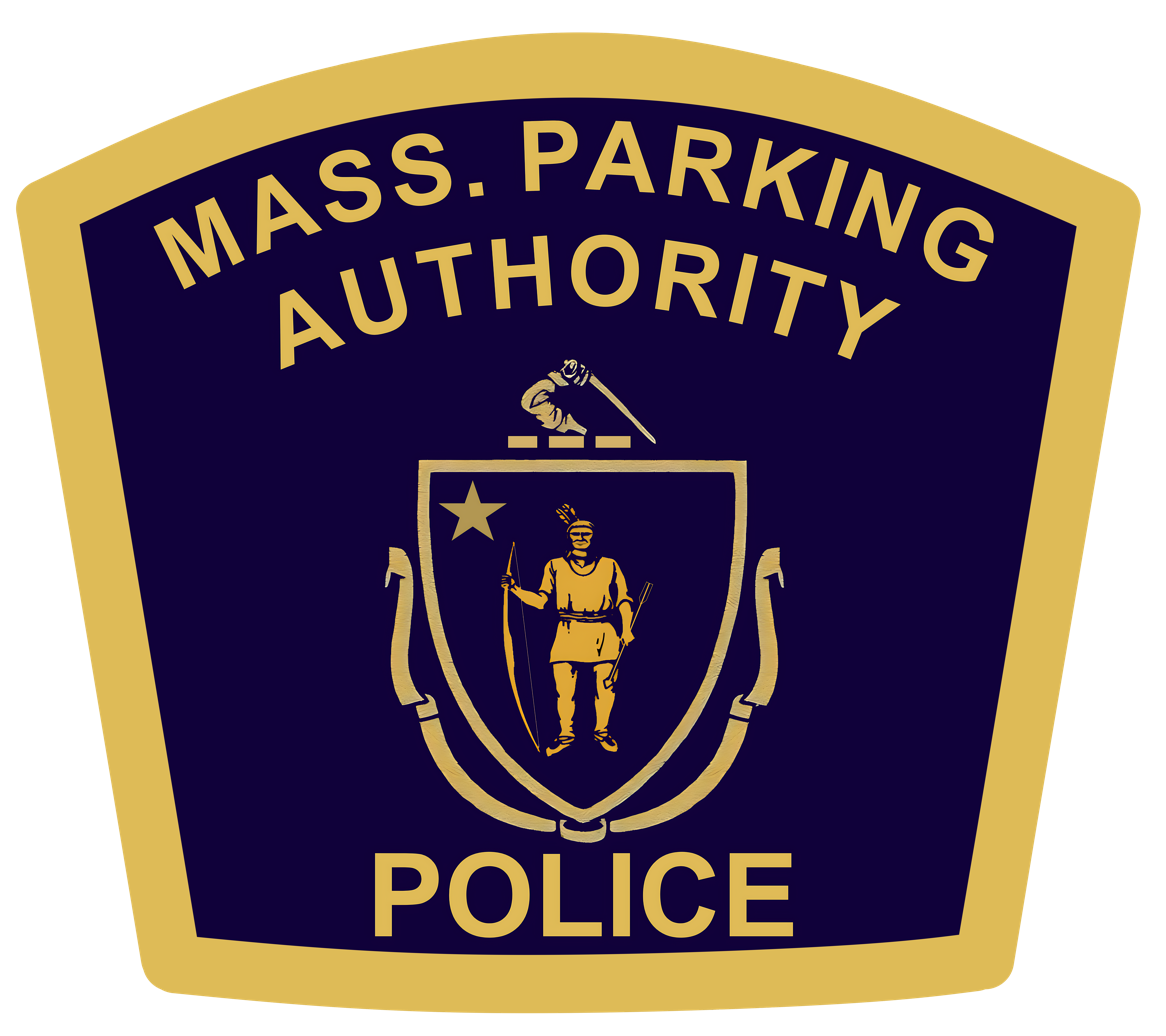
The shoulder patch worn by the Massachusetts Parking Authority Police at the time of their 1982 disbandment.

The Massachusetts Parking Authority Police patrolled the Boston Common Garage, Charles Street, and parts of the Boston Common from 1975 until the Parking Authority was disbanded and the garage turned over to the Massachusetts Convention Center Authority in 1982. The agency was absorbed by the Massachusetts Convention Center Authority Police (itself created in 1982, and disbanded in 2004).

== Massachusetts Registry of Motor Vehicles Division of Law Enforcement ==
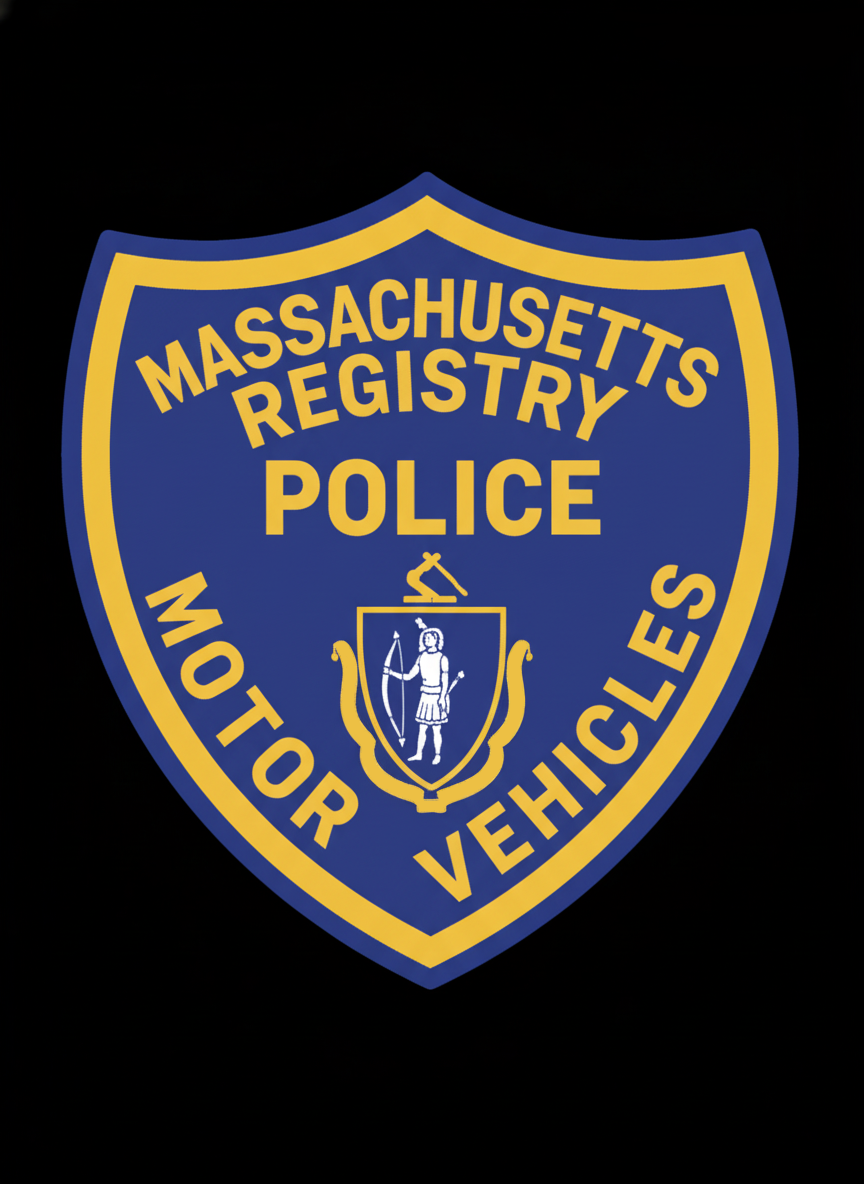
The shoulder patch worn by the Massachusetts Registry of Motor Vehicles Division of Law Enforcement at the time of their disbandment in 1992.

The Massachusetts Registry of Motor Vehicles Division of Law Enforcement (commonly referred to as the "RMV Police" or "Registry Police") had the primary function of enforcing motor vehicle safety laws statewide, conducting drivers' license testing, conducting major motor vehicle crash investigations, enforcing laws & regulations on Registry property, as well as school bus and commercial vehicle inspection; RMV Police "inspectors" (as their law enforcement personnel were referred to) held full police powers throughout the Commonwealth of Massachusetts and were permitted to carry firearms on- and off-duty.

Inspectors were unique in the fact that as Registry employees they were able to suspend an operator's license on the roadside.

The RMV Police headquarters was located at 100 Nashua Street, Boston, Massachusetts. RMV inspectors were, with some exceptions, sworn as Massachusetts State Troopers with the RMV Police's 1992 amalgamation into the nascent "Department of State Police."

== Massachusetts Department of Developmental Services Police ==
The Massachusetts Department of Developmental Services (DDS) Police patrolled properties operated by the DDS, such as the Wrentham Developmental Center in Wrentham, Massachusetts. Select personnel were sworn as "special state police officers." The DDS Police personnel carried most standard law enforcement equipment, but did not carry firearms. Rather than comply with the new standards set by the 2020 "Massachusetts Police Reform Law," the DDS and its parent agency, the Executive Office of Health and Humans Services, elected to disband the DDS Police, replacing them with non-sworn, un-armed security personnel, despite the Massachusetts POST Commission exempting the DDS Police from the new law.

== Massachusetts Department of Mental Health Police ==
The Massachusetts Department of Mental Health (DMH) Police patrolled properties operated by the DMH, such as the Worcester Recovery Center and Hospital, the Massachusetts Mental Health Center, the Bridgewater State Hospital, and the Dr. Solomon Carter Mental Health Center. Select personnel were sworn as "special state police officers." DMH Police personnel carried most standard law enforcement equipment, but did not carry firearms. Rather than comply with the new standards set by the 2020 "Massachusetts Police Reform Law," the DMH and its parent agency, the Executive Office of Health and Humans Services, elected to disband the DMH Police, replacing them with non-sworn, un-armed security personnel, despite the Massachusetts POST Commission exempting the DMH Police from the new law.

== Massachusetts Department of Mental Retardation Police ==
The Massachusetts Department of Mental Retardation (DMR) Police patrolled properties operated by the DMR, such as the Walter E. Fernald Developmental Center in Waltham, Massachusetts. Select personnel were sworn as "special state police officers." DMR Police personnel carried most standard law enforcement equipment, but did not carry firearms. The DMR was re-named to the Massachusetts Department of Developmental Services around 2007, with the DMR Police becoming the DDS Police.

== New Braintree Police Department ==
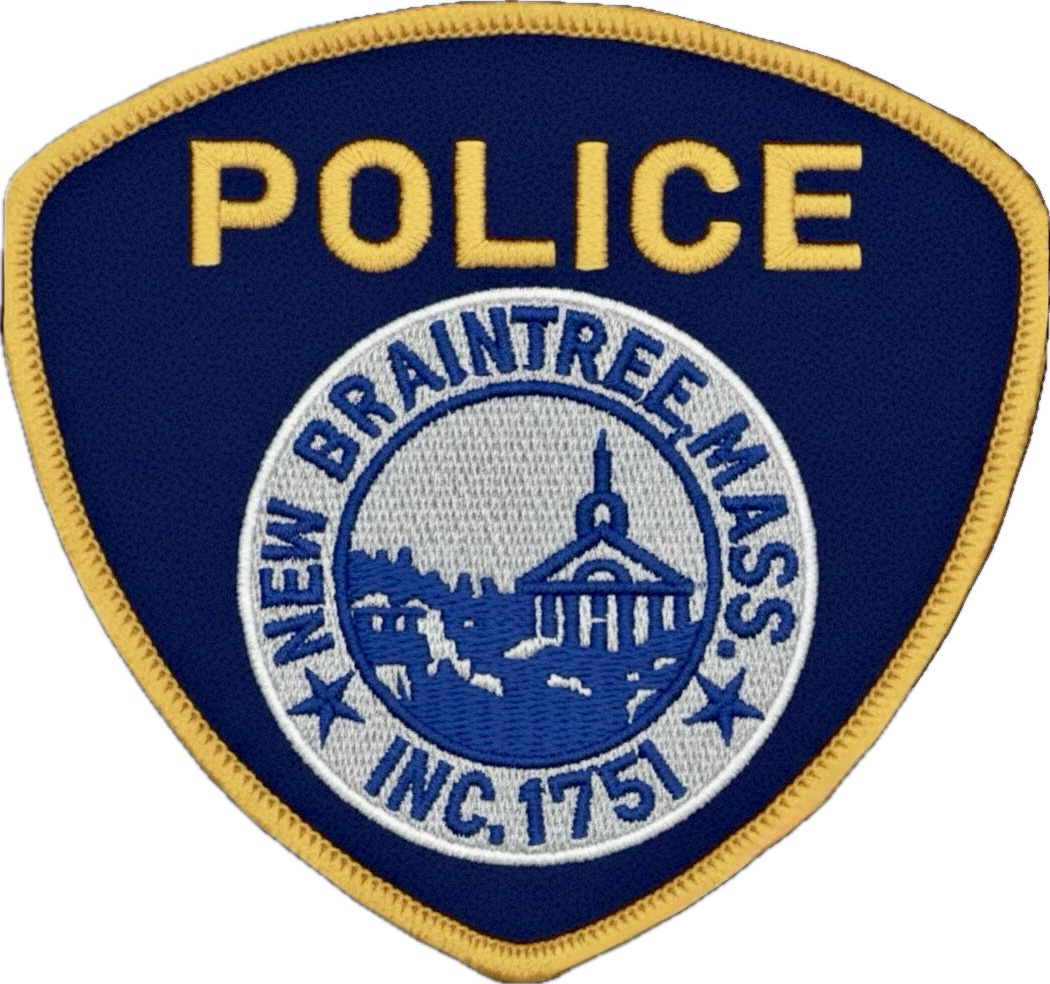
The shoulder patch worn by the now-defunct New Braintree Police Department at the time of its amalgamation into the Hardwick-New Braintree Police Department in 2014.

The formerly-independent police department of New Braintree, Massachusetts was absorbed by the neighboring police department of Hardwick, Massachusetts, effective July 1, 2014. The Hardwick Police Department was re-designated the Hardwick-New Braintree Police Department. The final New Braintree Police Department chief retired immediately prior to the merger. As of 2026, the Hardwick-New Braintree Police Department, the Chester-Blandford Police Department, and the Russell-Montgomery Police Department are the only (municipal) law enforcement agencies to serve two towns in Massachusetts. The Hardwick-New Braintree Police Department was the first dual-town agency in Massachusetts.

== Worcester Airport Police ==
The Worcester Airport Police patrolled the grounds Worcester Regional Airport. The department was unique in that in provided both law enforcement and firefighting services to the airport. Unique among Massachusetts law enforcement, officers of the Worcester Airport Police were required to be certified as Massachusetts "special state police officers" as well as firefighters. The Worcester Airport Police were disbanded some time after the Massachusetts Port Authority took over the airport on 1 July 2010. Police services at the airport are now covered by the Massachusetts State Police and the Massachusetts Port Authority Police. Firefighting services are covered by the Massachusetts Port Authority Fire Rescue.

== Soldiers' Home Police ==
The shoulder patch worn by the now-defunct "Soldiers' Home Police" agencies of the various soldiers' homes in Massachusetts.

The Soldiers' Homes (now known as "Veterans' Homes") in Holyoke and Chelsea, Massachusetts, were both patrolled by dedicated security police departments. Soldiers' Home Police officers were sworn as "special state police officers." Both agencies were disbanded in 2024 due to the Massachusetts Police Reform Law, despite Soldiers' Home special state police officers being exempted from the new law, and the Veterans' Homes are now patrolled by unarmed, non-sworn security guards with assistance from relevant local law enforcement when necessary.

== Others ==
- Holyoke Medical Center Security (select personnel were formerly sworn as SSPOs; as per 2021's Massachusetts Police Reform Law, Holyoke Medical Center declined to comply with the new standards required to obtain SSPO licensure)
- Springfield Park Rangers
- Worcester Housing Authority Police

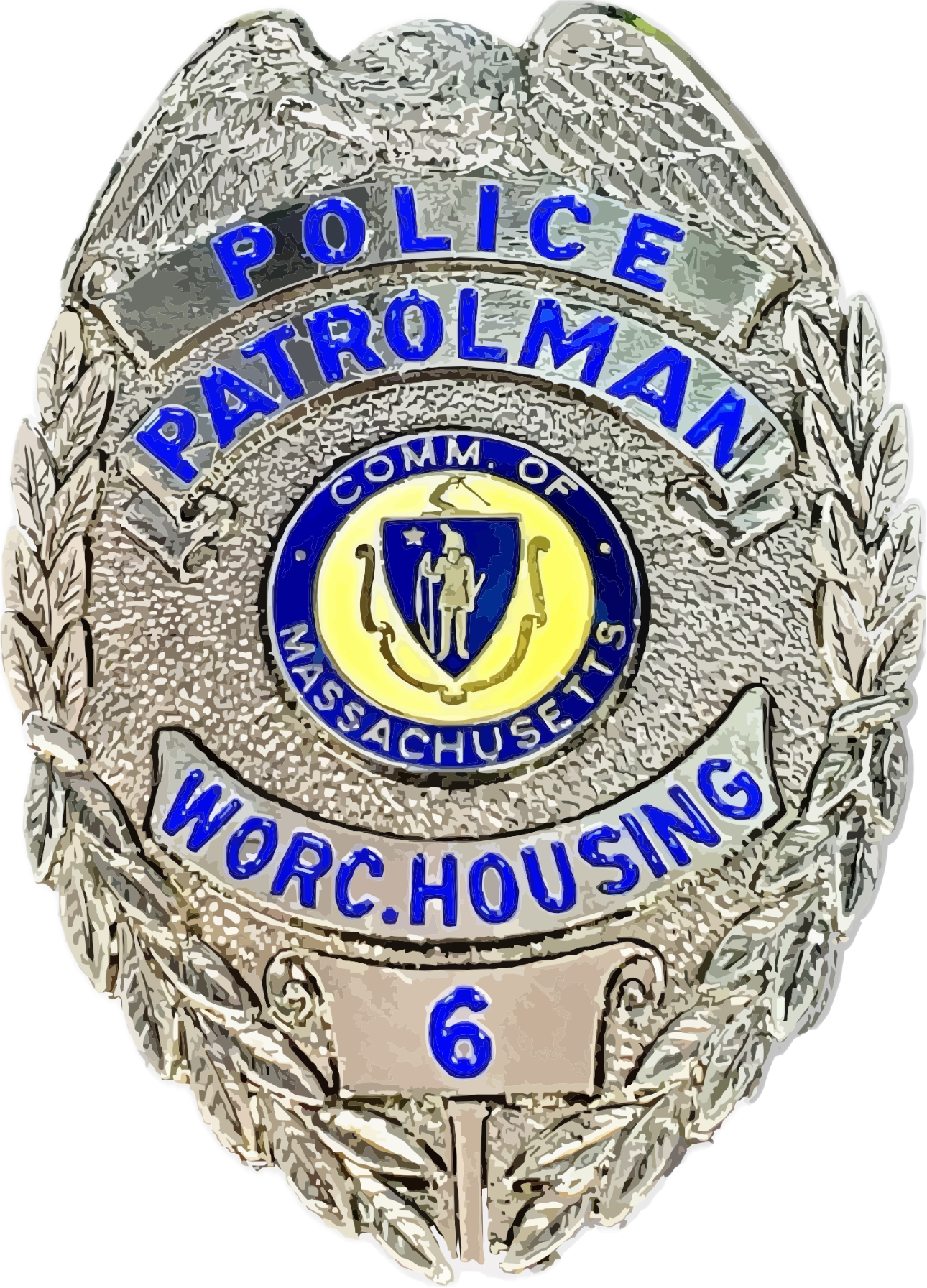
The badge worn by the now-defunct Worcester Housing Authority Police.

== See also ==
- List of law enforcement agencies in Massachusetts
