= Nora L. Baston =

- Born: Mattapan, Boston, Massachusetts, U.S.
- Education: Boston Latin School; University of Massachusetts Lowell (BA, MA)
- Occupation: Police officer
- Known for: Fourth woman to be Superintendent at Boston PD
- Police career
- Department: Boston Police Department
- Service years: 1996–present
- Rank: Superintendent
- Awards: Black Women Lead project recognition (2023)

Nora L. Baston is a superintendent in the Bureau of Professional Development, City of Boston Police Department. She is the fourth woman to be superintendent at Boston PD.

Baston was born in the Mattapan neighborhood and lived in Dorchester and Hyde Park. She played basketball at and graduated from Boston Latin School. She earned bachelor's and master's degrees from University of Massachusetts Lowell. Baston joined Boston PD in 1996. Baston worked with Reverend Richard Conway of St. Peter's parish in Dorchester to fight gang violence.

In 2023, she was recognized as one of "Boston’s most admired, beloved, and successful Black Women leaders" by the Black Women Lead project.
