= Boston Emergency Medical Services =

Ambulance service in Boston

Coordinates: 42.3343°N 71.0724°W

- Boston EMS headquarters
- Established: 1892
- Headquarters: 785 Albany Street, Boston, Massachusetts 02118
- Jurisdiction: City of Boston
- Total area (sq. miles): 48.43
- Dept. type: Full-time Paid
- Employees: 400 plus
- BLS or ALS: BLS/ALS 2 tier system
- Stations: 16 stations located throughout the city
- Ambulances: 23 BLS/5 ALS day and evening shifts-14 BLS/3 ALS night shift
- Chief: James Hooley, EMT-P
- Medical director: Sophia Dyer, MD, FACEP
- Responses: More than 140,000 calls annually
- Website: Official website

Boston Emergency Medical Services (Boston EMS) provides basic life support (BLS) and advanced life support (ALS) ambulance units throughout the neighborhoods in the city of Boston, Massachusetts, USA. Boston EMS is a public safety agency responding to 911 calls alone or with the Boston Police and/or Boston Fire Departments dependent upon the nature of an incident. The agency employs over 400 emergency medical technicians (EMT) and paramedics.

Boston EMS is a bureau of the City of Boston Public Health Commission. Boston EMS hires Massachusetts State certified EMTs by competitive examination and upon completion of the Boston EMS Recruit Academy, and then promotes paramedics from within the department after completing an intense internship. The department is managed by a uniformed command staff consisting of a Chief of Department, a Superintendent-in-Chief, three Superintendents, and twelve Deputy Superintendents.

There are sixteen ambulance stations located throughout the city. Field operations are overseen by a Shift Commander and assisted by 2 Lieutenants (Field Supervisors) operating in 2 Divisions. A third Lieutenant and field Captains are deployed as needed and during major citywide events. All department vehicles are equipped with Global Positioning (GPS) and Mobile Data Terminals (MDT). An EMT is assigned to the Massachusetts State Police Harbor Unit from mid spring though late fall.

Boston EMS maintains a fully staffed Special Operations Unit which includes a heavy duty rescue truck, two medium duty rescue trucks, a state-of-the-art MCI bus, support trailers, ATVs and a bike team for special events and major incidents. In addition, several other specialized units provide logistical/technical support for Boston EMS operations, including a modern Dispatch Operations Center (staffed by EMTs) located in Boston Police Headquarters, the Research, Training, and Quality Improvement Division (RTQI), a Community Initiatives Office and Administration & Finance office. The Materials Management Unit provides 24-hour equipment/supply services and the Fleet Services Unit maintain an inventory of approximately 120 department vehicles. There are also Facilities and Communications Engineering sections.

Boston EMS has a full-time two-person Community Assistance Team, with the call sign, Squad 80, that operates during the day and evening shifts. Squad 80 responds to call types with a low frequency of transport, freeing up ambulances. Squad 80 also seeks to connect individuals to city services, including shelters and recovery programs. Boston EMS also has a Mobile Integrated Healthcare unit, with the call sign Squad 90, that operates during the day and evening shifts. Squad 90 is staffed by a Boston EMS EMT, along with a Behavioral Health Clinician, who respond to calls citywide, including calls involving patients having a mental health crisis.

Boston EMS is a unionized department with EMTs and Paramedics represented by the Boston Police Patrolmen's Association, EMS Division; Support Services staff represented by the American Federation of State, County and Municipal Employees (AFSCME); Command Staff represented by SENA, and civilian office/clerical staff represented by SEIU.

== Fleet ==
The Boston EMS ambulance fleet consists of Braun ambulances mounted on Ford F-450 Super Duty chassis.

== Stations and Units ==
Boston EMS Stations
Station	Assigned Units	Operating Hours	Location	Primary Response Area	Notes
Station 1	Ambulance 1 Paramedic 1	24h 24h	109 Purchase St., Downtown	Downtown	
Station 2	Ambulance 2 Paramedic 2	24h 24h	364 Warren St., Roxbury	Roxbury	
Station 3	Ambulance 3	24h	1165 Blue Hill Ave., Dorchester	Mattapan	BPD District B-3
Station P3	Paramedic 3	06:30 - 22:30	2100 Dorchester Ave., Dorchester	Dorchester/Mattapan	Carney Hospital
Station 4	Ambulance 4 Ambulance 8	24h 06:00 - 02:00	25 Harvard St., Chinatown	South End Downtown	Tufts Medical Center A8 posts to North End/Dock Square
Station 5	Ambulance 5	24h	201 Rivermoor St., West Roxbury	West Roxbury	Boston EMS Training Facility
Station 6	Ambulance 6	24h	101 West Broadway, South Boston	South Boston/Seaport	BPD District C-6
Station 7	Ambulance 7 Ambulance 27	24h 08:00 - 00:00	200 Prescott St., East Boston	East Boston	Logan Airport
Station 10	Ambulance 10	24h	69 Theodore Glynn Way, South End	Roxbury/Dorchester	
Station 11	Ambulance 11	24h	50 Gibson St., Dorchester	Dorchester	Public Works Department
Station 12	Ambulance 12 Ambulance 19 Ambulance 20 Ambulance 21	06:00 - 02:00 08:00 - 00:00 24h 24h	249 River St., Mattapan	Roxbury/Dorchester Mission Hill/Roxbury	A12 posts to Franklin Park A20 posts to Roxbury Crossing A21 posts to Codman Square
Station 13	Ambulance 13	24h	3347 Washington St., Jamaica Plain	Jamaica Plain	BPD District E-13
Station 14	Ambulance 14 Ambulance 9	24h 07:00 - 23:00	33 McDonald Ave., Allston/Brighton	Brighton Allston	A9 posts to Kenmore Sq.
Station 15	Ambulance 15	24h	512 Main St., Charlestown	Charlestown	
Station 16	Ambulance 16 Paramedic 16	06:00 - 02:00 08:00 - 00:00	330 Brookline Ave., Fenway/Kenmore	Back Bay	BIDMC Main Campus
Station 17	Ambulance 17 Paramedic 5	24h 24h	1153 Centre St., Jamaica Plain	Roslindale	Faulkner Hospital
Station 18	Ambulance 18	24h	58 Dana Ave., Hyde Park	Hyde Park	Public Works Department
Seaport Station			34 Drydock Ave., South Boston	Seaport	New station under construction

== History ==
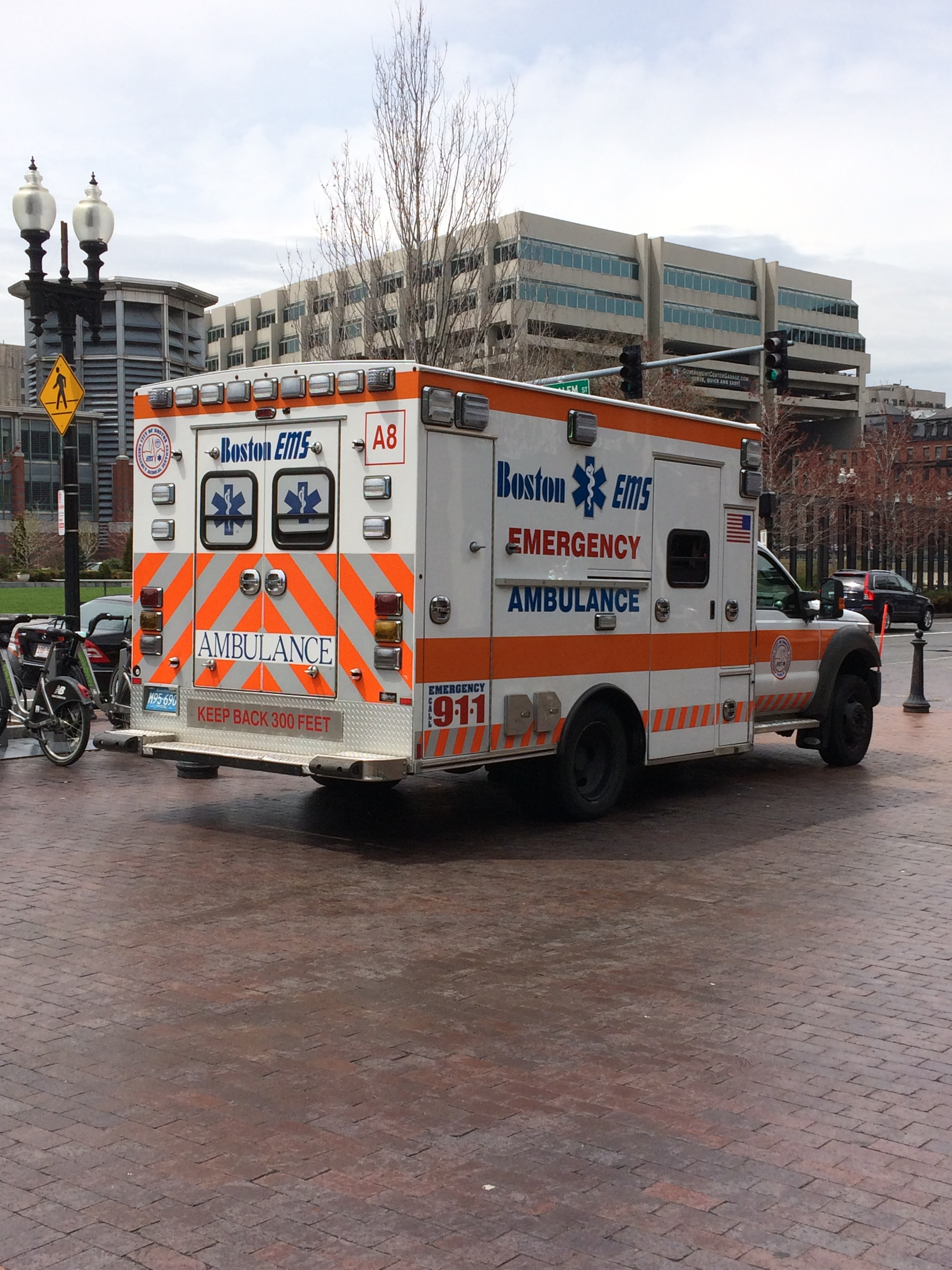
A Boston EMS ambulance

Boston EMS traces its history to the Boston City Hospital Ambulance Service, formed in 1892, and it remained a division of the City of Boston Health & Hospitals Department through 1996, at which time Boston EMS became a bureau of the newly created Boston Public Health Commission.

After 36 years of service with Boston EMS, Chief of Department Richard Serino retired in October 2009 to accept the position of Deputy Administrator of the Federal Emergency Management Agency (FEMA) after nomination and confirmation by the US Senate.

On January 25, 2010, Mayor Thomas Menino appointed Superintendent-in-Chief James Hooley, a 32 year veteran of Boston EMS as the new Chief of Department. On December 7, 2020, John Gill, a 34 year veteran of Boston EMS was appointed Superintendent in-Chief of the department.

On April 15, 2013, Boston EMS was the primary medical response agency to the Boston Marathon bombing.

The Boston EMS Regimental Pipes and Drums Corps is one of the first dedicated EMS uniformed pipe and drum bands in the United States, and was formed in 1998.

== Ranks ==
The Boston EMS rank structure is as follows:

Title	Insignia	Notes
Chief of Department		The Chief of Department is the head of the Department.The Chief of Department is responsible for overseeing day-to-day operations.The Chief of Department wears a white shirt with a gold badge and five stars.
Superintendent-in-Chief		The Superintendent-in-Chief is the second highest-ranking officer in the department.The Superintendent-In Chief wears a white shirt with a gold badge and four stars.
Superintendent		Superintendents are typically in charge of Divisions.These include Field Operations, Professional Standards, and Research, Training, and Quality Improvement (RTQI). Superintendents wear a white shirt with a gold badge and four stars.
Deputy Superintendent		Deputy Superintendents serve in operational and administrative leadership roles, including shift commanders and as leaders of functional areas such as Recruiting, Community Initiatives and Services, Field Operations, Dispatch Operations, and Research, Training, and Quality Improvement (RTQI). Deputy Superintendents wear a white shirt with a gold badge and three stars.
Captain		Captains serve in leadership roles within Boston EMS.They may be assigned to administrative and operational areas, including Research, Training, and Quality Improvement (RTQI), Professional Standards, Special Operations, and Field Operations, where they serve as Field Captains on day and evening shifts. Captains wear a white shirt with a gold badge and two bars.
Lieutenant		Lieutenants serve as supervisors of field units or supervisors of dispatch operations. They have administrative and clinical responsibility and authority over EMTs and recruits; they have administrative responsibility and authority over Paramedics. They wear a white shirt with a gold badge and one bar.
Paramedic		Paramedics are certified as emergency medical technicians at the advanced life support level, and have completed the rigorous Paramedic Internship. Paramedics wear a white shirt with a silver badge.
EMT		EMTs are certified as emergency medical technicians at the basic life support level. EMT-Basics wear a beige shirt with a silver badge.
Recruit		Recruits are members of Boston EMS who already hold EMT certification and are assigned to the Boston EMS Recruit Academy with the goal of becoming Boston EMS EMTs. During the approximately six-month academy, Recruits receive instruction in Boston EMS clinical standards, operational procedures, and local protocols, and participate in a structured physical training program designed to prepare them for the physical demands of emergency medical services operations. After completing the initial three-month academy phase, Recruits enter a supervised field internship, during which they are assigned to ambulances designated with A90-series call signs under the supervision of an experienced Field Training Officer (FTO). Recruits wear a beige shirt without a badge or certification patch.
Cadet		Cadets are members who do not yet hold EMT certification. During the program, Cadets are compensated while completing the requirements for Massachusetts EMT certification. The program combines didactic instruction, hands-on practical training, and field exposure to prepare Cadets to deliver high-quality emergency medical care. Cadets also participate in a structured physical training program designed to prepare them for the physical demands of emergency medical services operations. As part of their field observation assignments, Cadets ride alongside experienced Mentors, gaining real-world exposure to emergency responses and assisting as appropriate. The program also helps prepare Cadets for potential future roles as Boston EMS Recruits. Cadets wear a beige shirt and beige trousers.
