= Boston Municipal Protective Services =

Boston Municipal Protective Services Department

Agency overview
- Formed: 2007
- Preceding agency: Boston Municipal Police

Jurisdictional structure
- Operations jurisdiction: U.S.
- Legal jurisdiction: Municipal

Operational structure
- Headquarters: Boston City Hall, Boston, Massachusetts
- Parent agency: City of Boston Property Management Department

Website
- https://www.boston.gov/departments/property-management

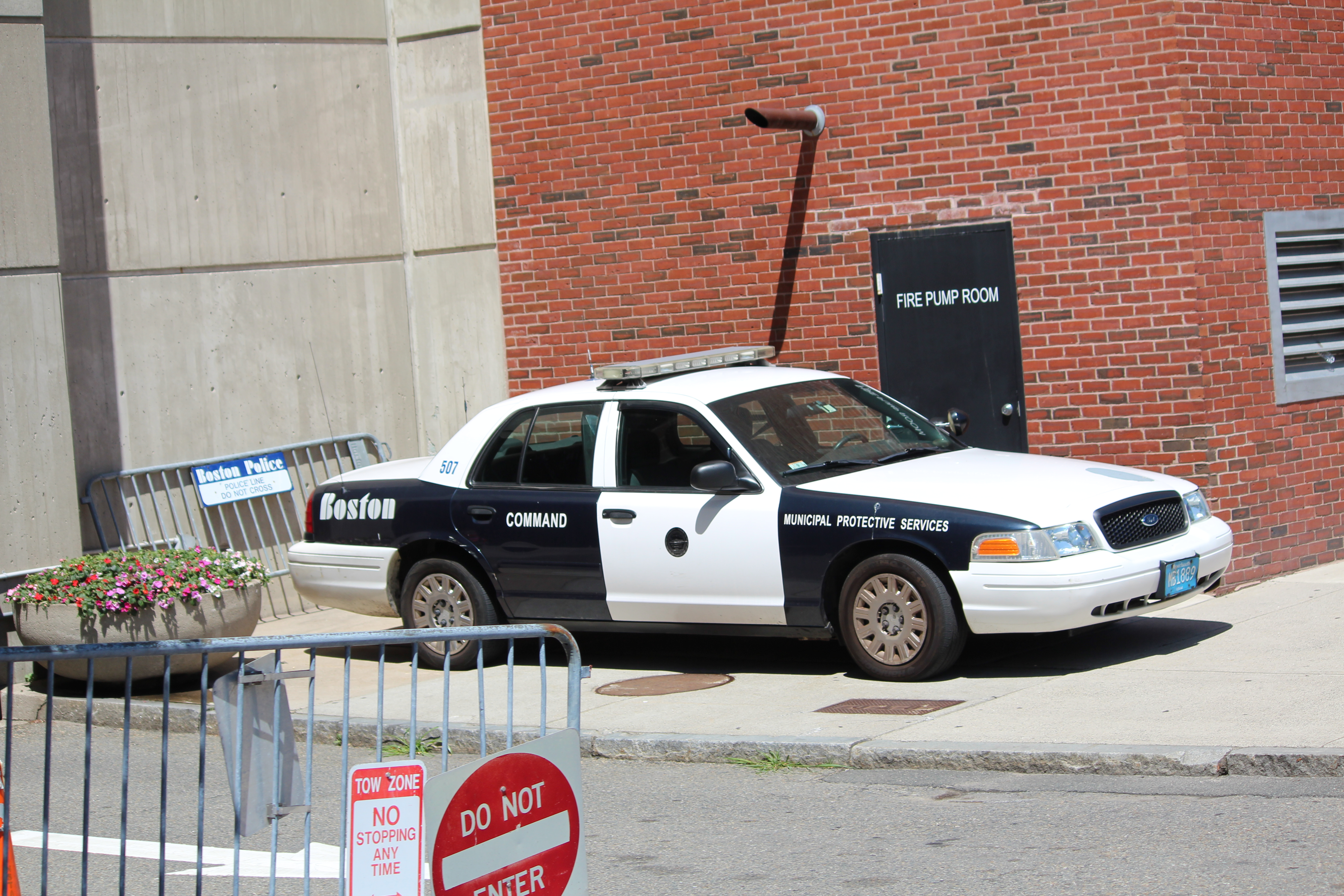
A BMPS Patrol Car

The Boston Municipal Protective Services Department (BMPS) is a former police agency that patrols properties owned and controlled by the City of Boston, the successor agency to the Boston Municipal Police (BMP). The department's primary responsibility is physical security and access control for City-owned buildings and facilities, and it operates as a division of the City's Property Management Department.

== History ==
The Boston Municipal Police originated in 1979 as the Boston Municipal Security Force within the City's Public Facilities Department; in 1994 it was renamed the Boston Municipal Police Department and moved under what is now the Property & Construction Management Department. The agency had two divisions: unarmed "site officers" and armed patrol/supervisory officers.

In mid-2006, the City advanced a plan that would dissolve the BMP and allow some municipal patrol officers to transfer laterally to the Boston Police Department; the Boston Police Patrolmen's Association (BPPA) opposed aspects of the plan. On December 28, 2006, the state's Human Resources Division approved the voluntary transfer of 33 BMP officers to the Boston Police Department; the remaining personnel were either laid off or reassigned to the new BMPS security division effective January 1, 2007. Contemporary City research also describes BMPS as an unarmed force created in 2007 under Property & Construction Management, with approximately 60 officers at the time and a Director of Security detailed from BPD.

From 2007 through mid-2021, BMPS personnel who exercised police powers did so by holding Special Police Officer licenses under Boston Police Department Rule 400/400A (a licensing scheme the City also used for other municipal units such as Boston School Police). After passage of Massachusetts police-reform legislation (S.2963) and implementation by the POST Commission, incumbent Rule 400/400A commissions required state-approved academy credentials; as a result, Boston revoked most such commissions effective July 1, 2021, leaving BMPS as an unarmed, non-sworn security service.

== Jurisdiction ==
BMP patrol officers formerly held citywide jurisdiction as sworn Special Police Officers under BPD Rule 400A. As BMPS, personnel are limited to security functions at designated City sites, and—following the 2021 reforms—do not exercise police powers unless separately commissioned under state-compliant credentials.

The main agencies and departments serviced by BMPS include the following city-owned assets:

- Boston Police Department property
- Boston Redevelopment Authority property
- Community Schools property and employees
- Community Centers property and employees
- Economic Development and Industrial Corporation (EDIC) property and employees
- Inspectional Services Department property and employees
- Library Department property and employees
- Property Management and Construction property and employees
- Neighborhood Development property and employees
- Boston Public Schools Central Administration Building
- The City of Boston Cemeteries
- The city's Parks and Recreation facilities and employees
- The Boston Transportation Department property and employees

== See also ==
- Boston Police Department
