= Boston Police Department =

Municipal police department in Boston, Massachusetts

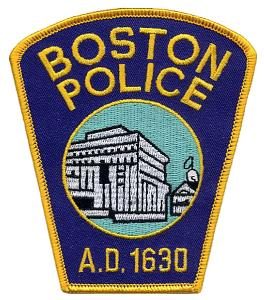
- Patch of Boston Police Department

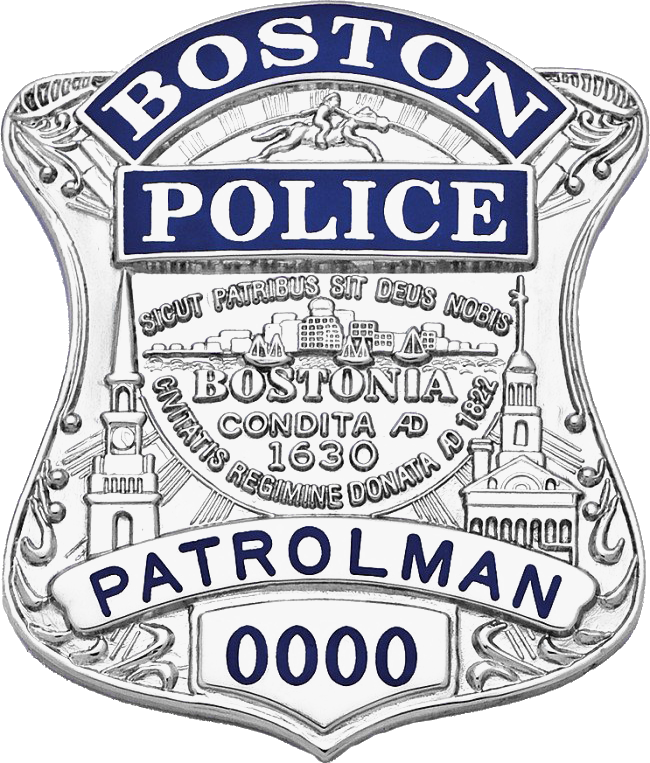
- Badge of Boston Police Department

- Flag of the City of Boston
- Abbreviation: BPD

Agency overview
- Formed: May 26, 1854; 172 years ago
- Employees: 2,713
- Annual budget: $414 million (2020)

Jurisdictional structure
- Operations jurisdiction: Massachusetts, U.S.
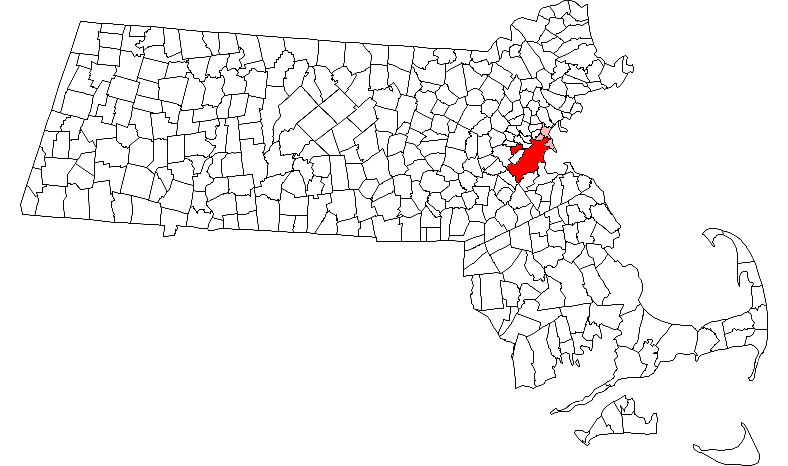
- Map of Boston Police Department's jurisdiction
- Area: 89.6 square miles (232 km^{2})
- Population: 675,000 (2020 census)
- Legal jurisdiction: Boston, Massachusetts
- General nature: Local civilian police

Operational structure
- Headquarters: Boston, Massachusetts
- Police Officers: ▼2,000 of 2,500-3,000 (2024)
- Civilian members: 569 Civilian Members
- Mayor of Boston responsible: Michelle Wu
- Agency executive: Michael A. Cox, Commissioner

Facilities
- Patrol vehicles: Ford Police Interceptor Utility, Ford Expedition, Ford F-250
- Patrol cars: Ford Crown Victoria Police Interceptor, Chevrolet Caprice PPV
- K-9s: 33

Website
- police.boston.gov

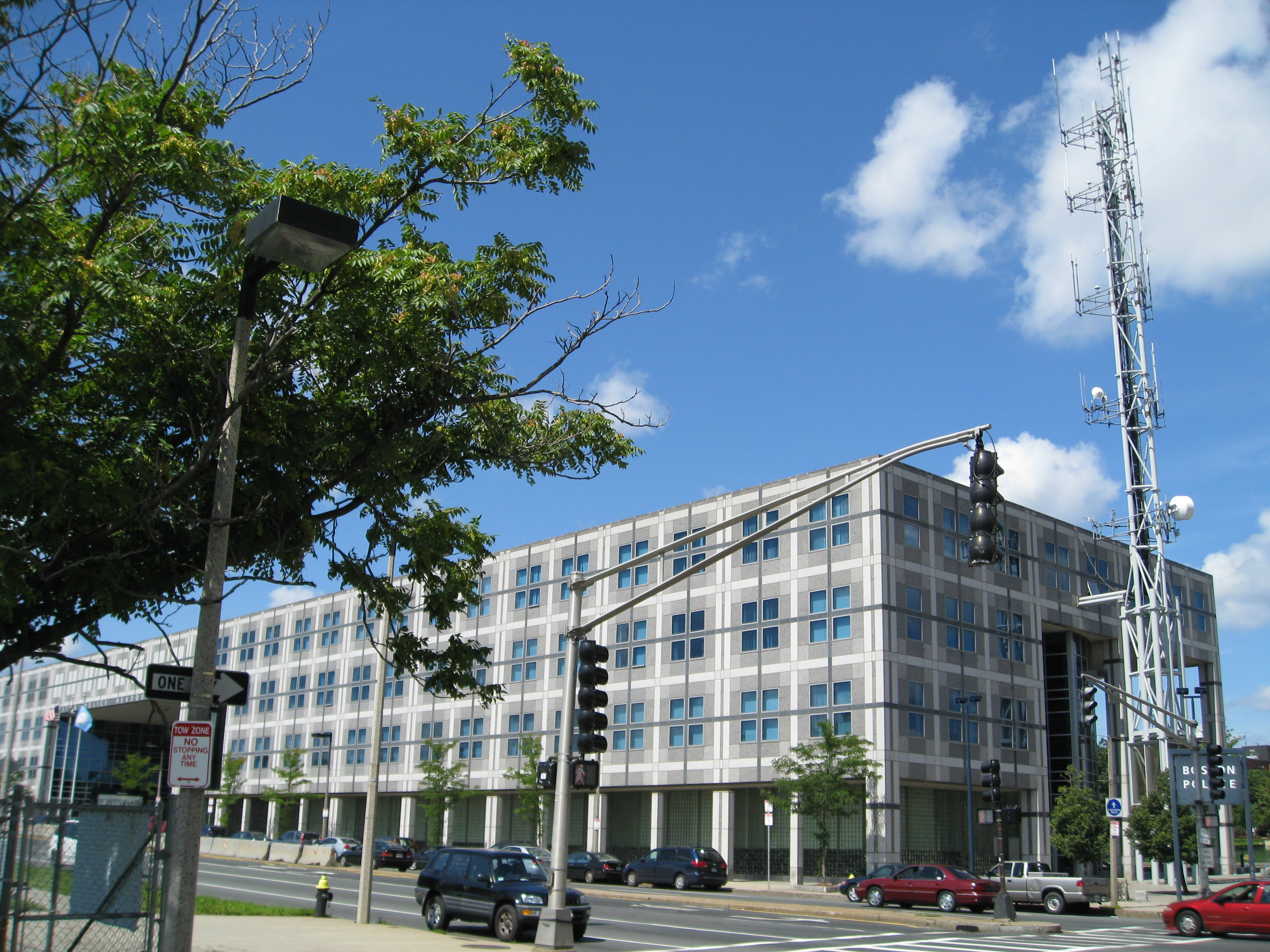
Police headquarters

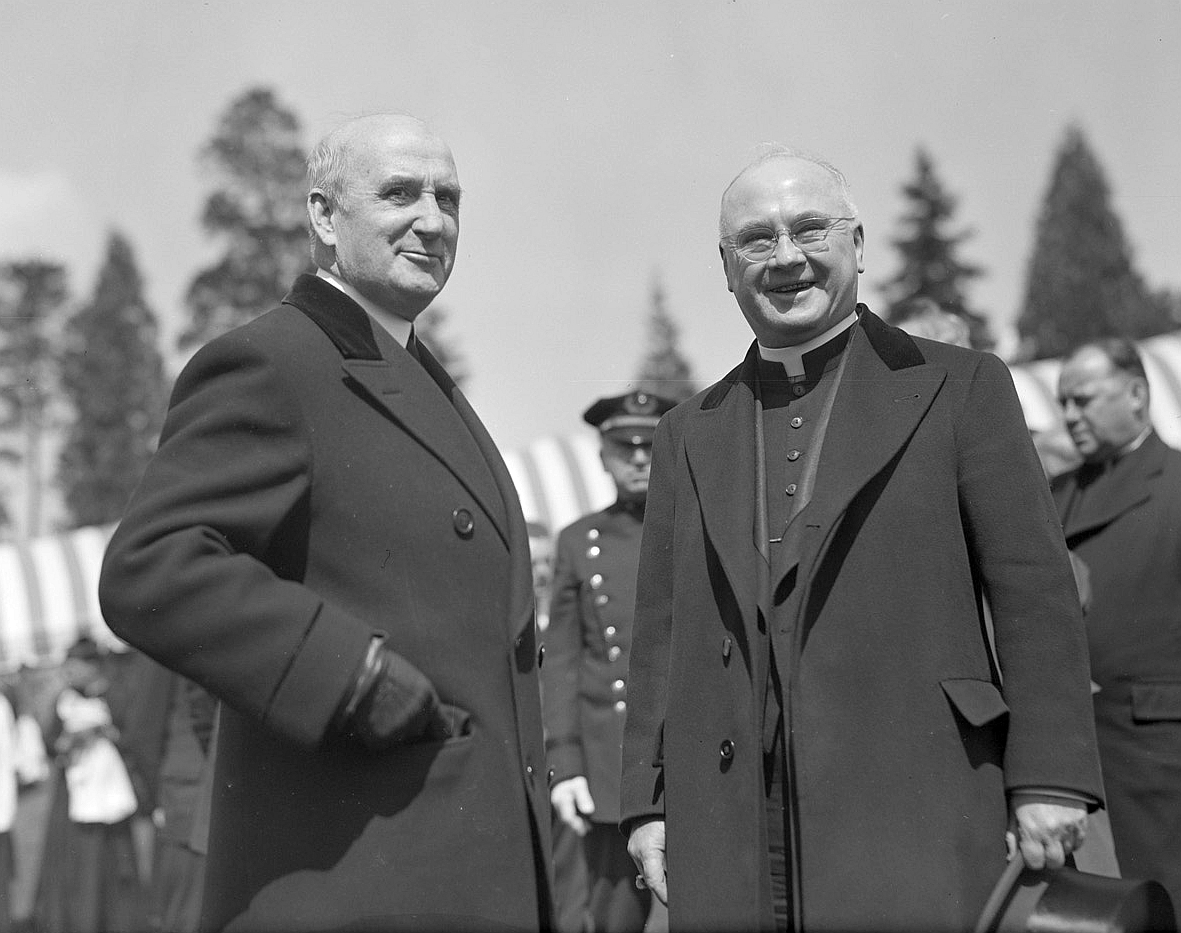
Police Commissioner Thomas F. Sullivan (left), 1944

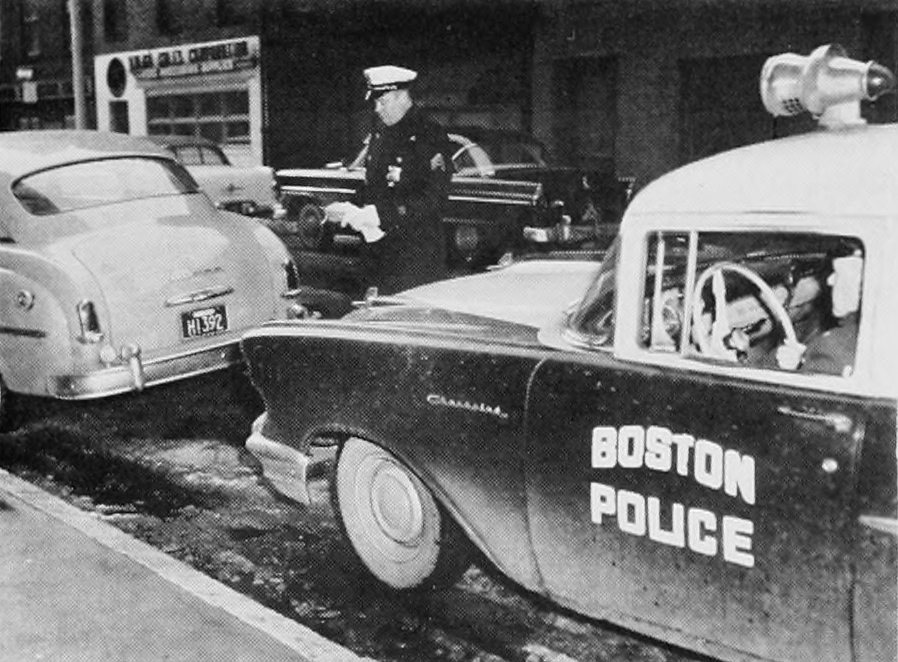
Investigating an abandoned stolen vehicle, 1958

The Boston Police Department (BPD) is the primary law enforcement agency of Boston, Massachusetts, United States. Founded in 1854, the BPD is the oldest municipal police department in the United States. It is also the 20th largest law enforcement agency in the country, with 2,713 sworn and unsworn personnel.

== History ==
=== Pre-incorporation (1635–1828) ===
Before the existence of a formal police department, the first night watch was established in Boston in 1635. In 1703, pay in the sum of 35 shillings a month was set for members of the night watch. In 1796, the watch was reorganized, and the watchmen carried a badge of office, a rattle, and a six-foot pole, which was painted blue and white with a hook on one end and a bill on the other. The hook was used to grab fleeing criminals, and the rounded "bill" was used as a weapon. The rattle was a noise-making device used for calling for assistance.

The Day Police, which had no connection to the night watch, was organized in 1838. The Day Police operated under the city marshal and had six appointed officers. This organization would eventually lead to the establishment of the modern-day Boston Police Department.

=== Nineteenth century ===
In 1838, a bill passed in the General Court that allowed the city to appoint police officers, paving the way for the creation of a formal police department. The Boston Police Department was formally founded in May 1854, at which point both the night watch and Day Police were disbanded. A 14-inch club replaced the old hook and bill, which had been in use for 154 years. At the time of its founding, the Boston Police constituted one of the first paid, professional police services in the United States. The department was closely organized and modeled after Sir Robert Peel's (London) Metropolitan Police Service.

On November 3, 1851, the first Irish-born Boston Police officer, Bernard "Barney" McGinniskin, was appointed. His presence generated considerable controversy. The Boston Pilot wrote, "He is the first Irishman that ever carried the stick of a policeman anywhere in this country, and meetings, even Faneuil Hall meetings, have been held to protect against the appointment." At the time, the police salary of $2.00 a day for the morning and afternoon beat and $1.20 for the night watch was nearly twice as high as the wages of laborers. City Marshal Francis Tukey resisted mayor John Prescott Bigelow's appointment of McGinniskin, expressing the predominant anti-Irish sentiments in the city by arguing it was done at "the expense of an American." On January 5, 1852, shortly before the newly elected mayor Benjamin Seaver (who had been supported by Tukey) took office, Tukey fired McGinniskin without giving a reason. After criticism in the press, Seaver reinstated McGinniskin, who remained in the police until the 1854 anti-Irish groundswell of the Know Nothing/American Party movement, when in the words of the Boston Pilot, "Mr. McGinniskin was discharged from the Boston Police for no other reason than he was a Catholic and born in Ireland." McGinniskin became a United States inspector at the customhouse and died of rheumatism on March 2, 1868. McGinniskin is buried in the St. Augustine Cemetery in South Boston.

On October 18, 1857, at about 5:15 a.m., Boston Police Officer Ezekiel W. Hodsdon was patrolling the corner of Havre and Maverick Street in East Boston. Hodsdon attempted to arrest two suspects for a burglary. A struggle ensued, and one of the suspects was able to get behind Hodsdon and shoot him in the head. Hodsdon died about 10:00 A.M., becoming the first Boston police officer killed in the line of duty. He was 25 years old. The murderers fled. Thousands of people visited the station house to view the body. Hodsdon left behind his wife Lydia and infant son Ezekiel, who was born just 13 days prior to his death. He was buried in Woodlawn Cemetery in Everett, according to Boston Globe newspaper reports on October 19, 1857. On October 18, 2007, a memorial was held in honor of Hodsdon on the corner of Havre and Maverick Streets in East Boston. On July 14, 1863, Boston Mayor Frederic W. Lincoln Jr. (1858–1861 & 1863–1867) ordered all 330 officers in the Department to quell a draft riot among Irish Catholics attempting to raid Union armories in the North End.

In 1871, the Boston Police Relief Association was founded. The purpose of the Boston Relief Association is intended to provide support and relief for officers of the Boston Police Department and their families. It was incorporated under the statutes of Massachusetts in 1876.

The Boston Police Department appointed Horatio J. Homer, its first African American officer, on December 24, 1878. He was promoted to sergeant in 1895. Sgt. Homer retired on Jan 29, 1919, after 40 years of service. He and his wife, Lydia Spriggs Homer, are buried at Evergreen Cemetery in Brighton, MA. On June 26, 2010, the Boston Police Department dedicated a gravestone in honor of Sgt. Homer's service.

=== 20th century ===
==== 1910s ====
On September 9, 1919, when Police Commissioner Edwin Upton Curtis refused to allow the creation of a police union, 1,117 BPD officers went on strike. This signaled a dramatic shift in traditional labor relations and views on the part of the police, who were unhappy with stagnant wages and poor working conditions. The city soon fell into riots and public chaos as over three-fourths of the department was no longer enforcing public peace. Governor Calvin Coolidge intervened to quash further chaos. Coolidge announced that the police did not have the right to strike against the public safety and brought in the state National Guard to restore order to Boston. The strike was broken, permanently, when Coolidge hired replacement police officers, many of whom were returning servicemen from World War I, and the former officers were refused re-entry into the department. Ironically, the new officers hired in the wake of the strike received higher salaries, more vacation days and city-provided uniforms, the very demands the original strikers were requesting. The BPD strike set a precedent for further movements to stymie police unionization around the country.

Coolidge's intervention in the strike brought him national fame, which, in turn, led to his nomination as Harding's running mate for vice-president in the 1920 presidential election.

==== 1920s ====
In 1921, Irene McAuliffe, daughter of the late Weston police chief and horse breeder Patrick McAuliffe, was among the first six female members of the Boston Police Department. An accomplished horsewoman, she was sworn in as a mounted officer of the Weston Police Department in 1913 during the town's bicentennial celebration. She joined the District of Columbia Police Department in 1920, and in 1921 she became a member of the Boston Police Department's Vice Squad.

==== 1930s ====
On May 29, 1930, Oliver Garrett was charged with 152 counts of conspiracy, extortion, and receiving gratuities for crimes allegedly committed as leader of BPD's liquor-raiding unit during Prohibition. Commissioner Herbert A. Wilson, who had conducted a secret investigation into Garrett two years earlier and had overrode his subordinates to grant Garrett a questionable disability pension, was removed from office by the Governor Frank G. Allen and the Massachusetts Governor's Council. On May 7, 1931, Garrett pleaded to guilty and was sentenced to two years in the Deer Island House of Correction and fined $100.

==== 1960s ====
In 1965, the largest police union representing Boston police employees, the Boston Police Patrolmen's Association, was formed.

===== School desegregation busing crisis =====
In 1974 and 1975, the BPD was involved in maintaining order during the public disturbance over court-ordered busing, which was intended to racially desegregate Boston's public school system. The protest of white citizens escalated into street battles in 1974, and in 1975 uniformed BPD officers were stationed inside South Boston High School, Charlestown High School and other Boston public schools.

==== 1980s ====
===== 1982 Boston arson spree =====
Between 1982 and 1984, an arson ring that included BPD officers and allies set fire to 264 buildings. The ring opposed Proposition 2½, which reduced the funds that Massachusetts municipalities could raise through property taxes and led to cuts in fire departments and police agencies. Through committing arson, the ring hoped to cause social disorder to make the case for the necessity of firefighters and police.

FBI Inquiry in Boston Police Department

At some point in 1986, the FBI inquired into the Boston Police Department, uncovering massive amounts of bribery between sworn officers, some members of the city's liquor licensing board and other private individuals involved in payoffs. According to other law enforcement agencies that were in on the investigation, they stated that "it was one of the largest ever investigations conducted in a major city police force and would disclose a widespread pattern of bribery of police officers reaching into senior levels of the Boston Police Department." These bribes would be paid to officers in exchange for looking the other way on liquor license violations and not making arrests for certain missed court dates due to said liquor violations. The inquiry resulted in the arrests of 7 detectives and former detectives of the Boston Police Department, including 3 active detectives (Matthew A. Kilroe, John F. McCormick, and Kenneth J. Nave) and 4 former detectives (Peter Boylan, John E. Carey, Thomas J. Connolly, and Francis X. Sheehan). All of these men were charged in a RICO case, with 20 years and $250,000 each for racketeering and extortion counts.

==== Charles Stuart murder investigation ====
In 1989, Charles Stuart killed his wife and accused an unknown black man for the murder. BPD proceeded to conduct a manhunt targeting young black men, indiscriminately using stop and frisk tactics, especially in neighborhoods of Mission Hill and Roxbury. Some residents compared the response to living in a war zone and the response is said to have contributed to distrust between black communities and BPD for decades following.

==== 1990s ====
===== Federal fingerprinting coordination =====
On August 23, 1995, the BPD became the first police agency to send fingerprint images to the FBI electronically using the newly created EFIPS (now IAFIS) system. The first set of fingerprints was for a suspect arrested for armed robbery. Within hours of the receipt of the fingerprints, the FBI determined that the suspect had a number of prior arrests, including one for assault with intent to kill.

=== 21st century ===
On December 31, 2006, 31 Boston Municipal Police Officers were allowed to transfer to the Boston Police. On January 1, 2007, the rest of the Munis were either laid off or transferred to the city's Municipal Protective Services, which provides security to the city's Property Management Department. There was no merger with the Boston Municipal Police.

The transfer of Munis was planned in mid-2006 by Mayor Thomas M. Menino. This plan was met with heavy protest from the Boston Police Patrolmen's Association (BPPA). The BPPA's argument was that the Municipal officers were not qualified to be Boston police officers due to lack of training, political patronage, nepotism, and the fact that the Munis were not civil service tested.

==== 2000s ====
===== 2007 Boston Bomb Scare =====
On January 31, 2007, 911 callers mistakenly identified small electronic promotions found throughout Boston and the surrounding cities of Cambridge and Somerville as possible explosives. Upon investigation by Boston Police and other agencies, the suspicious devices turned out to be battery-powered LED placards with an image of a cartoon character called a "mooninite" used in a guerrilla marketing campaign for Aqua Teen Hunger Force Colon Movie Film For Theaters, a film based on the animated television series Aqua Teen Hunger Force on Cartoon Network's late-night programming block Adult Swim.

The BPD's handling of this incident has been criticized by some Boston residents and justified by others: One resident said that the police response was "silly and insane," and that "We're the laughing stock." Another resident said that the device "looked like a bomb. I picked it up, pulled the tape off it, and there were batteries, two on the top and three on the bottom." The same devices had been distributed in nine other cities across the USA without provoking a similar reaction. The United States Department of Homeland Security praised Boston authorities "for sharing their knowledge quickly with Washington officials and the public."

==== 2010s ====
===== Occupy Boston Movement =====
Beginning in September–October 2011, protesters assembled in Dewey Square as a show of solidarity with the Occupy Wall Street protest in New York. In the early hours of October 11, 2011, Boston Police and Transit Police moved into the protesters' secondary camp, arresting approximately 100 protesters. Protesters reported numerous incidents of police brutality. Mayor Menino denied the reports and claimed that the protesters endangered public safety.

In 2018, Mayor Marty Walsh announced that Boston Police Department would be adding five Americorps members as part of a partnership with the Police Assisted Addiction and Recovery Initiative. The Americorps members were trained recovery coaches and helped the police refer individuals in the community into treatment and recovery for substance use disorder.

===== Boston Marathon bombing =====
The BPD responded to the Boston Marathon bombing in 2013.

==== 2020s ====
===== 2020 Black Lives Matter riots =====
During the 2020 George Floyd riot, the department came under scrutiny by elected officials for its usage of tear gas against civilians. Demonstrations against police brutality began in the city in May 2020 and continued through June.

===== Overtime fraud cases =====
In early September 2020, United States Attorney Andrew Lelling indicted nine former and current Boston police officers for allegedly collecting more than $200,000 in fraudulent overtime payments while working in the department's evidence warehouse.

In 2024, 7 Boston police officers were paid over $500,000, although there were no mentions of charges being filed.

===== Alleged child rapist as union president =====
In April 2021, The Boston Globe reported that a 1995 internal investigation by the BPD concluded that Patrick M. Rose Sr., a BPD patrolman, had likely sexually assaulted a 12-year-old child. The BPD did not act on that finding. Instead, Rose kept his badge, served for another 21 years, and was elected president of the Boston Police Patrolmen's Association. He was ultimately arrested and on November 20, 2020, Rose was indicted in Suffolk County Superior Court on thirty-three counts related to sexual assault of children, including sixteen counts of child rape. During his time in the BPD, the department did nothing to limit his interactions with children, including allowing Rose to work on child sexual assault cases.

===== Commissioner White termination =====
Following the abrupt resignation of commissioner William G. Gross at the end of January 2021, mayor Marty Walsh quickly named superintendent Dennis White to succeed Gross. White was sworn in on February 1, 2021. Two days later, White was placed on leave due to "the handling of a 1999 allegation of domestic violence" against White coming to light. The city of Boston subsequently hired an independent attorney to conduct an investigation; meanwhile, Walsh resigned as mayor upon his confirmation as United States Secretary of Labor. Results of the investigation were released in mid-May, followed by several legal actions by White's attorney seeking to block the city from terminating White. Ultimately, acting mayor Kim Janey fired White on June 7, 2021.

== Departmental organization ==
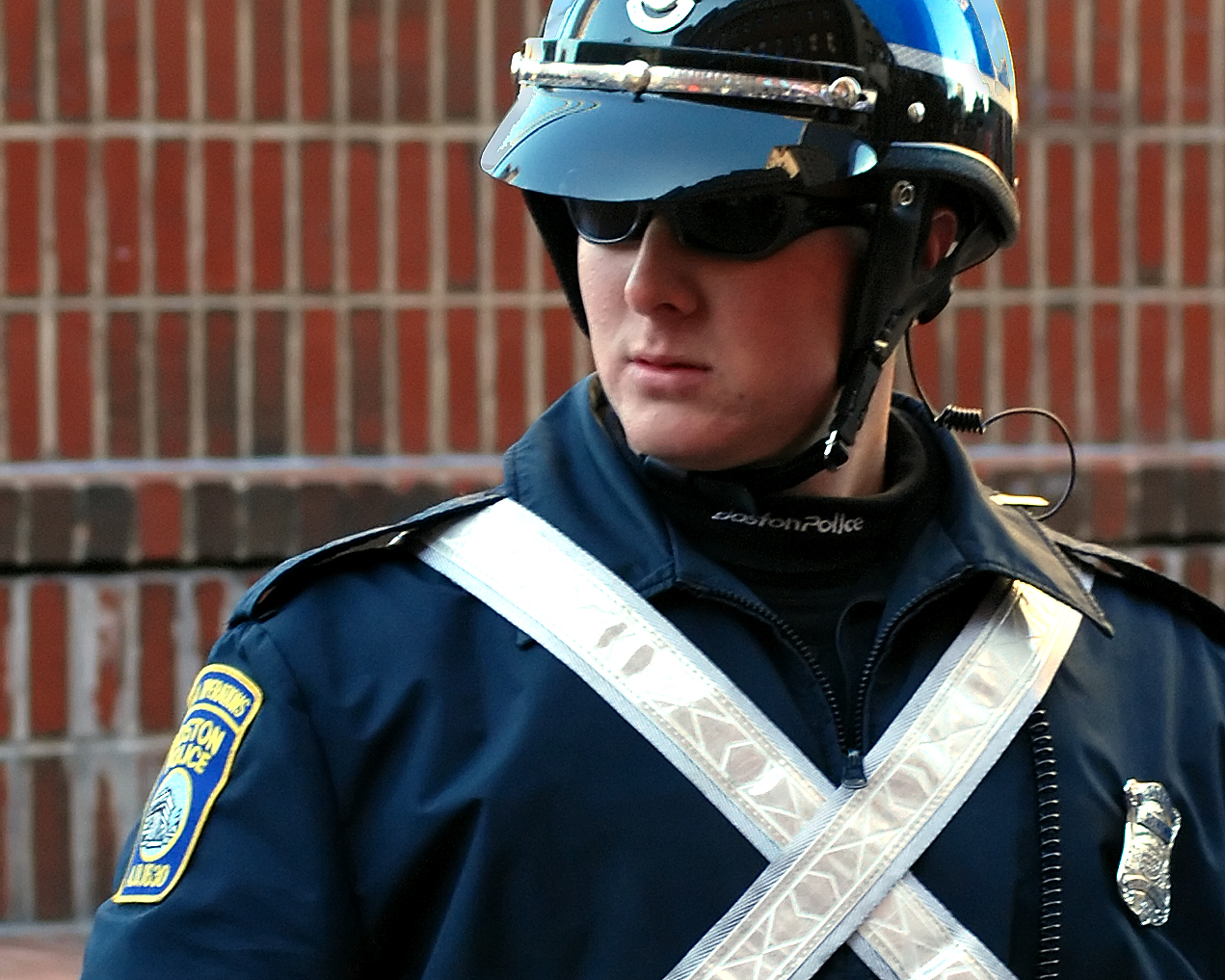
A Boston Police Special Operations officer

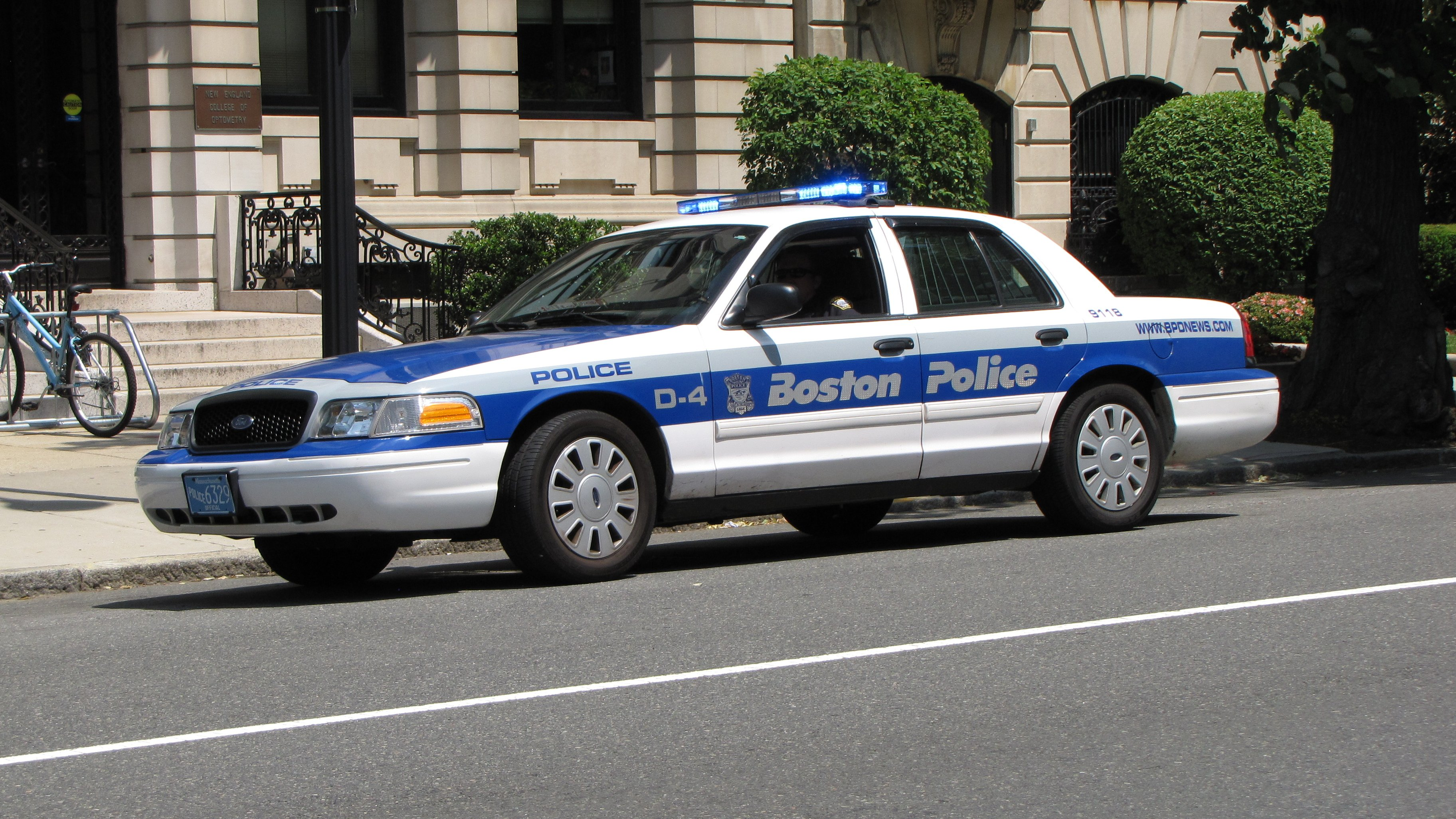
A Boston Police cruiser on Beacon Street

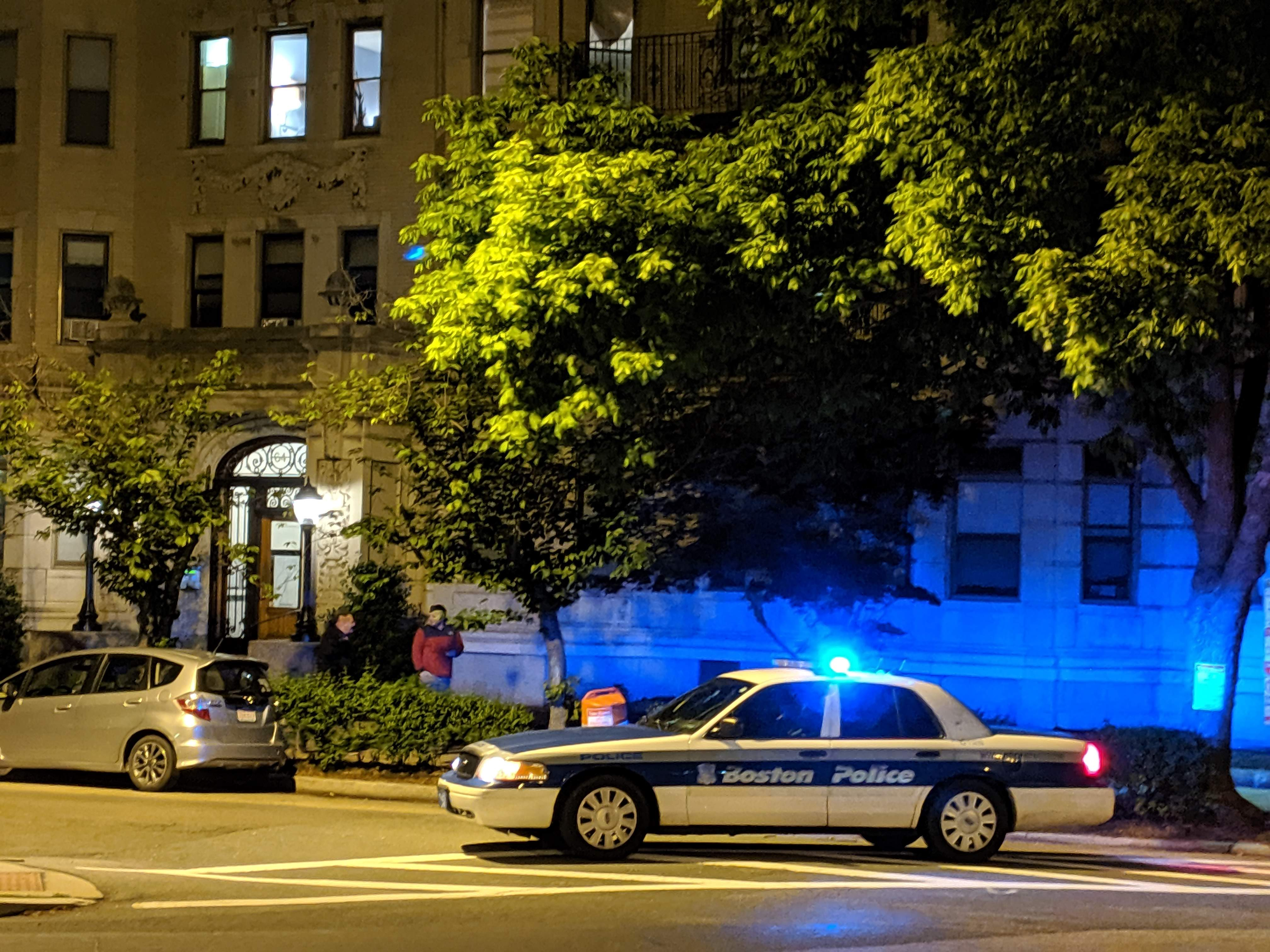
Boston Police cruiser near Berklee College of Music

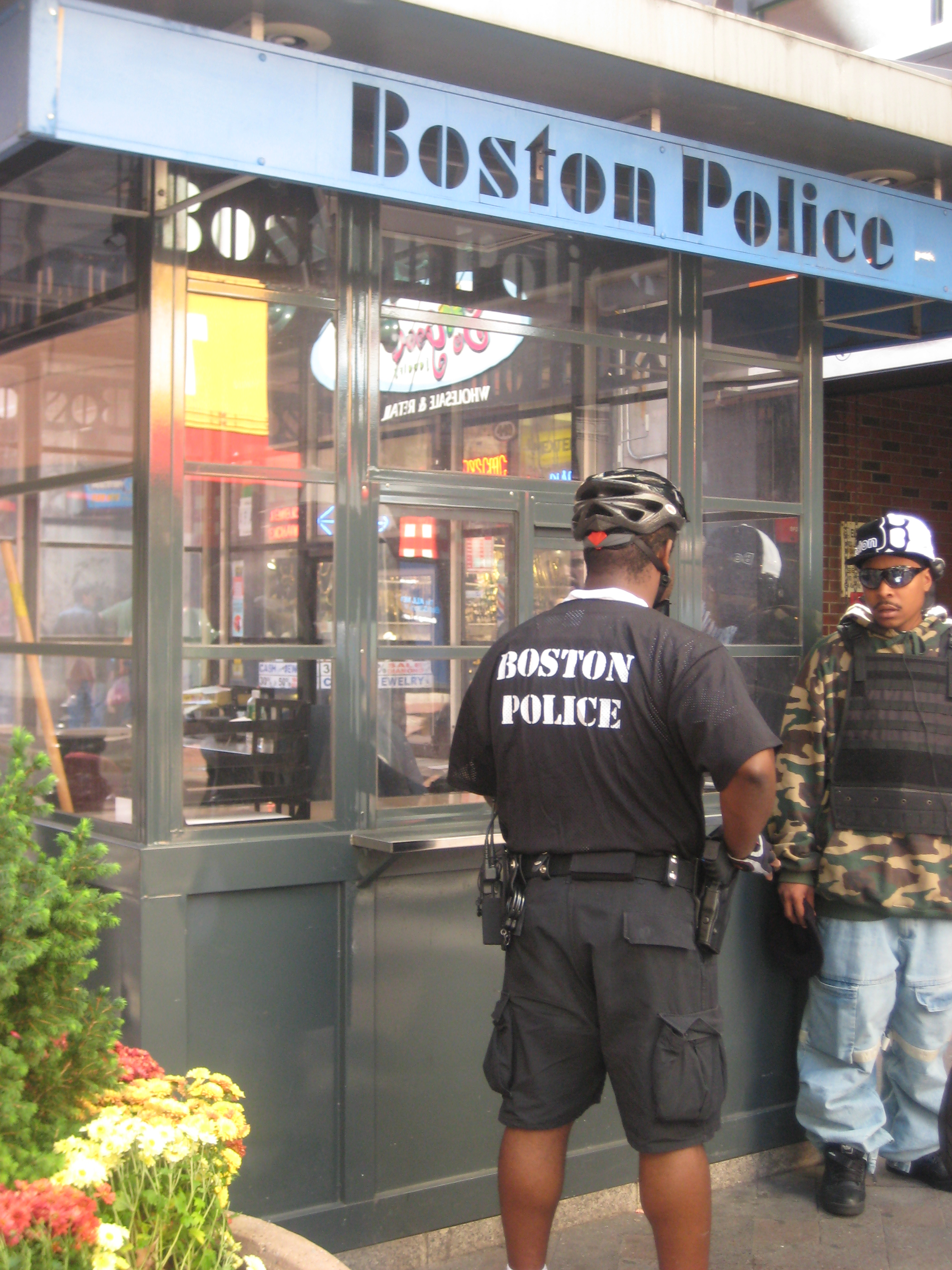
Boston Police Department kiosk in Downtown Crossing

The Boston Police Department has approximately 2,015 officers and 808 civilian personnel, with patrol services covering an area of 89.6 mi^{2} (232.1 km^{2}) and a population of 675,000. Like all City of Boston departments, the BPD requires all employed officers hired since 1995 to live within Boston city limits. The BPD is divided into three zones and 11 neighborhood districts spread across the city, with each zone supervised by a Deputy Superintendent and every district headed by a Captain.

=== Ranks ===
The Boston Police rank structure is as follows:

Title	Insignia	Notes
Commissioner (civilian)		The Commissioner is appointed by the Mayor of Boston. The Commissioner is the executive head of the department. The Commissioner does not have any type of Insignia.
Superintendent-in-Chief		Superintendent-in-Chief is the highest-ranking police officer in the department. This position is not always filled. The Superintendent-in-Chief wears five stars on his or her uniform shirt.
Superintendent		Superintendents are typically in charge of a Bureau, or they can be the director of the academy. The Superintendent wears four stars on his or her uniform shirt.
Deputy Superintendent		Deputy Superintendents are typically second-in-command of a Bureau, or they are the deputy director of the academy. Deputy Superintendents wear three stars on their uniform shirt.
Captain		Captains are typically commanders in charge of a district, a unit commander in academy, or service chief in the department administration, and act as detective officers if needed. Captains wear pairs of railroad bars on their uniform shirt.
Lieutenant		Lieutenants hold the function of second-in-command in a district, or Unit leader in a district, or service chief in the department administration, or instructor in the academy, and can act as detective officers in the Department. Lieutenants wear a single bar on their uniform shirt.
Sergeant/Sergeant Detective		Sergeants have the functions of district sergeant, or they are a unit deputy chief in a district, or they are staff sergeants in the department administration, or they are instructors in the academy. They are also responsible for supporting detectives where needed. Sergeants wear three chevrons on their uniform shirt sleeves.
Detective		Detective is a rank that is guaranteed by a Legislative Act of 1986. They work in plainclothes and hold the function of an investigator.
Police Officer		Police Officers are the first ranking officers.
* Certain jobs within the department are designated as Detective Supervisor jobs (District Det. Supervisor, Sexual Assault Unit, Domestic Violence, etc.). Detective Supervisors earn their "rating" after serving a certain amount of time in said role and are referred to as their rank followed by "detective" (i.e. sergeant detective, lieutenant detective, etc.)		* Deputy Superintendents and above serve at the pleasure of the Police Commissioner and in the case of the Commissioner, the Mayor.

=== Leadership ===
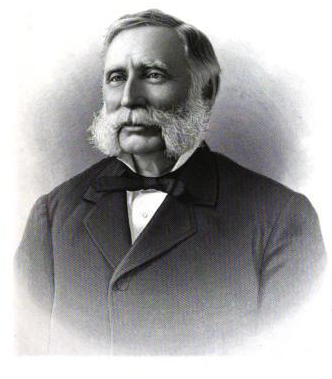
Nathaniel Wales

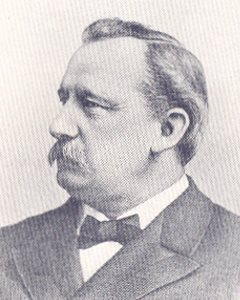
Augustus P. Martin

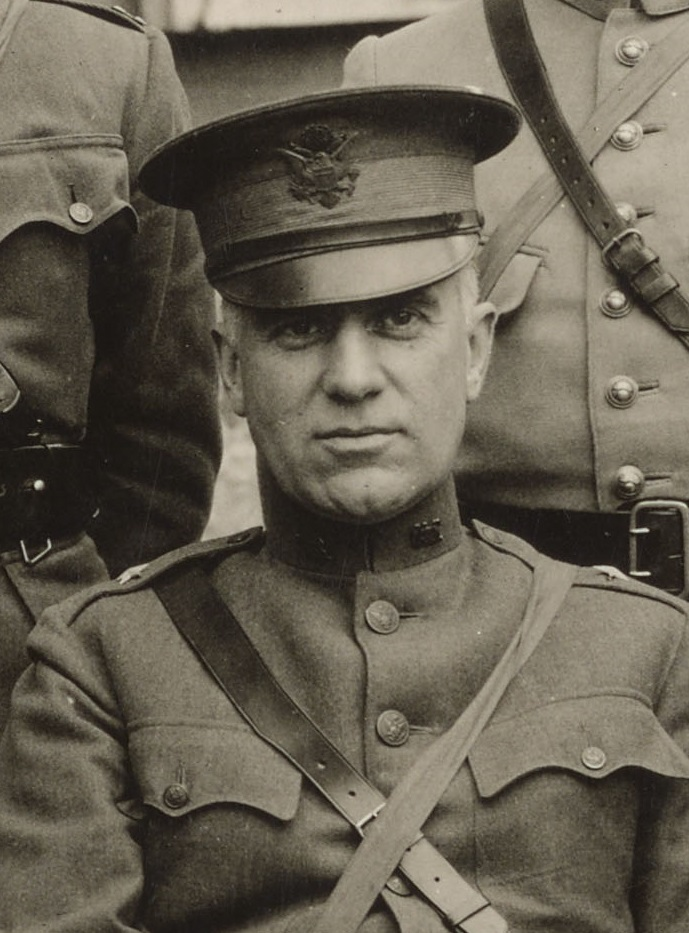
Charles H. Cole

Dennis White was appointed as commissioner on February 1, 2021; he was placed on leave on February 3, 2021. Gregory P. Long has been the superintendent-in-chief since August 2018; he was named acting commissioner upon White being placed on leave.

Kathleen O'Toole was the first woman to serve as commissioner, from February 2004 through May 2006 when she left to take a new position as Chief Inspector of the Inspectorate of the Irish national police force, the Garda Síochána.

==== Members of the Boston Police Commission ====
A three-person police commission (also called the police board) consisted of members nominated by the Governor of Massachusetts and approved by the Massachusetts Governor's Council. The commission was established in 1878 and abolished in 1906.

Name	Term start	Term end
Henry S. Russell	July 8, 1878	March 1, 1880
Samual R. Spinney	July 8, 1878	May 3, 1880
James M. Bugbee	July 8, 1878	May 5, 1879
Henry Walker	May 5, 1879	April 21, 1882
Edward J. Jones	March 26, 1880	April 21, 1882
Thomas J. Gargan	May 3, 1880	April 21, 1882
Thomas L. Jerks	April 22, 1882	July 23, 1885
Nathaniel Wales	April 22, 1882	July 7, 1885
Benjamin D. Barley	April 22, 1882	May 6, 1883
Michael P. Curran	May 7, 1883	July 23, 1885
Albert T. Whiting	July 2, 1885	May 6, 1895
William H. Lee	July 23, 1885	May 28, 1894
William M. Osborne	July 23, 1885	April 30, 1893
Robert F. Clark	May 1, 1893	May 4, 1903
Augustus P. Martin	May 28, 1894	May 1, 1899
Charles P. Curtis Jr.	May 6, 1895	May 1, 1905
Harry F. Adams	May 1, 1899	June 4, 1906
William H. Emmons	May 5, 1903	June 4, 1906
Charles H. Cole	May 1, 1905	June 4, 1906

==== List of Boston Police Commissioners ====
Boston's police commissioner was appointed by the Governor until 1962. Edmund L. McNamara was the first commissioner to be appointed by the mayor of Boston, taking office in April 1962 via appointment by mayor John F. Collins. Once appointed, a commissioner can only be removed from the position for cause until their term expires. A commissioner may be appointed to a five-year term, or to serve the remainder of a predecessor's five-year term.

Names in italics indicate a person served as acting (interim) commissioner only. Since 1985, several acting commissioners have been sworn in as permanent. Numbering is per cited contemporary news reports and may include inconsistencies.

No.	Name	Acting		Sworn / permanent		Ref.
No.	Name	Term start	Term end	Term start	Term end	Ref.
1	Stephen O'Meara			June 4, 1906	December 14, 1918	
	Michael H. Crowley	December 14, 1918	December 30, 1918			
2	Edwin Upton Curtis			December 30, 1918	March 28, 1922	
	Michael H. Crowley	March 28, 1922	April 3, 1922			
3	Herbert A. Wilson			April 3, 1922	May 5, 1930	
	Michael H. Crowley	May 5, 1930	May 8, 1930			
4	Eugene Hultman			May 8, 1930	December 27, 1934	
5	Joseph J. Leonard			December 27, 1934	February 23, 1935	
6	Eugene M. McSweeney			February 23, 1935	November 25, 1936	
7	Joseph F. Timilty			November 25, 1936 (took office); June 5, 1943 (reinstated)	March 27, 1943 (suspended); November 25, 1943 (term ended)	
	Thomas S. J. Kavanagh	March 27, 1943	June 5, 1943			
8	Thomas F. Sullivan			November 26, 1943	August 27, 1957	
	James F. Daley	August 27, 1957	September 4, 1957			
9	Leo J. Sullivan			September 4, 1957	March 15, 1962	
	Francis J. Hennessy	March 15, 1962	April 6, 1962			
10	Edmund L. McNamara			April 6, 1962	May 31, 1972	
	William J. Taylor	May 31, 1972	November 1, 1972			
11	Robert diGrazia			November 1, 1972	November 15, 1976	
12	Joseph M. Jordan			November 15, 1976	January 31, 1985	
13	Francis Roache	February 1, 1985	March 13, 1985	March 13, 1985	June 30, 1993	
14	William Bratton			June 30, 1993	January 10, 1994	
15	Paul F. Evans	January 10, 1994	February 14, 1994	February 14, 1994	November 14, 2003	
	James Hussey	November 14, 2003	February 19, 2004			
16	Kathleen O'Toole			February 19, 2004	May 31, 2006	
	Al Goslin	May 31, 2006	December 5, 2006			
17	Ed Davis			December 5, 2006	November 1, 2013	
18	William B. Evans	November 1, 2013	January 9, 2014	January 9, 2014	August 4, 2018	
19	William G. Gross	August 4, 2018	August 6, 2018	August 6, 2018	January 29, 2021	
20	Dennis White	January 29, 2021	February 1, 2021	February 1, 2021	February 3, 2021 (suspended); June 7, 2021 (terminated)	
	Gregory Long	February 3, 2021	August 15, 2022			
21	Michael Cox			August 15, 2022	incumbent	

==== Special operations unit ====
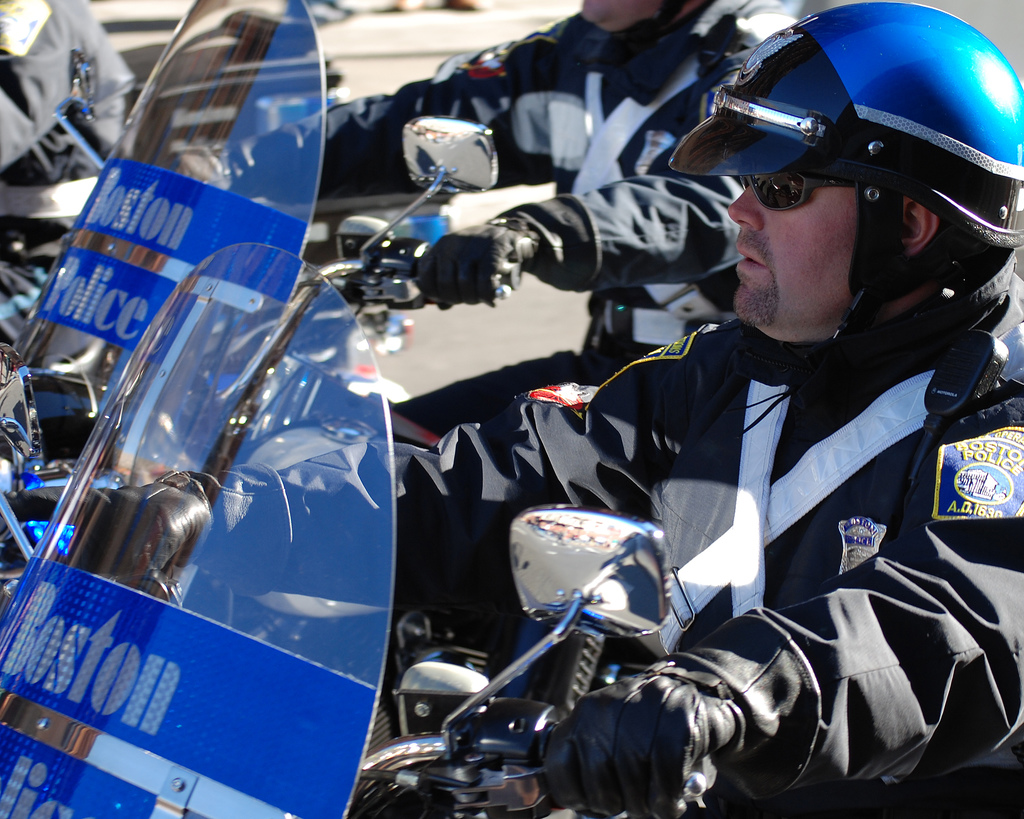
A member of the special operations unit

The Boston Police Special Operations Unit is a specialized unit within the Boston Police Department responsible for combined duties involving Highway Patrol and traffic enforcement, crowd control, and special weapons and tactics (SWAT) services within the city.

One unique feature of the unit is that the Special Operations Unit primarily relies on the use of Ford Crown Victoria Police Interceptors and Harley-Davidsons in their daily patrols. The use of motorcycles allows the unit to perform routine traffic enforcement; accompany parades, crowds, and visiting dignitaries; and to quickly travel to situations wherein the unit's SWAT skills are requested. Specialized trucks and support vehicles are also used to transport equipment and officers when needed.

The Canine unit with twenty-seven patrol/narcotics and EOD dogs, and the Bomb (EOD) Squad is also under the Special Operations Division.

From 1873 to 2009, the department also featured a mounted unit, which was a part of the Bureau of Special Operations. Budgetary pressures in the latter year, however, resulted in the unit's disbandment. Despite vows by the city's political leadership that the unit would be reconstituted once the city's fiscal picture brightened, as of this date, that has not happened.

The Boston Police also formerly had a police aviation unit. (A Boston Police helicopter was featured in the opening credits of the Boston-based television series Spenser: For Hire.) The unit was disbanded in 1990 during a city and state fiscal crisis. The Massachusetts State Police now provides the BPD with aviation support when necessary.

== Equipment ==
=== Transportation ===
The Boston Police uses the following vehicles.

- Ford Police Interceptor Utility – Current issue patrol car. They own 10 new 2025 patrol cars)
- Chevrolet Caprice Current issue patrol car.
- Chevrolet Impala Current issue patrol car.
- Chevrolet Tahoe PPV – Current issue patrol car.
- Ford Crown Victoria Police Interceptor – Mostly phased out as of July 2019. Occasionally seen on a detail, etc.
- Ford F-250 - Prisoner transport vehicle
- Ford Expedition
- Harley-Davidson
- HMMWV

=== Weapons ===
Boston police officers may carry "only weapons, magazines and ammunition authorized and issued by the Department", which "include, but are not limited to":

- Benelli M3 SBS (12 gauge)
- Bushmaster XM-15 (.223 Remington)
- Glock Model 22 (.40 S&W)
- Glock Model 23 (.40 S&W)
- Glock Model 27 (.40 S&W)
- SIG Sauer GSR in .45 ACP
- SIG Sauer P320 9×19mm: used by Boston Police Department Special Operations Unit only.

== Demographics ==
By gender

- Male: 84%
- Female: 16%

By race

- White: 65.5%
- African-American: 23.9%
- Hispanic: 8.3%
- Asian: 2.4%

== Fictional portrayals ==
The Boston Police Department has been portrayed in several prominent motion pictures including The Equalizer, Patriots Day, The Thomas Crown Affair, Gone Baby Gone, Mystic River, The Departed, Edge of Darkness, Blown Away, The Brink's Job, That's My Boy, R.I.P.D., The Heat, X2, What's The Worst That Could Happen?, The Boondock Saints, Spenser Confidential, Surrogates, and The Town. BPD is also featured in the television series City on a Hill, Spenser: For Hire, Rizzoli & Isles, Leverage, Crossing Jordan, Fringe, Boston Blue, and the failed Katee Sackhoff/Goran Visnjic police show pilot Boston's Finest.

== See also ==
- List of law enforcement agencies in Massachusetts
