= Barney McGinniskin =

Irish-born American legislator and police officer (c. 1810–1868)

Bernard "Barney" McGinniskin (c. 1810–1868) was an Irish-born American member of the Great and General Court of Massachusetts and the first Irish-born police officer in the United States.

== Police ==
On November 3, 1851, McGinniskin was appointed to the Boston Police Department. His presence generated considerable controversy. The Boston Pilot wrote, "He is the first Irishman that ever carried the stick of a policeman anywhere in this country, and meetings, even Faneuil Hall meetings, have been held to protect against the appointment." At the time, the police salary of $2.00 a day for the morning and afternoon beat and $1.20 for the night watch was nearly twice as high as the wages of laborers.

City Marshal Francis Tukey resisted mayor John Prescott Bigelow's appointment of McGinniskin, expressing the predominant anti-Irish sentiments in the city by arguing it was done at "the expense of an American." On January 5, 1852, shortly before the newly elected mayor Benjamin Seaver (who had been supported by Tukey) took office, Tukey fired McGinniskin without giving a reason. After criticism in the press, Seaver reinstated McGinniskin, who remained in the police until the 1854 anti-Irish groundswell of the Know Nothing/American Party movement, when in the words of the Boston Pilot, "Mr. McGinniskin was discharged from the Boston Police for no other reason than he was a Catholic and born in Ireland."

== Later life and death ==
McGinniskin became a United States inspector at the customhouse and died of rheumatism on March 2, 1868. McGinniskin is buried in the St. Augustine Cemetery in South Boston.

== Works cited ==
- Puleo, Stephen (2010). A City So Grand. Beacon Press.
