= Boston Police Patrolmen's Association =

Police union in Boston, Massachusetts, US

- Founded: 1965
- Headquarters: 295 Freeport St, Dorchester, MA, 02122
- Location: United States
- Members: 1,500 (2020)
- Key people: Larry Calderone, President
- Publication: Pax Centurion
- Website: bppa.org

The Boston Police Patrolmen’s Association (BPPA) is the largest of the police unions representing police officers in the Boston Police Department. As of 2020, it represents approximately 1,500 officers. The BPPA also respresents Boston Emergency Medical Services personnel.

== History ==
The BPPA was established in 1965, in response to new collective bargaining laws that allowed municipal employees to unionize (Mass. Gen. L. c. 149, §§ 178G-N). As described by the association's attorney, its founding purposes was "to protect the patrolmen against widespread charges of police brutality and to hear civilian complaints."

The union successfully negotiated a contract with the city of Boston in 1968. Despite the repeal that same year of a Massachusetts law which forbade law enforcement unions from affiliating with outside labor organizations, the BPPA did not follow the lead of other Massachusetts police unions and did not pursue affiliation with the AFL–CIO.

=== Opposition to school desegregation ===
In 1975, efforts to integrate Boston schools via busing were complicated when hundreds of Boston police officers called in sick due to a BPPA contract dispute: a phenomenon termed the "blue flu." Officers complained that the busing plan violated the union contract by changing shifts and overtime schedules. The National Guard was ultimately called in to supplement the depleted law enforcement presence. Many individual members of the BPPA were vocally against the busing effort, and the union's newsletter published antibusing material at the time. A 1975 federal report of the United States Commission on Civil Rights found that "The Boston Police Patrolmen's Association seriously undermined its ability to help implement [school desegregation] by publicly opposing court-ordered desegregation."

=== Contract negotiations ===
In 2004, BPPA members were joined in protest by other city labor unions after two years without renegotiation of a BPPA contract. The demonstrations became national news as they interfered with preparations for the 2004 Democratic National Convention at the FleetCenter in Boston.

The BPPA has negotiated multiple bargaining agreements which resulted in large pay raises for Boston police officers. After the expiration of the 2012 union contract, a tense BPPA contract negotiation went to arbitration. The BPPA ultimately negotiated a contract that resulted in a 25% pay raise over 6 years. Four years later, the 2016 contract negotiation also went to arbitration and further increased that pay hike, retroactively approving back-pay for a 29% raise between 2010 and 2016. Other city unions agreed to an average six-year raise of 12% over the same period.

In December 2023, the union and Boston mayor Michelle Wu reached an agreement for a new contract. Yawu Miller of the Bay State Banner described it as being, "the first [contract] in which [Boston] city officials have managed to secure significant reforms from the Patrolmen’s union." Under the terms of the contract, it was agreed that officers would lose the option to use arbitration to appeal firings or other disciplinary measures if they are convicted of certain crimes. The contract also saw the union agree to allow pay details of the department to be made public, and for their to be more strict outlines on when officers are permitted to take medical leave. It was approved unanimously by the Boston City Council on December 13, 2024. In March 2024, a similar contract was reached by Wu with the Boston Police Detectives Benevolent Society.

=== Political advocacy ===
During the 1988 United States presidential election, the BPPA made headlines by endorsing Republican presidential candidate George H. W. Bush instead of the then-governor of Massachusetts, Michael Dukakis.

In recent years, the BPPA has strongly lobbied, and sometimes litigated, state and city lawmakers around various policing-related legislation. In 2016, the BPPA sued to prevent the adoption of body-worn cameras. The BPPA was a vocal critic of state and municipal police reform legislation passed in the aftermath of nationwide protests against racial injustice in summer 2020.

The union is not a member of the Greater Boston Labor Council.

The union made an early endorsement ahead of the 2025 Boston mayoral election, supporting incumbent mayor Michelle Wu for re-election, offering praise for her performance in office in her first term. The union's endorsement of Wu marked the first time in more than 30 years that it had endorsed an incumbent mayor for re-election.

== Controversies ==
=== Pax Centurion newsletter ===
The BPPA's newsletter, Pax Centurion, came under scrutiny in 2012 for publishing material that was "hostile toward racial and religious minorities." The editor, Officer James Carnell, was criticized by many including the Boston police commissioner. Multiple advertisers cancelled their arrangements with the newsletter in response.

=== Black Lives Matter ===
In 2020, BPPA president Michael Leary wrote a letter to the Boston Teachers' Union denouncing programming to promote racial justice in local schools. Leary referred to Black Lives Matter as an "antipolice organization" that "inaccurately demoniz[es] police as racists who kill innocent people." The letter drew criticism from the Teachers' Union, the NAACP, and some local police officers.

=== Patrick Rose child rape scandal ===
In April 2021, an investigation by the Boston Globe revealed that the BPD and BPPA were aware of credible child sexual assault and molestation allegations against BPPA president Patrick Rose as early as 1995. Documents released by the Boston Police Department reveal that, after a brief punitive suspension to administrative duty, Rose was reinstated to full duty in 1997 after the BPPA sent a letter to BPD seeking information to assist them as they "consider[ed] whether to file a grievance" regarding Rose's suspension. Rose then went on to molest five other children during his next 23 years on the force. In April 2022, Rose pleaded guilty to 21 counts of child rape and sexual assault, for which he was sentenced 10–13 years in prison.

=== Thomas Nee conviction ===
In 2021, former president Thomas Nee pleaded guilty to conspiracy to commit theft concerning programs receiving federal funds and embezzlement from an agency receiving federal funds. Nee admitted to submitting false and fraudulent overtime slips from 2015 to 2019 which allowed him to collect $16,642 for overtime hours he did not work. He was the fifteenth current or former BPD officer charged in connection with an investigation into overtime abuse at the department's evidence warehouse.

== List of presidents ==
Since its founding in 1965, the BPPA has had 10 presidents:

1. Richard "Dick" MacEachern (1965-?)
2. Dan Sweeney (?-1972)
3. Chester "Chet" Broderick (1972-?)
4. Robert "Bobby" Guiney
5. Don Murray
6. Richard "Dick" Bradley
7. Thomas "Tom" Nee (1997-2014)
8. Patrick "Pat" Rose (2014-2018)
9. Michael Leary (2018-2020)
10. Lawrence "Larry" Calderone (2020 - present)
