= Massachusetts Convention Center Authority =

Coordinates: 42°20′44.84″N 71°02′45.28″W

- Company type: Independent Public Authority
- Industry: Conventions
- Founded: 1982 in Boston, Massachusetts, United States
- Key people: John Barros, interim Executive Director
- Number of employees: 450 full and part-time employees (2016)
- Website: massconvention.com

The Massachusetts Convention Center Authority (MCCA) owns and oversees the operation of the Boston Convention & Exhibition Center (BCEC), the John B. Hynes Veterans Memorial Convention Center, The Lawn on D, the MassMutual Center in Springfield, Massachusetts, and the Boston Common Garage.

The MCCA controls 30 acres of prime undeveloped land in Boston's South Boston Waterfront.

== MCCA Mission ==
The Massachusetts Convention Center Authority's (MCCA) mission is to generate significant regional economic activity by attracting conventions, tradeshows, and other events to its world-class facilities while maximizing the investment return for the residents and businesses in the Commonwealth of Massachusetts. According to their web site "In 2015, the MCCA hosted 262 events at the BCEC and Hynes with 724,292 attendees, generating 632,433 hotel room nights and $784 million in economic impact."

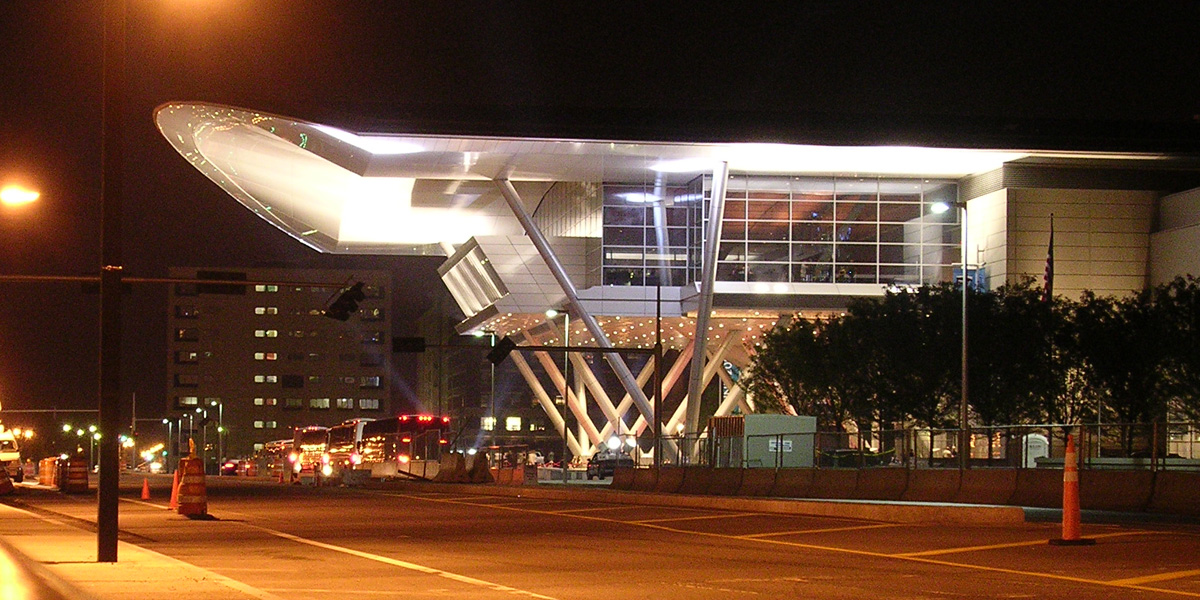
Boston Convention & Exhibition Center

== History ==
In May 2017, the MCCA said they would be issuing a request for proposal to hire a firm to analyze development options on the 30 acres of land surrounding the Boston Convention and Exhibition Center. In February 2018, the MCCA tapped design and consultancy firm Arcadis to oversee capital improvements across four MCCA facilities. <Boston Business Journal Feb 6, 2018></https://www.bizjournals.com/boston/news/2018/02/06/mcca-taps-dutch-firm-arcadis-to-oversee-capital.html>

== Photo gallery ==
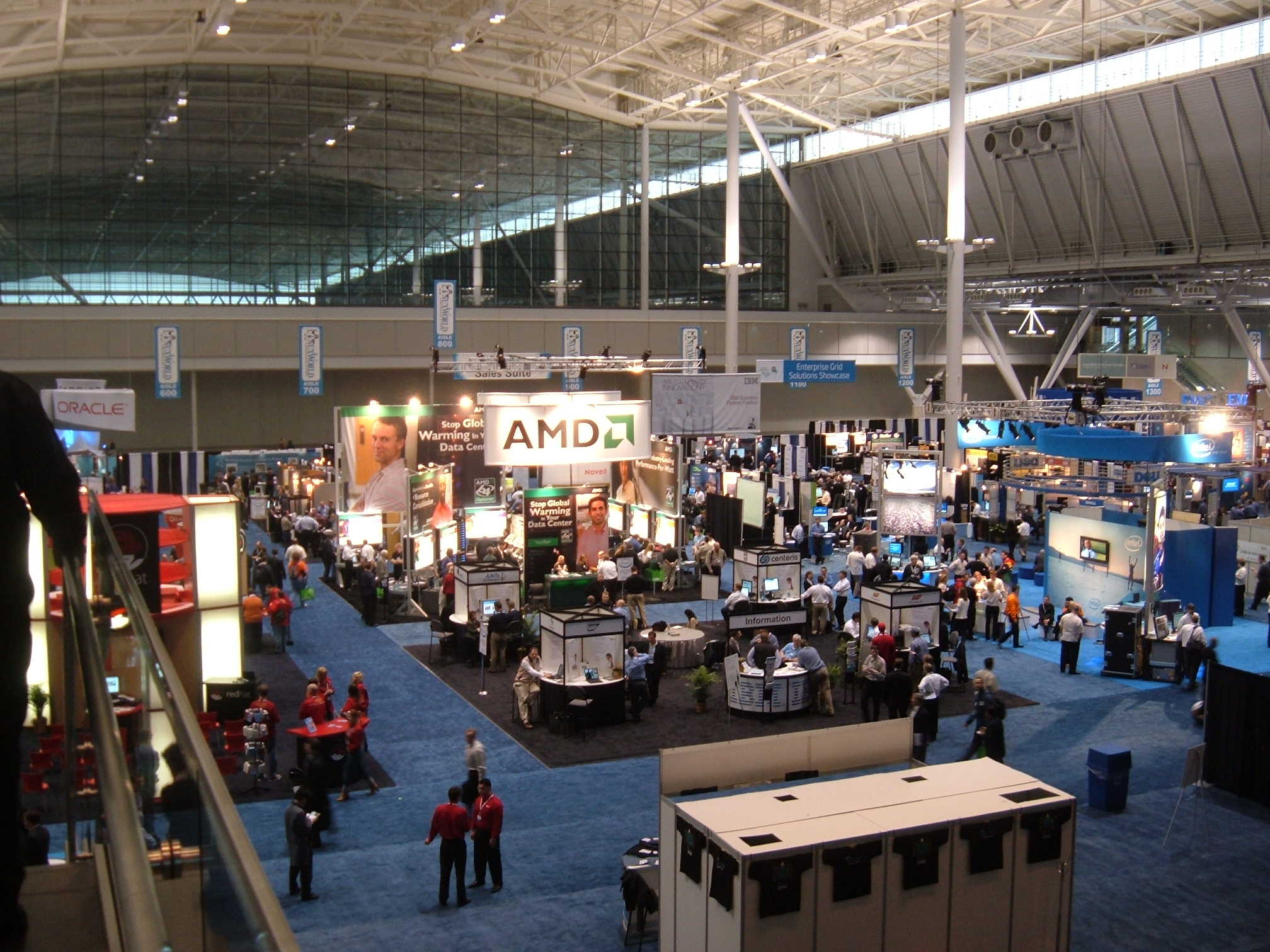
The Linuxworld trade show at the Boston Convention and Exhibition Center

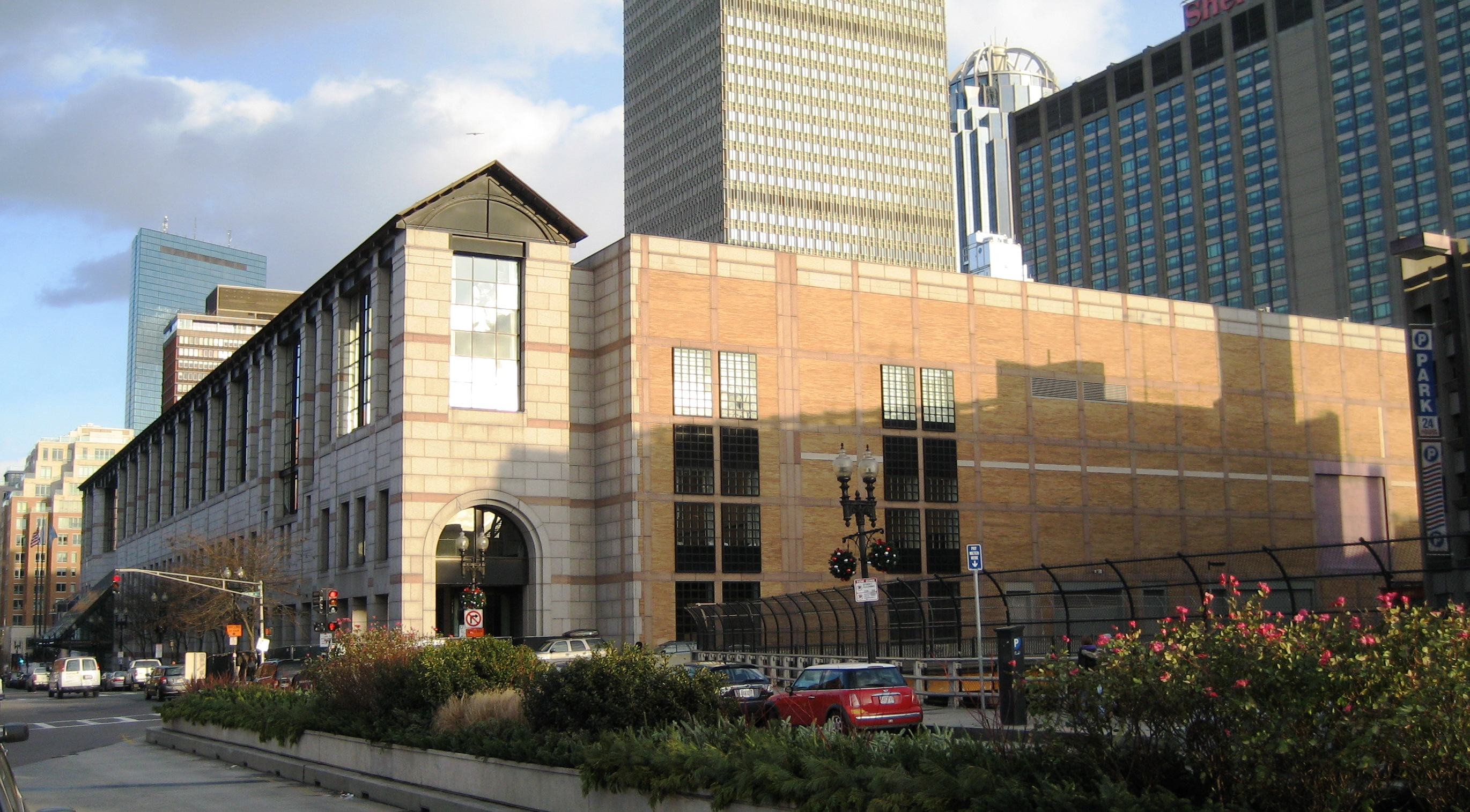
Hynes Convention Center

== Useful links ==
- Massachusetts Convention Center Authority
- MCCA Mobile
- MCCA Events Calendar
- MCCA Lost & Found Items
