= Symbols of Springfield, Massachusetts =

The City of Springfield, Massachusetts has two official symbols, and is also often represented by depictions of the Municipal Group as a de facto emblem of its government.

== City flag ==
Springfield, Massachusetts
- Use: Civil flag
- Adopted: 1923
- Designed by: Charles H. Restall; original statue by Augustus Saint Gaudens

Adopted in 1923, the municipal flag of Springfield is described by the city's code in such terms

The City adopts by this section a City flag in details as follows:

A. Such flag shall have an inner blue field bordered with gold and set in an outer white field.
B. In the center of the blue field, on both the front and reverse thereof, shall be a white shield bordered with gold.
C. Arched above the shield and set in the blue field shall be a scroll in gold bearing the inscription "Springfield."
D. Upon the seal shall be a likeness in gold of the St. Gaudens statue of Deacon Samuel Chapin.
E. Within the shield and below on both sides flanking said likeness shall be a scroll in gold bearing the inscription "A Town May 14, 1636 O.S. Organized A City May 25, 1852," all in substantial conformity with the design executed by Charles H. Restall and filed in the office of the City Clerk.

The Puritan statue in itself could be considered a symbol of Springfield; the flag appears in the former aldermanic chambers to the right of a portrait of the same. The flag is also in the current Council chambers, which once housed the Common Council. Because the city code neglects to mention specific standards for the flag's measurements, several variations of both the statue's rendering, as well as differing proportions for the flag have appeared since its adoption, including a gold border outer border not described in the code which can be seen in the examples below.

=== Variants ===
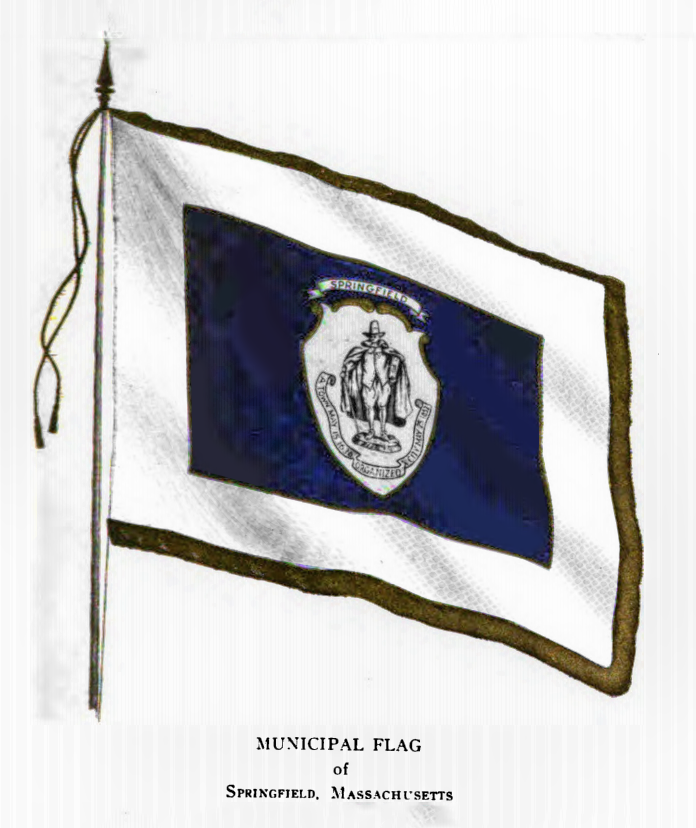
An early example of the flag, printed in a book on Samuel Chapin's genealogy; note the lack of gold shading on the banner and statue, wider white field and golden fringe.

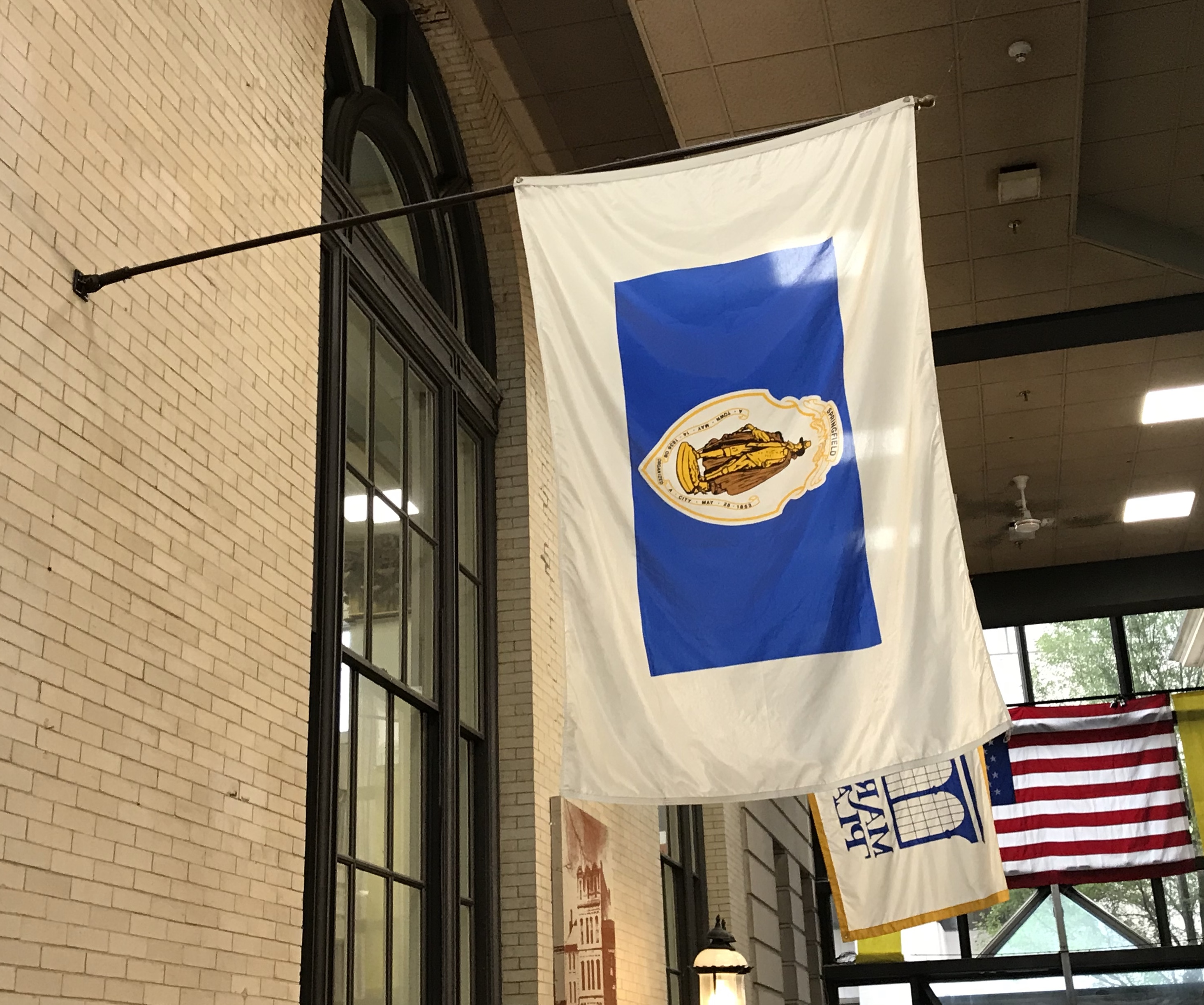
A variant of the flag seen in Metro Center, Springfield; note the absence of gold trim, banner with only gold and white, lighter blue, wider white field, and Puritan facing leftward

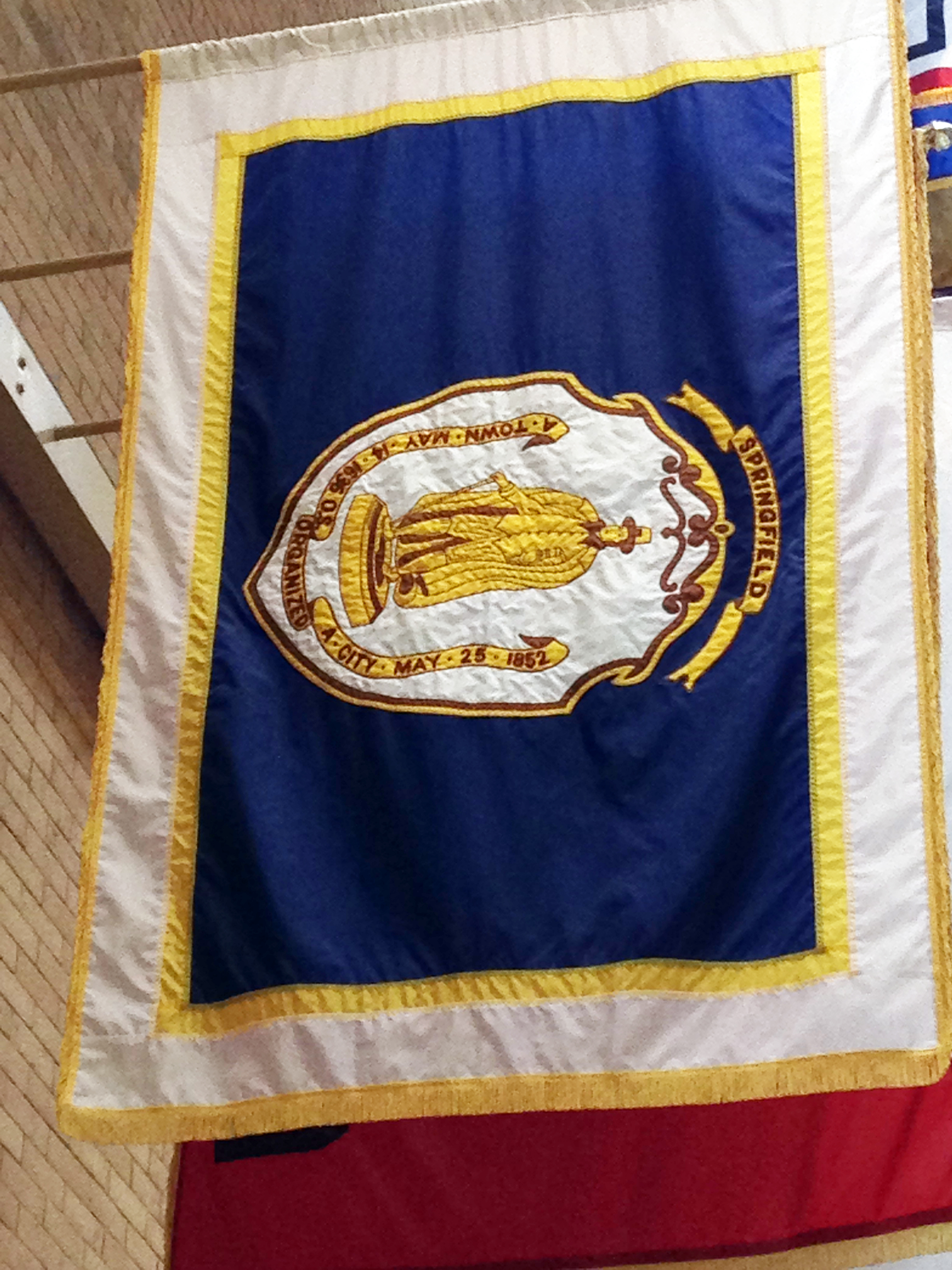
The flag as it appears in the Massachusetts State House Hall of Flags; containing an unusual rendition of The Puritan statue and bearing a different shield and proportions from the previous example.

== City seal ==
Seal of the City of Springfield, Massachusetts

Versions
- The Coat of Arms, as it appears on the campanile of the Springfield Municipal Group, as well as cap badges of the Springfield Police Department
- Armiger: City of Springfield
- Adopted: c. 1871
- Crest: Arsenal building of the Springfield Armory, facing from the opposite side of the tower
- Shield: Clockwise from top: The first Springfield Union Station with a train crossing the first North End Bridge; John Pynchon's estate, the "Old Fort"; a riverside scene of the city on the Connecticut River; a double-ended arrow runs across the center of the shield pointing east and west
- Use: Officiating municipal government documents and signage

The Seal of the City of Springfield was adopted around 1871, under the following ordinance

No. 29. An Ordinance to Establish a City Seal.
1. Description of the seal.

Section 1. The design hereto annexed, as executed by Richard Paine, giving a view of the city, shall be the device of the city seal, the inscription being as follows, to wit : 'Springfield, organized a town May 14, 1636, O. S., a city, May 26, 1852.

Whereas the city ordinance describes a seal produced by engraver Richard Paine, the rendition from which the modern depiction is derived from was carved by engraver Thomas Chubbuck. The seal contains a number of scenes of Springfield's historic buildings. In its crest is a picture of the Springfield Armory's arsenal building with the American flag, the only recognizable landmark of the seal extant today. Below this crest sits a shield with an embellished trim and an arrow running through it from east to west. From the top, clockwise, the first scene shows a train leaving the city's first Union Station, crossing the former North End Bridge over the Connecticut River; the house on the lower right is the "Old Fort", the residence of John Pychon, built on the homestead of his father William Pynchon. Erected in 1660, it was the first brick building in the settlement, and served as a safehouse during the siege on Springfield during King Philip's War, and remained on the corner of what is now Fort Street, presently the Student Prince/Fort Restaurant, until 1831 when it was razed for new construction. The scene on the lower left shows three smaller buildings and two steamboats on river; prior to the construction of Interstate 91, the Connecticut River played a more significant role in the livelihood of the city.

=== Scenes depicted ===
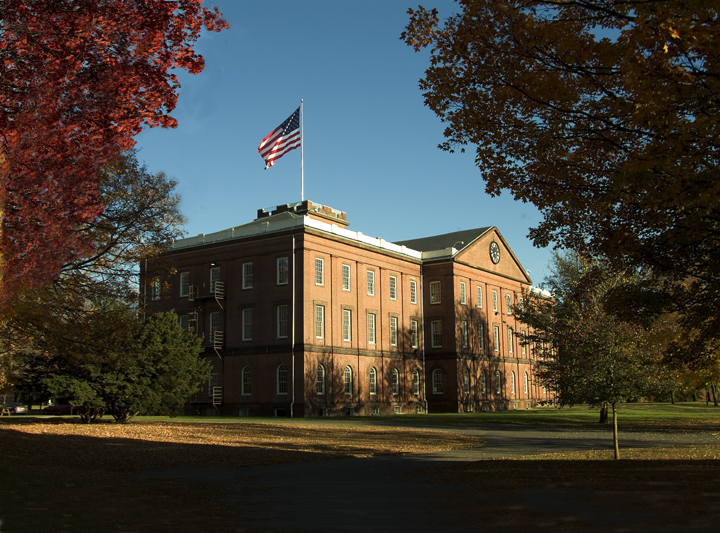
The arsenal building of the Springfield Armory museum and historical site.

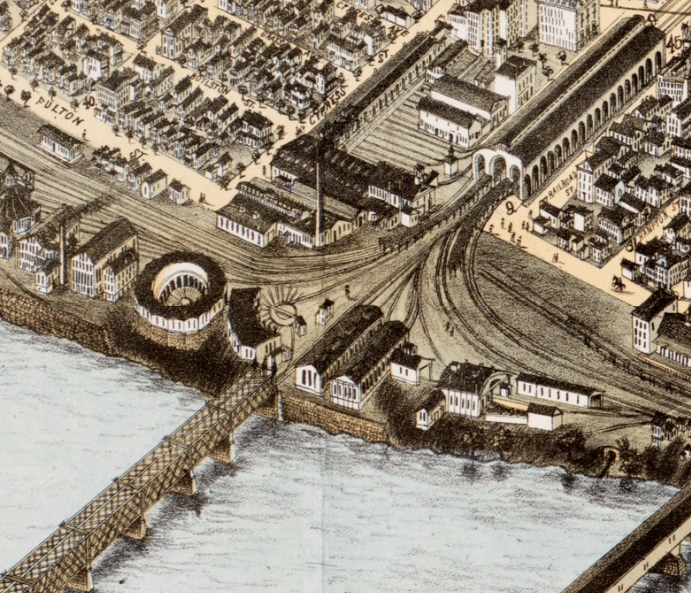
The former North End Bridge and the old Union Station, both of which appear on the upper half of the seal shield.

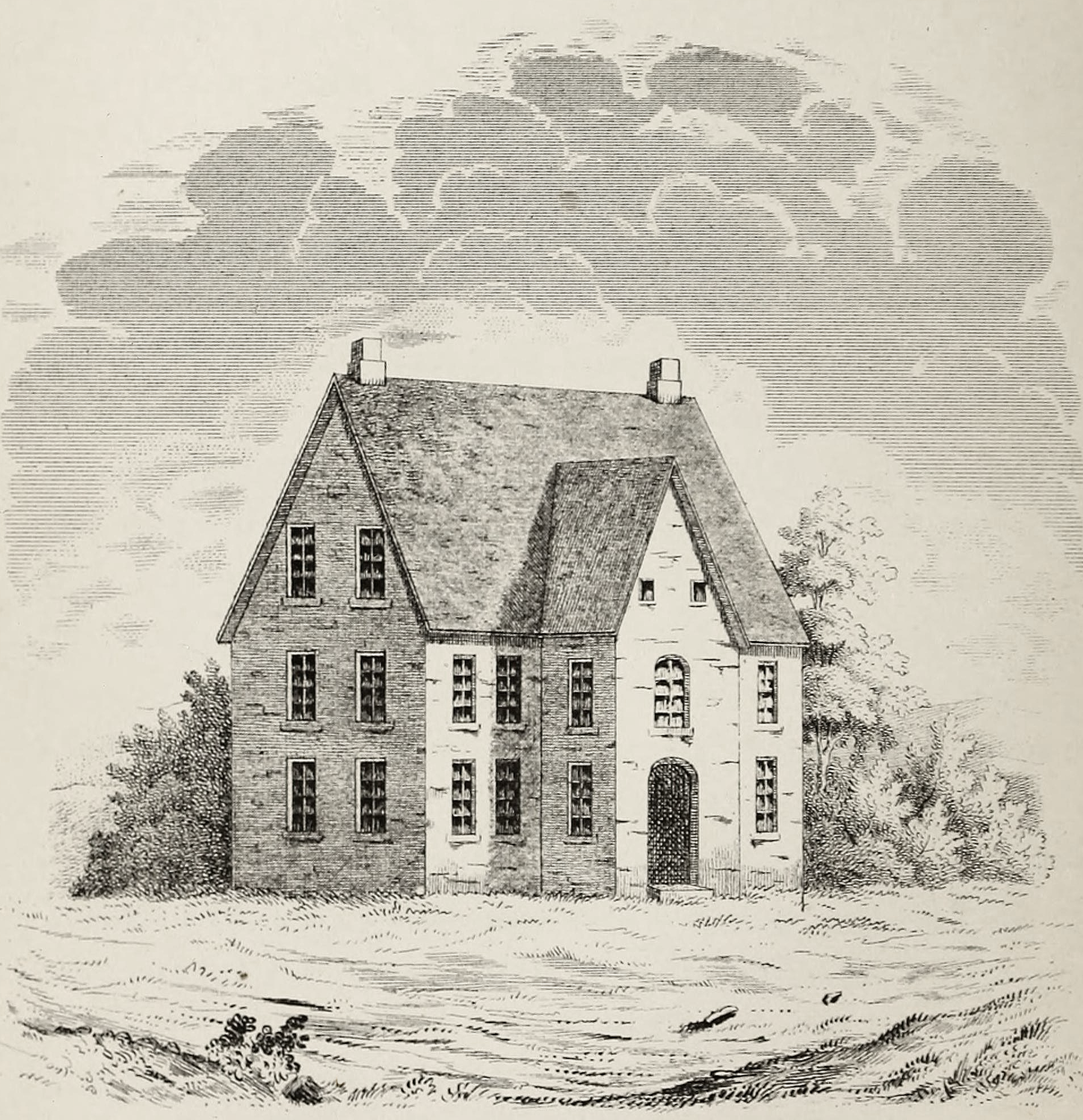
The John Pynchon homestead, also known as the "Old Fort", drawn by Rev'd William Bourne Oliver Peabody.

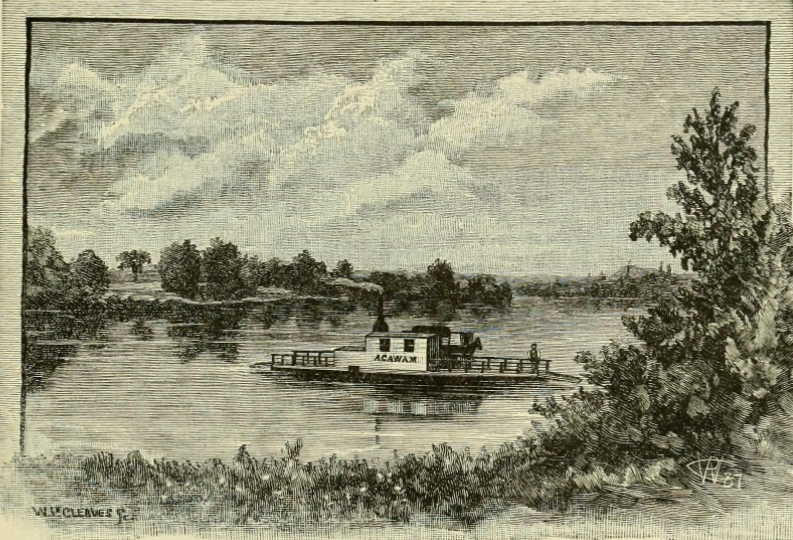
The ferry Agawam", crossing the Connecticut River to Springfield.

=== Variants ===
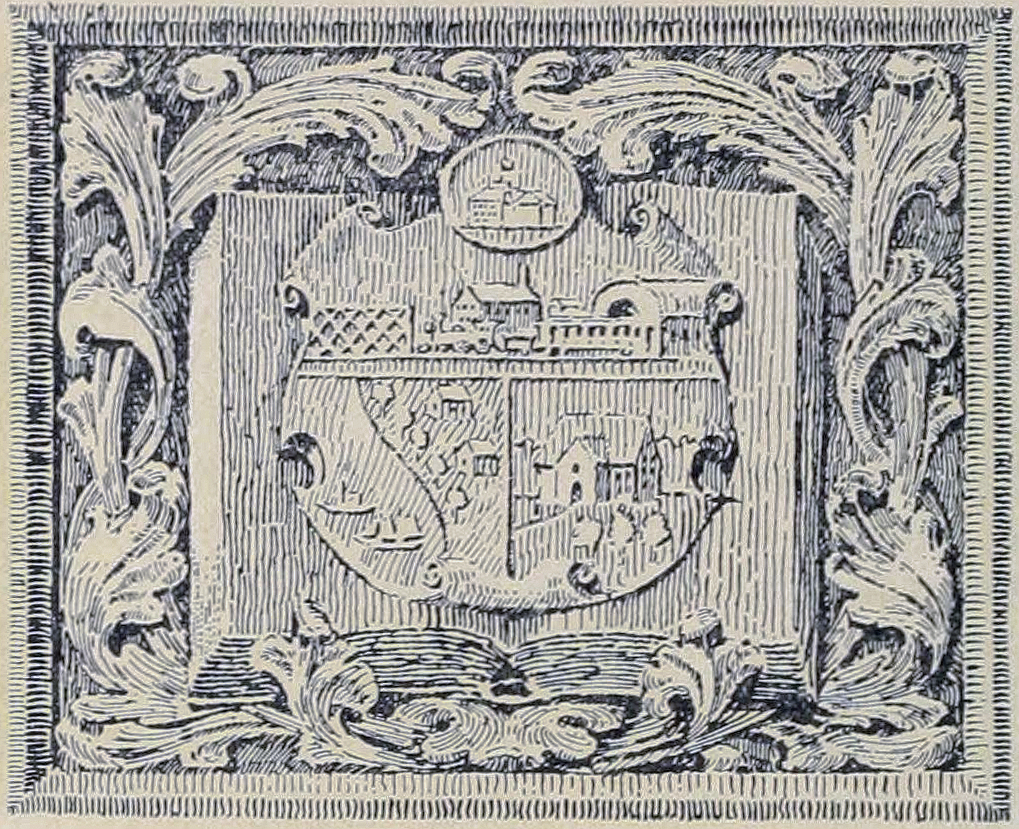
An unofficial example of the coat of arms of the seal, printed in an early 20th-century Springfield history book.

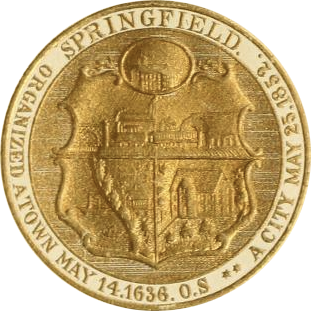
The seal, as it appeared in the city's official 250th anniversary history

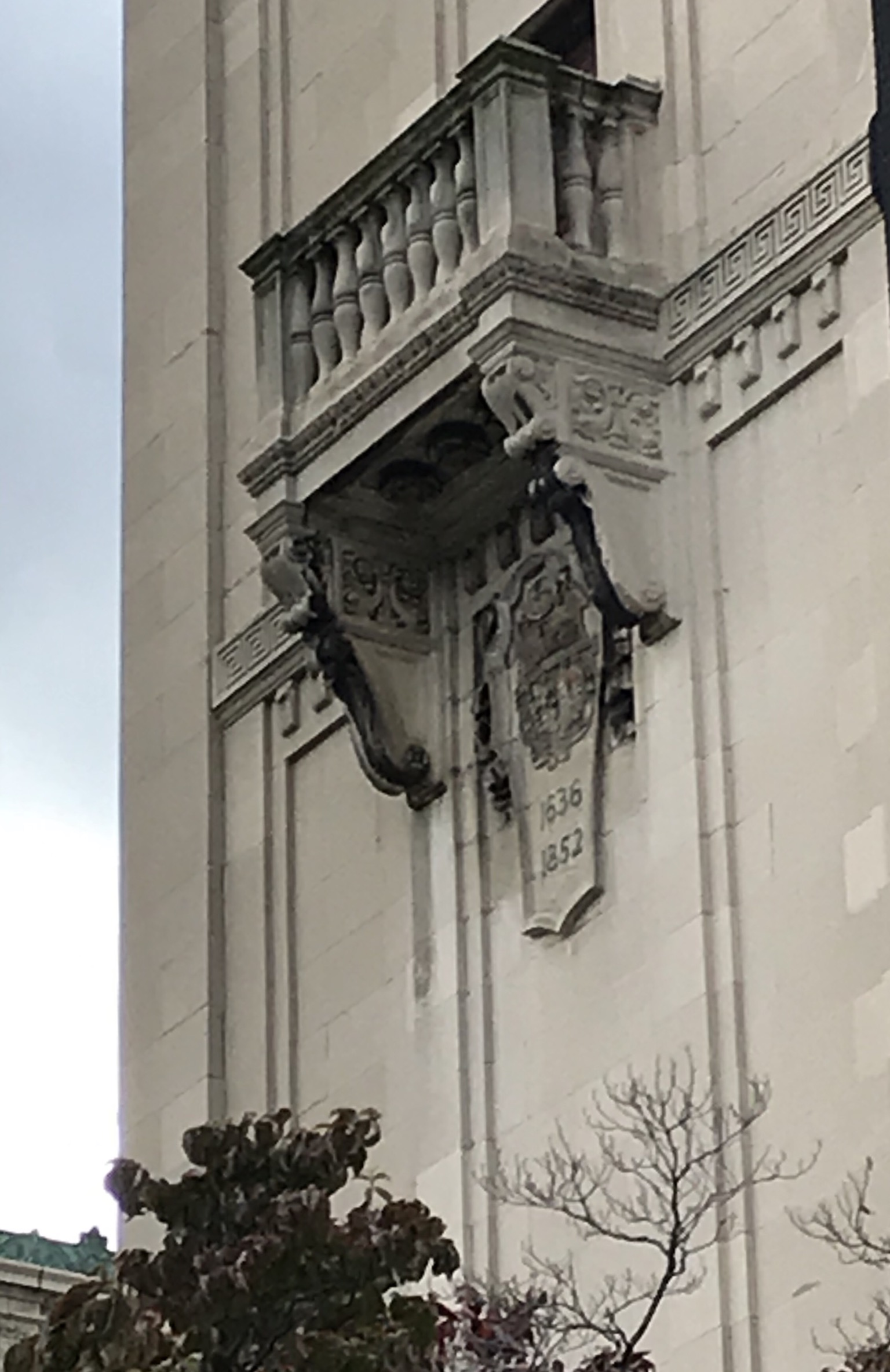
The Coat of Arms, below a balcony of the Campanile

== City emblem ==
An example of an emblem of the Springfield Municipal Group, as seen in a 1944 city report

Often used in the city's press releases, civil patches, and official letterhead, is the Springfield Municipal Group— the group of Neoclassical buildings comprising, from left to right, Symphony Hall, the campanile, and City Hall. In addition to its clerical use the symbol is also used by the mayor, who can often be seen wearing a Municipal Group lapel pin in tandem with one of the American flag.

=== Usages ===
Patch of the Springfield Police Department.

Patch of the Springfield Fire Department.

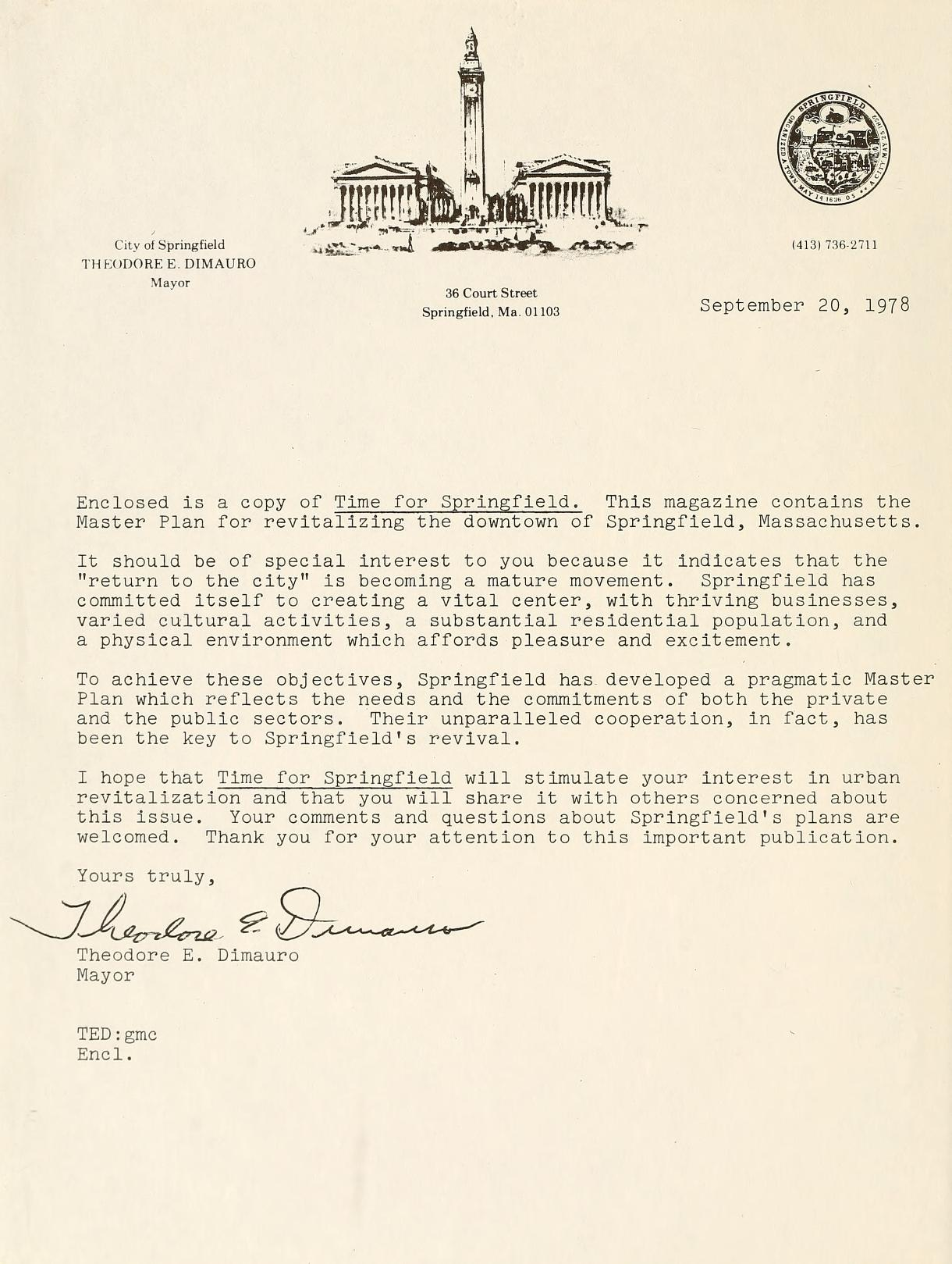
Official letterhead of the city in a letter from former Mayor Theodore Dimauro.
