= Thomas Chubbuck =

American engraver (1820–1888)

- Born: February 22, 1820; Boston, Massachusetts, US
- Died: January 10, 1888 (aged 67); Springfield, Massachusetts, US
- Known for: Designer of "Brattleboro stamp", one of the first American gummed stamps; engraver of the Seal of Springfield, Massachusetts
- Political party: Prohibition Party
- Spouse: Sylvia Turner Hobart (m. 1842)

Thomas Chubbuck (February 22, 1820 – January 10, 1888) was an American copper and steel engraver best known for designing of one of the earliest American gummed stamps, the "Brattleboro stamp", in 1846, as well as the engraver of the modern seal of Springfield, Massachusetts.

While living in Boston, apprenticing as an engraver by profession and studying music as an amateur, Chubbuck met Frederick N. Palmer, then a music teacher and later postmaster of the Brattleboro, Vermont post office. After the two relocated to Brattleboro, Palmer asked Chubbuck to design a simple stamp for pre-paid postage in August 1846, Chubbuck obliged, "for the fun of the thing".

Though a rarity, the Brattleboro stamp has been falsely described as the first postage stamp in the United States, Chubbuck modeled it after its preceding counterparts from Providence and the New York Postmaster's Provisional.

By the end of Chubbuck's life examples of such stamps were sold by collectors for as much as $200 (approximately $5761.51 in 2019 USD), and were sold for as much as $16,500 at auction in 2015. Chubbuck was also a prominent figure in Springfield's temperance community, paying for the fees and charter of the Western Massachusetts Sons of Temperance chapter in his final years leading up to his death.

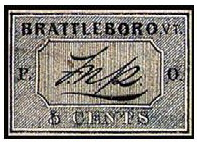
Chubbuck's design for the "Brattleboro stamp", with Frederick N. Palmer's initials
