= Massachusetts State Police =

Law enforcement agency

- Patch of Massachusetts State Police

- Massachusetts State Police seal

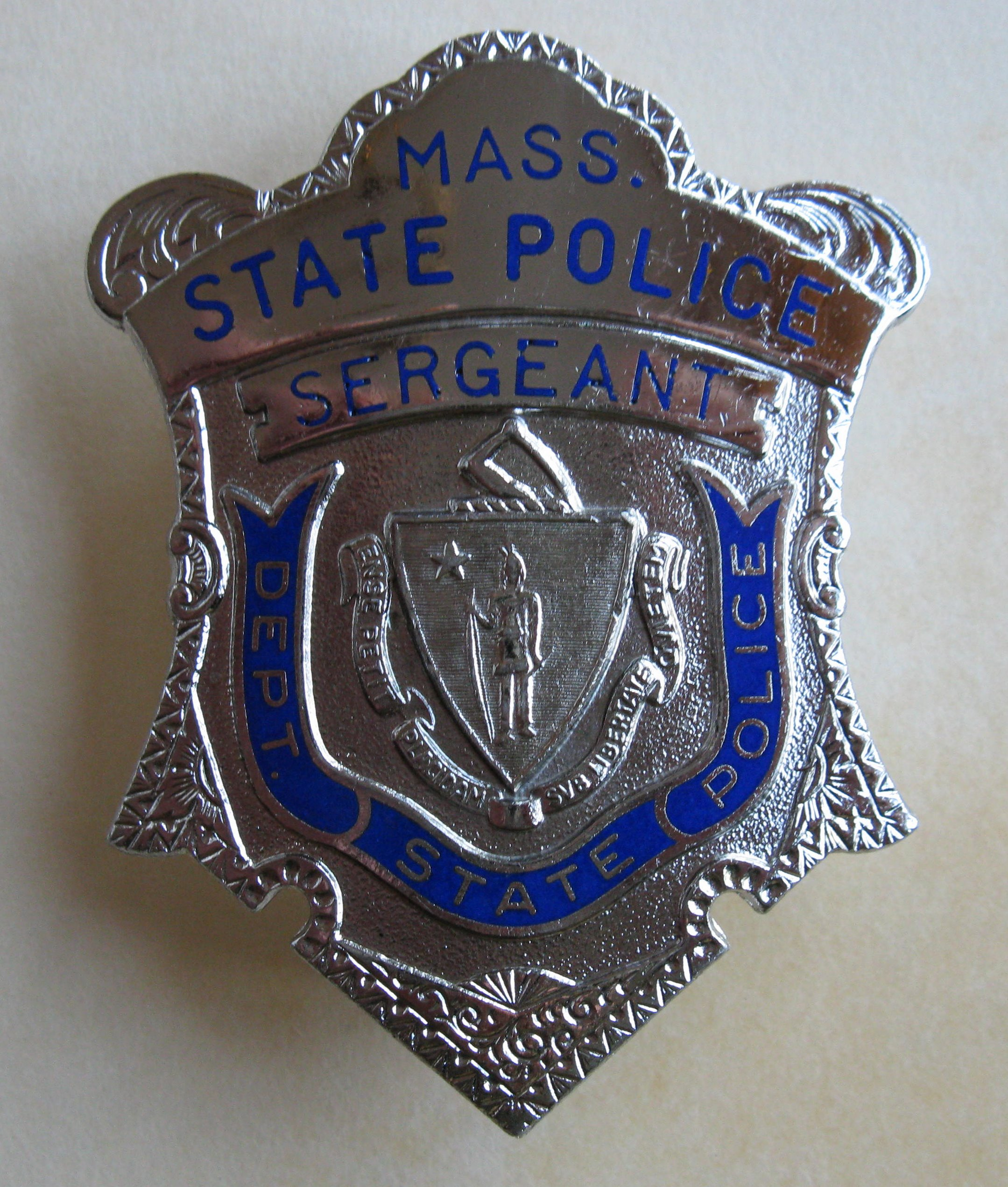
- Badge of Massachusetts State Police
- Abbreviation: MSP

Agency overview
- Formed: May 16, 1865; 161 years ago
- Employees: 2,678 (as of Oct. 4, 2022)

Jurisdictional structure
- Operations jurisdiction: Massachusetts, USA
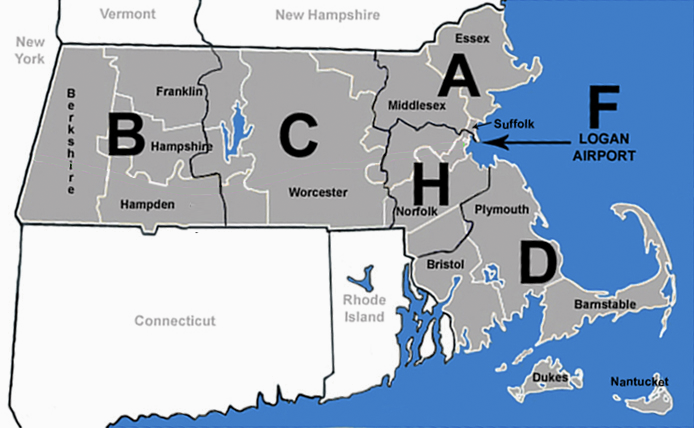
- Massachusetts State Police Troop Map
- Area: 10,565 square miles (27,360 km^{2})
- Population: 6,922,107 (2022 est.)
- Legal jurisdiction: Commonwealth of Massachusetts
- Governing body: Commonwealth of Massachusetts
- General nature: Civilian police

Operational structure
- Headquarters: Framingham, Massachusetts
- Troopers: 2,500 (as of July. 23rd, 2025)
- Civilian employees: 611 (as of Oct. 4, 2022)
- Agency executives: Colonel Geoffrey Noble, Superintendent; Lieutenant Colonel John E. Mawn Jr., Deputy Superintendent; Lieutenant Colonel James Concannon, Field Services Division Commander; Lieutenant Colonel John Pinkham, Standards & Training Division Commander; Michelle Small, Chief Administrative Officer
- Parent agency: Executive Office of Public Safety and Security

Facilities
- Barracks: 39
- Patrol Vehicles: Ford Explorer, Chevrolet Tahoe
- Aviation Units: Eurocopter AS355

Website
- mass.gov/msp

The Massachusetts State Police (MSP) is an agency of the Commonwealth of Massachusetts' Executive Office of Public Safety and Security, responsible for law enforcement and vehicle regulation across the state. The MSP is known in the common local vernacular as The Staties, whose officers are referred to as Staties. As of 2024, it has 2,500 sworn troopers and 611 civilian support staff for a total of 3,111 personnel, making it the largest law enforcement agency in New England. The MSP is headed by Colonel Geoffrey Noble, the first colonel not to come from State Police ranks.

== History ==
The MSP was established by Massachusetts state governor John A. Andrew when he signed a law creating the State Constabulary on May 16, 1865. This legislative act to "establish a State Police Force" founded the first statewide enforcement agency in the nation. The first leader of the State Police was William Sterling King, an American officer in the Union Army during the American Civil War. The agency remained small and rather informal until 1921, when the MSP was enlarged to comprise 50 officers stationed in barracks across the state with the primary mission of providing law enforcement to rural areas underserved by existing local police agencies. This law enforcement mission was performed by the trooper on horseback, usually, and in motor cars in areas with upgraded roads. The MSP enlarged its mission to handle primary vehicular regulation on the Commonwealth's interstate and limited-access highways after their development mid-century; during this period, it also established a presence in protecting Logan International Airport.

For much of the 20th century, the MSP was organized along military lines with a heavy emphasis on the role of the barracks, spartan working conditions, and a uniformity in appearance and internal culture. Until recently, the MSP maintained one of the strictest regimens for physical size requirements for applicants. Efforts are being made presently to render the department more racially diverse, as well as more inclusive of women and LGBT troopers.

Since its inception, 48 officers from the Massachusetts State Police and its former agencies that made up its ranks have been killed in the line of duty. The earliest known death was in 1909 and the latest death was May 6, 2026.

In November 2019, Superintendent Gilpin announced her retirement as colonel of the Massachusetts State police after two years in the position.

=== Firearms ===
During the 1960s and 1970s, the MSP issued the Walther PPK as a special assignment weapon.

During the 1980s, the .357 Magnum Smith & Wesson Model 65 was issued to the troopers. Different weapons were issued for off-duty and special assignments. Prior to 1986, they were issued two Smith & Wesson Model 65 revolvers, one with a 4-inch barrel for on-duty wear, and one with a 3-inch barrel for off-duty wear; they were required to wear a 3-inch-barreled revolver even if they were at the beach in a bathing suit. They were required at the time to carry two weapons at all times, because they were considered on duty 24/7. From 1986 and on, the new off-duty weapon was the .38 Special Smith & Wesson Bodyguard revolver.

The agency issued the SIG Sauer P226 in 9mm from the early 1990s, followed by the SIG Sauer P226 DAK (Double Action Kellerman) in .40 S&W.

In 2011, troopers started carrying the Smith & Wesson M&P pistol in .45 ACP.

As of 2023, the MSP is replacing the .45 ACP handguns with the SIG Sauer P320 chambered in 9mm. The P320 comes equipped with a Romeo1 red-dot optic and a Night Stick 550XL flashlight attached. The P320 is also set on the X-Series frame.

=== Museum ===
The history of the agency is preserved at the Massachusetts State Police Museum and Learning Center in Whitinsville. The museum was made possible by private donations from MSP troopers and employees. The museum, originally intended to be located at the site of the former Troop C2 barracks, was relocated to a building in Whitinsville after a fire damaged a portion of the old barracks building in 2017. Exhibits at the museum include:

- Restored 1931, 1941, 1951, 1978 Ford cruisers
- Motorcycles, including a 1951 Indian
- State Police weapons (past & present)
- Historical uniforms, hats and artifacts
- Harvard riot photos and riot equipment
- Mounted police equipment and other equine related items
- Original teletype machine
- The first computer and Mobile Data Terminals used by the MSP
- Historic daily station logs
- President John F. Kennedy photos and memorabilia
- Nostalgic badges and patches

== Consolidation of state-controlled police agencies ==
In 1992, the former Massachusetts Department of Public Safety – Division of State Police, Massachusetts Registry of Motor Vehicles Police, Massachusetts Capitol Police, and Metropolitan District Commission (MDC) Police (commonly known as the Metropolitan Police) departments merged to form what is currently known as the Department of State Police (an agency within the Executive Office of Public Safety, which is different from the Department of Public Safety). The four former agencies officially ceased to exist on July 1, 1992. The distinctive uniform and seal of the former Division of State Police would be retained by the newly formed Department of State Police. The ranks of corporal and staff sergeant were not carried over into the new agency. The Massachusetts Environmental Police remained a separate entity under the Department of Fisheries, Wildlife, and Environmental Law Enforcement, and later became a separate department-level office under the re-organised Executive Office of Energy and Environmental Affairs. In the early part of the 2000s the MBTA Police discussed a possible merger but it will most likely not happen due to high costs and standards for both recruitment and training.

== Rank structure ==
The Massachusetts State Police rank structure is as listed:

Rank	Insignia
Colonel	
Lieutenant Colonel	
Major	
Detective Captain	
Captain	
Detective Lieutenant	
Lieutenant	
Sergeant	
Trooper First Class	No insignia
Trooper	No insignia
Probationary Trooper	No insignia
State Police Trainee	No insignia

Promotion to the ranks of Sergeant, Lieutenant, and Captain is based on varying combinations of years of service, promotional exam score, and/or performance on oral examination boards. The ranks of Detective Lieutenant and Detective Captain are appointed; an individual must already have attained the rank of Lieutenant prior to being appointed to the rank of Detective Lieutenant and must have attained the rank of Captain prior to being appointed to the rank of Detective Captain.

The ranks of Major and Lieutenant Colonel are appointed by the Colonel/Superintendent. The Deputy Superintendent holds the rank of Lieutenant Colonel. The Colonel/Superintendent is appointed by the Governor of the Commonwealth of Massachusetts

== Organization ==
- Office of the Superintendent of the State Police
  - Division of Field Services
  - Division of Investigative Services
  - Division of Administrative Services
  - Division of Standards & Training
  - Division of Homeland Security & Preparedness

== Division of Field Services ==
=== State Police stations ===
==== Troop A ====
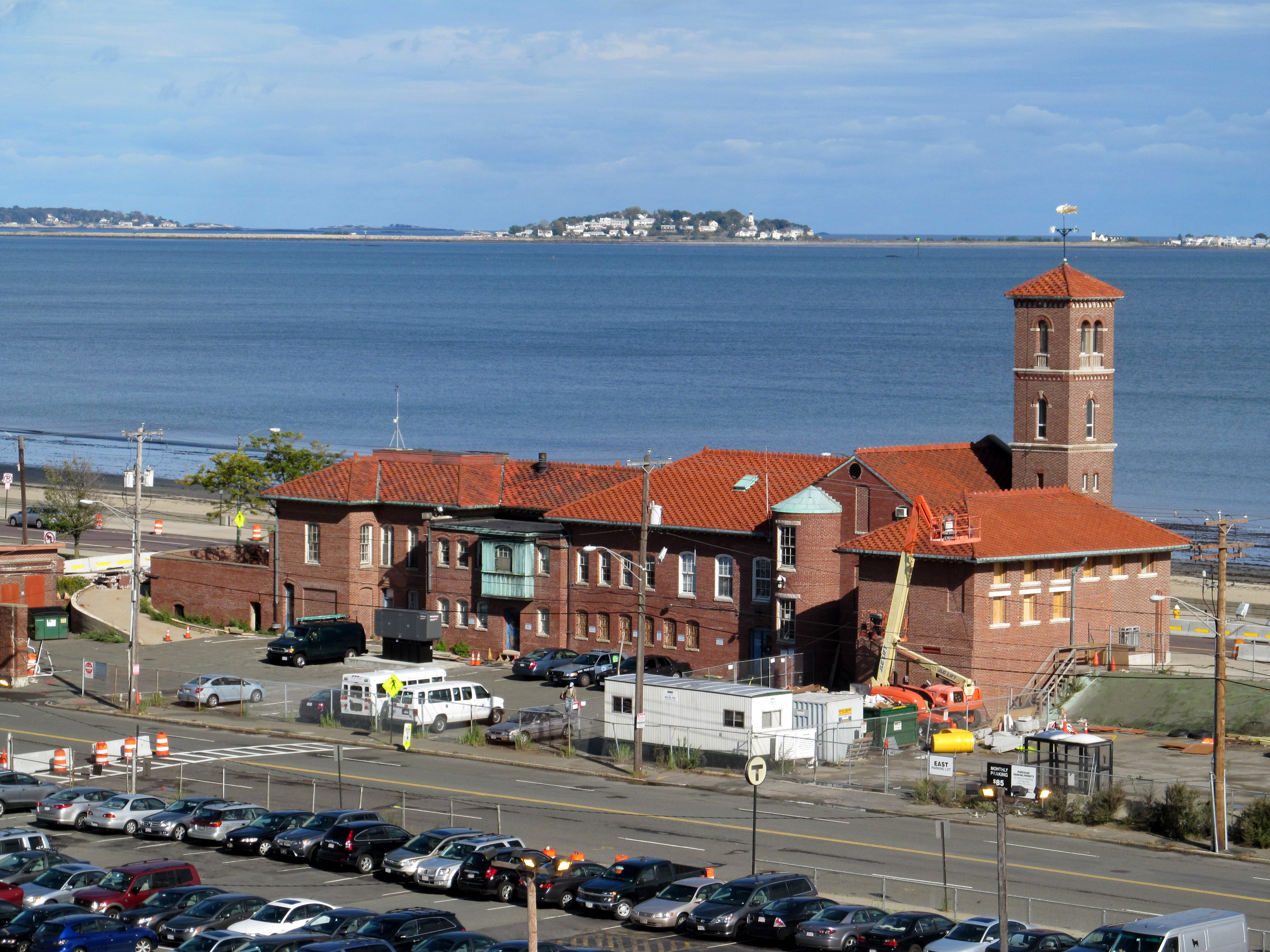
The A-5 Barracks in Revere

Troop "A" includes the northeastern section of the Commonwealth. The A Troop headquarters are located in Danvers, and there are 70 municipalities located within Troop A.

Troop A Barracks are located in:

- A–1 Andover
- A–2 Newbury
- A–3 Concord
- A–4 Medford
- A–5 Revere
- A–6 Danvers

==== Troop B ====
Troop "B" includes the western section of the Commonwealth. The B Troop headquarters are in Northampton. Troop B has primary law enforcement responsibilities in many municipalities that lack local police departments in Western Massachusetts.

Troop B Barracks are located in:

- B–1 Lee
- B–2 Shelburne Falls
- B–3 Springfield
- B–4 Cheshire
- B–5 Russell
- B–6 Northampton
- B–8 Westfield

==== Troop C ====
Troop "C" includes the central section of the Commonwealth. It is the largest of the troops, and the C Troop headquarters are located in Holden. 85 towns rely on C Troop to assist with law enforcement or provide primary patrol coverage. Troop C Barracks C8, located in New Braintree, has no operational Troopers, but is the New Braintree Emergency Dispatch Center, which is the PSAP (Public Safety Access Point) for police, fire and emergency medical services for the towns of New Braintree, Hardwick, Petersham, West Brookfield, North Brookfield, Brookfield, East Brookfield, Brimfield, Holland and Wales. It is co-located with the State Police Academy.

Troop C Barracks are located in:

- C–1 Athol
- C–2 Millbury
- C–3 Brookfield
- C–4 Leominster
- C–5 Sturbridge
- C–6 Holden
- C–7 Belchertown
- C-8 New Braintree
- C–9 Devens
- C–10 Charlton

==== Troop D ====
Troop "D" includes the southeastern section of the Commonwealth. The D Troop headquarters are located in Middleborough, and the Troop also includes Cape Cod, Martha's Vineyard, and Nantucket.

Troop D Barracks are located in:

- D–1 Norwell
- D–2 South Yarmouth
- D–3 North Dartmouth
- D–4 Middleborough
- D–5 Oak Bluffs
- D–6 Nantucket
- D–7 Bourne

==== Troop F ====
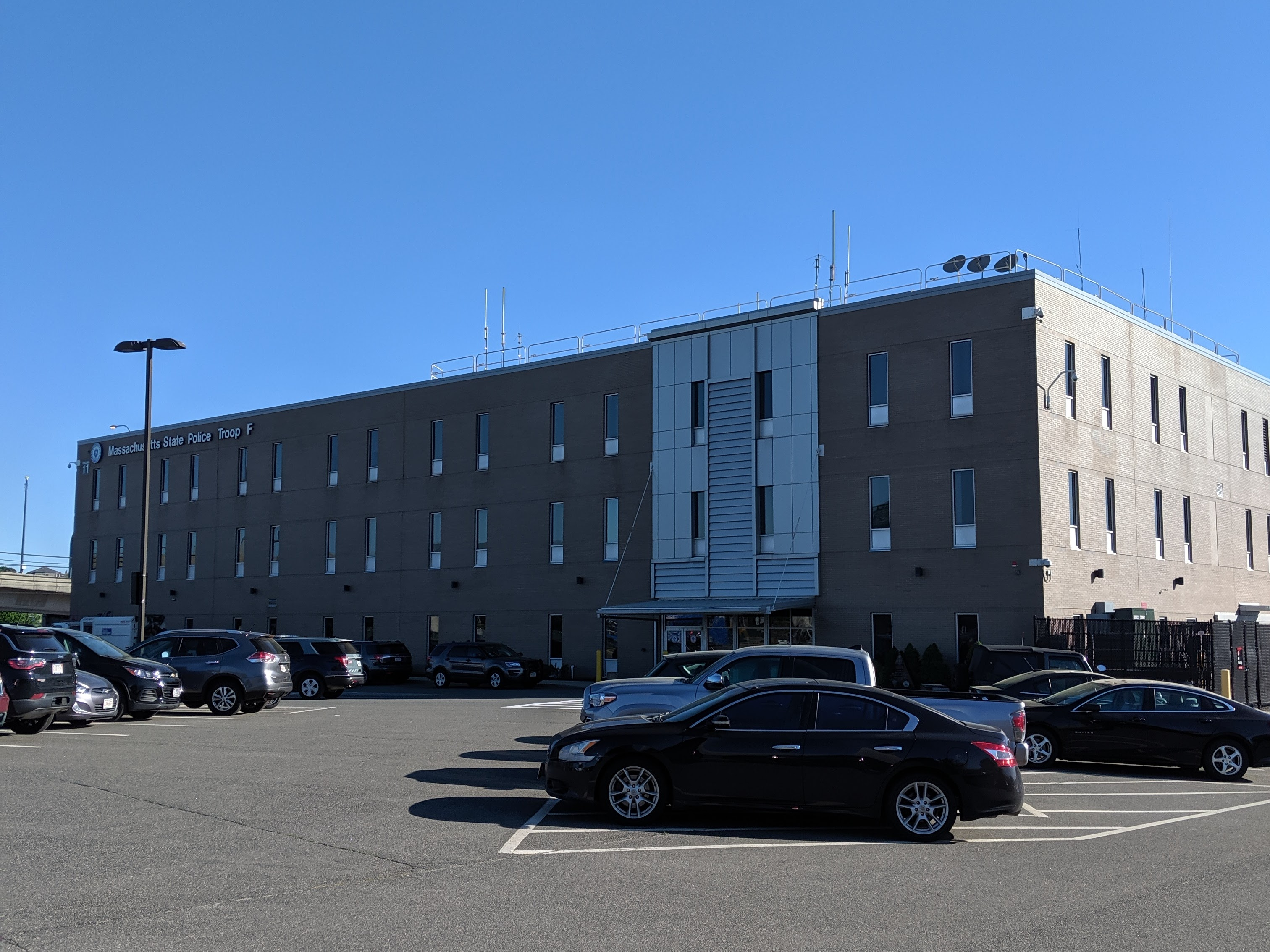
Troop F barracks at Boston Logan International Airport.

Troop F patrols and provides law enforcement for all properties of the Massachusetts Port Authority, including Boston's Logan International Airport in East Boston, Boston's seaport district, the Port of Boston, the Worcester Regional Airport, Hanscom Field and South Boston's World Trade Center. Until 2010, its only barracks was located within the airport. It moved to a building on the outskirts, allowing for more space, parking, and better access to the property.

The Troop F Commander also serves as Massport's Director of Aviation Security.

Troop F Barracks is located in:

- F–1 Logan International Airport

==== Troop H ====
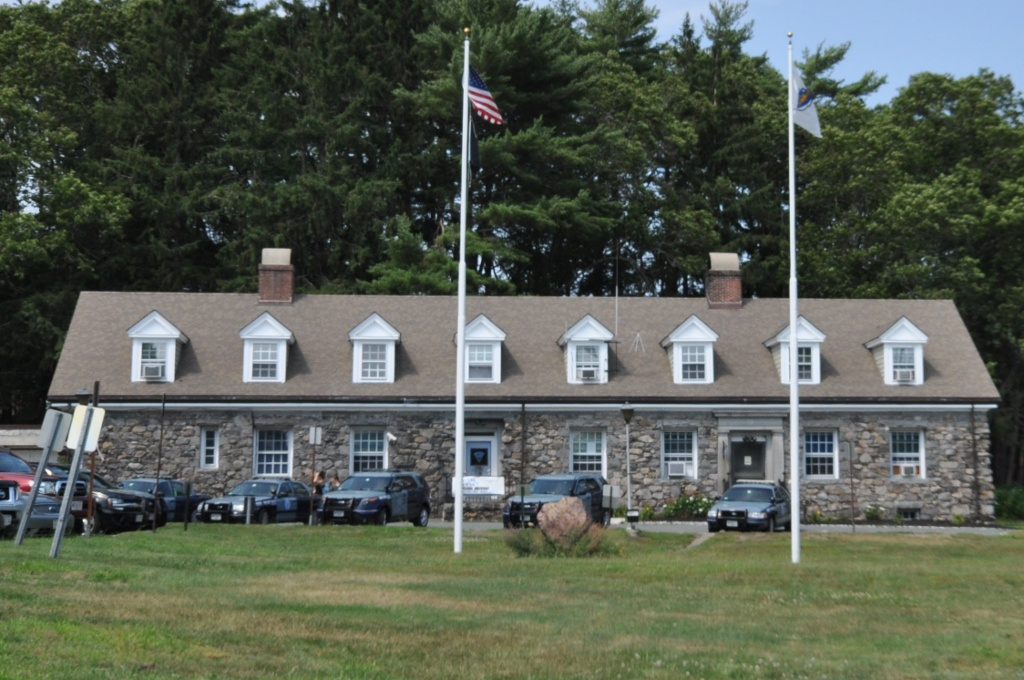
The H-7 Barracks in Milton

Troop "H" includes all of Boston and the metropolitan Boston area south, west, and northwest of Boston not covered by A-4 and A-5. This troop extends southwest to the Rhode Island border and west to the A Troop border in Waltham, and north to Somerville. Troop H headquarters are located in South Boston.

Troop H Barracks are located in:

- H–1 Government Center (In the McCormack Building, 1 Ashburton Place)
- H–2 Framingham (Co-located with department headquarters)
- H–3 Foxborough
- H–4 Boston
- H–6 South Boston
- H–7 Milton
- H–8 Weston
- H–9 Tunnels

==== Community Action Teams ====
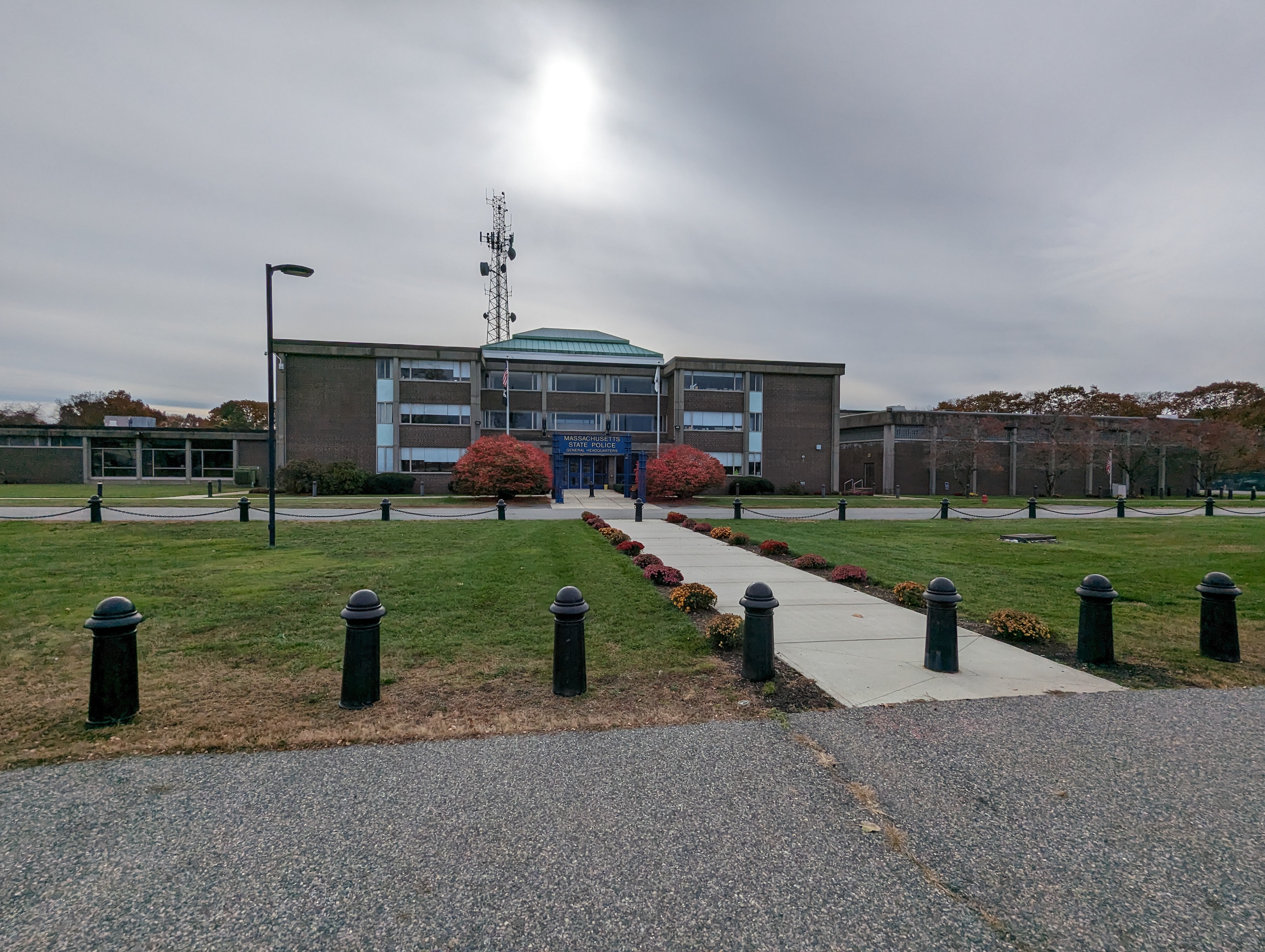
The Massachusetts State Police General Headquarters in Framingham, Massachusetts

The State Police Community Action Team is a unique unit. The purpose of the CAT is to augment A, B, C, D, and H troop barracks with extra patrols to be used for various duties. They are a combination of an anti-crime unit and a motor vehicle enforcement unit, with a very large amount of freedom. The units are part of each troop barracks, out of A, B, C, D and H troop headquarters. The units do not take any mandatory calls, but rather respond to calls using discretion. Duties include routine patrol of high-crime areas in inner cities, routine patrol of major highways, major traffic enforcement, routine plain-clothes foot or vehicle patrol, bicycle patrol, undercover missions with local police departments, and major traffic accident response. CAT troopers are also responsible for dignitary escorts, funeral prisoner escorts, attending community meetings, business seizures, school programs, static vehicle displays at community events, security at high-risk trials, security at parades, and many other various special missions. Also, during winter storms when roads are hazardous, CAT troopers perform normal barracks patrols in order to assist various troop barracks.

=== Special Projects Team ===
The Special Projects Team (SPT) utilizes counter-insurgency (COIN) methodology to detect, disrupt, degrade and dismantle gang activity in Springfield. The team is utilizing a method termed "Counter Criminal Continuum Policing" or C3 Policing. It is composed of a lieutenant and six troopers.

=== Traffic Operations ===
==== Collision Analysis and Reconstruction Section (C.A.R.S.) ====
This section provides reconstruction services to local and state police agencies for collisions involving fatalities or serious bodily injuries. Collision reconstruction specialists are available 24 hours a day, 365 days a year with no charge to the requesting agency. The section responds to calls for assistance in the investigation of fatal or serious bodily injury collisions. C.A.R.S. conducts "at scene" investigations, measuring the scene using the Topcon Total Station, photogrammetry, or graduated tapes. The collision vehicles are examined for mechanical defects and the damage is documented. Data stored by the Event Data Recorder (EDR) is secured and analyzed, as each member is a Crash Data Retrieval (CDR) Technician and Analyst. Mathematical analysis of the data is performed when necessary. Scale diagrams and plates are produced as required, and a detailed reconstruction report is written. Expert testimony is provided by members in both civil and criminal actions. The section also provides detailed, scale mapping of large outdoor crime scenes, and assists agencies with routine mathematical analysis or vehicle examinations. The section is composed of seven sergeants and seventeen troopers, all of whom are active collision reconstructionists. The members of the section are accredited by the Accreditation Commission for Traffic Accident Reconstruction (ACTAR), or are currently pursuing accreditation. The members also maintain memberships in many professional associations, such as the National Association of Professional Accident Reconstruction Specialists (NAPARS). The members, on average, handle approximately 30 cases each per year. They are further required to attain at least 40 hours of additional education/training per year.

==== Motor Vehicle Regulatory Section ====
- Commercial Drivers Licensing Unit - This unit is the primary licensing authority for commercial driver licenses in the Commonwealth.
- Compliance Unit - This unit is responsible for a variety of law enforcement duties focusing on investigations of license fraud and identity theft.
- Salvage Title Unit - This unit conducts salvage inspections and assigns Mass Vehicle Identification Numbers.
- Special Assignment Unit - This unit provides a law enforcement presence at the registry of motor vehicles.
- Vehicle Services Unit - This unit is very diverse. Its duties and responsibilities include school bus inspections and investigations on commercial establishments.

==== Commercial Vehicle Enforcement Section (C.V.E.S.) ====
Also called the "Truck Team," this unit has many duties and responsibilities. These duties include roadside inspection of commercial vehicles, ensuring the safety of hazardous substances in transport, operating weigh stations, local commercial vehicle enforcement, investigating commercial vehicle crashes, investigations, and operating the regional commercial vehicle academy.

=== Tactical Operations ===
==== Air Wing Section ====
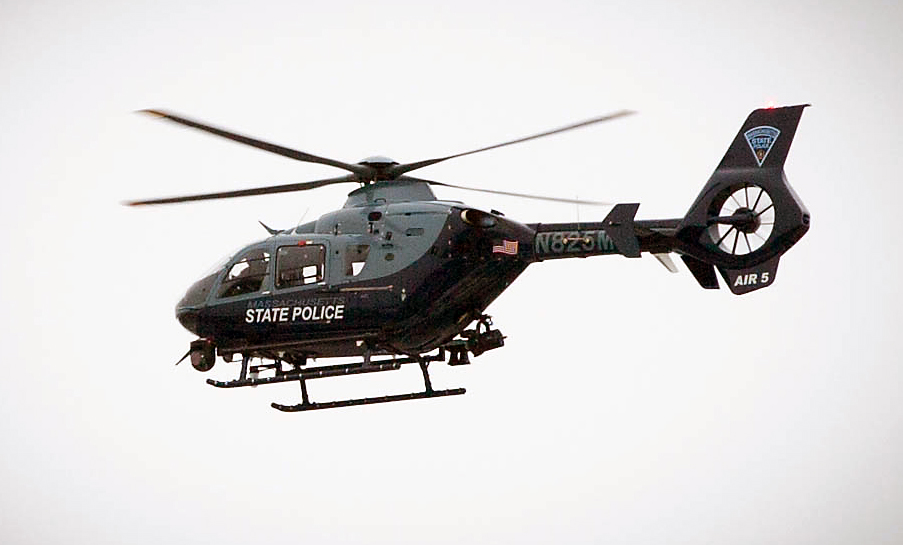
Taken while hovering over Worcester, Massachusetts, on January 14, 2015

The State Police Air Wing has provided the Commonwealth and its network of first responders with airborne support for over three decades. It currently has a fleet of four turbine helicopters and one fixed-wing aircraft. It is the largest and most comprehensive full-time public safety aviation unit in New England. Aircrews stand ready to respond from three strategically located Air Bases within the state 365 days a year. Currently, the unit consists of 21 pilots and tactical flight officers.

==== Special Tactics and Operations ====
The STOP team serves as the State Police SWAT squad. This unit was created in 1971 and responds to major incidents, hostage situations, dangerous search warrants, arrest warrants, and any other serious events.

==== Special Emergency Response Team ====
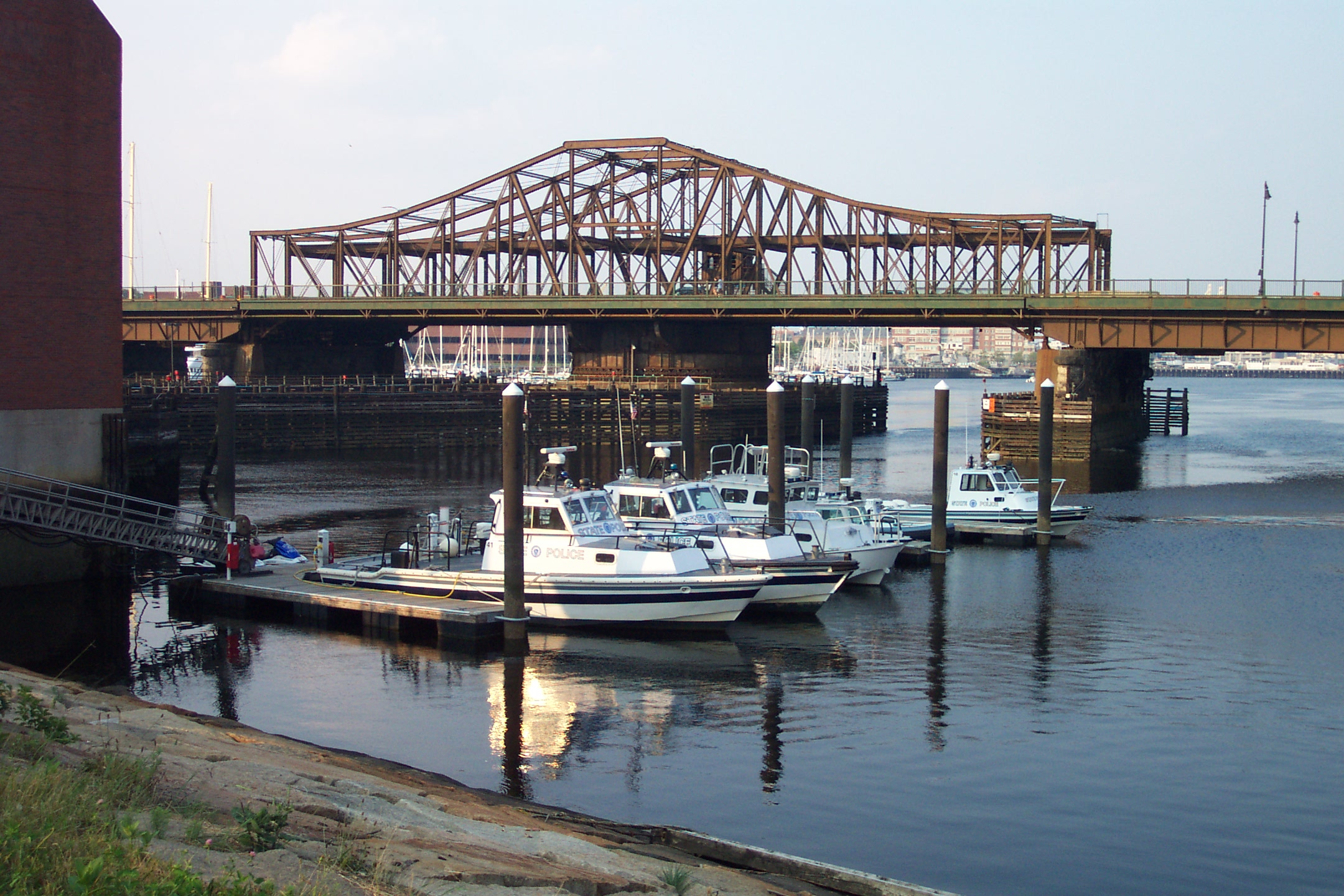
Marine section boats docked in Boston

The SERT team serves as a requestable adjunct to local law enforcement agencies requesting state assistance in civil disturbances, special events, or missing persons searches.

==== Marine Section ====
The Marine Section provides routine river and marine patrol on the Charles River, Mystic River, and in the Boston Harbor Islands National Park. It also provides a statewide response facility, using road-transportable vessels.

==== Motorcycle Unit ====
The motorcycle unit is responsible for dignitary escorts, funeral escorts, prisoner escorts, and many other types of special missions.

==== Public Order Platoon ====
The MSP Public Order Platoon, or POP Team, was previously known as the Mobile Field Force. It is an on-call team composed of about 500 troopers from various barracks and special units who carry specialized equipment in their cruisers at all times to allow for rapid mobilization. All new troopers (within the last 3 Academy classes) are required to be a part of the unit. All other troopers can volunteer for the unit. Its primary purpose is deployment for crowd control, public disturbances, and other major incidents at the request of local public safety officials or State Police Commanders. The POP Team usually deploys several times a year. In October 2007, while coordinating with the Boston Police Department, the unit played a large role in responding to riots in Boston following the Red Sox World Series victory. The POP Team also policed many protests during the George Floyd protests.

==== K9 Unit ====
The State Police K-9 unit deploys approximately 41 highly trained canines to agencies throughout New England for search and rescue, criminal apprehension, narcotics detection, crowd control, missing persons searches, cadaver recovery searches, site security, arson detection, explosive detection, and other missions. Depending on specific mission requirements, members of the canine unit would work in support of, or in conjunction with, other specialized units including the Air Wing, STOP team, Marine Unit, Dive Team, and the SERT team. Their services are available upon request, without cost to the requesting agency. The State Police uses dogs such as Labrador Retrievers, German Shepherds, Dutch Shepherds, and Belgian Malinoises. In order to become a K-9 officer, one must be on the force for at least 5 years. Troopers also get a Massachusetts State Police K-9 cruiser.

==== Mounted Unit ====
The State Police Mounted Unit is an elite unit in the State Police. It consists of 15-25 police horses. This group of specialized troopers have been on the force for a minimum of 5 years prior to joining the Mounted Unit. The unit is located in Acton.

==== Dive Team ====
The Dive Team is composed of specially trained troopers who are trained to provide assistance in the expertise of underwater rescue and recovery.

==== Former Troops and Units ====
===== Troop E =====
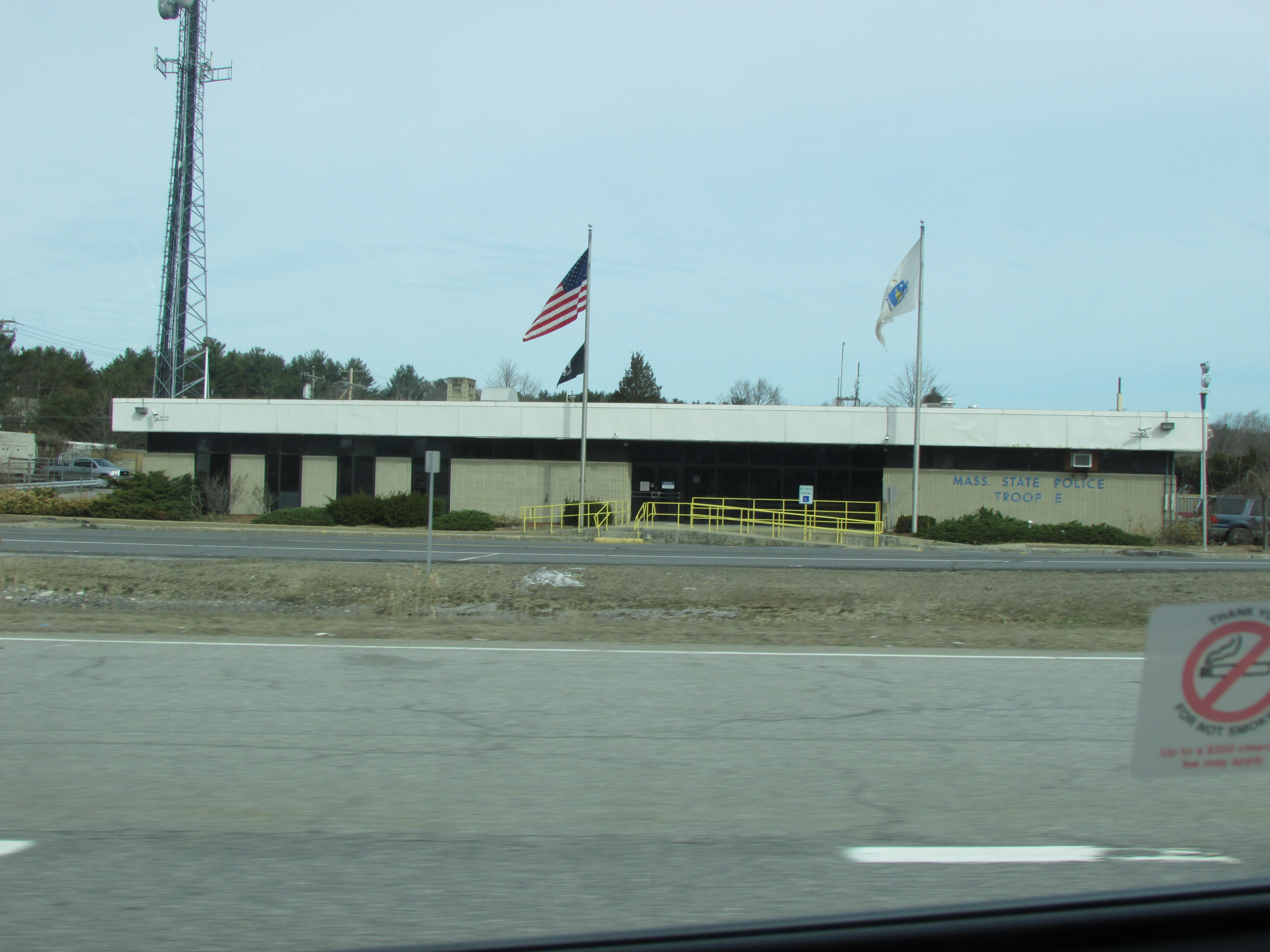
Former E-1 (now H-8) barracks in Weston

Troop "E" was unique in that it did not encompass a section of the commonwealth, but was instead responsible for the Massachusetts Turnpike, which stretches from the New York border to Boston Harbor. Troop "E" headquarters were located in Boston and also patrolled Interstate 93 North and South from the Tip O'Neill Tunnel over the Zakim Bridge to Rutherford Avenue. The troop was eliminated effective May 2, 2018, following accusations of widespread overtime fraud by its members. Troops B, C, and H have taken responsibility for the four barracks and coverage of the Massachusetts Turnpike, while some personnel have been reassigned to Troop F for staff balancing.

Troop E Barracks were located in:

- E–1 Weston – Now part of Troop H (H–8)
- E–2 Charlton – Now part of Troop C (C–10)
- E–3 Westfield – Now part of Troop B (B–8)
- E–4 Tunnels – Now part of Troop H (H–9)

== Division of Investigative Services ==
=== Detective units ===
The Commonwealth is divided into 11 State Police detective units that work out of various district attorneys' offices. Boston, Pittsfield, Springfield, and Worcester are the only cities in the Commonwealth that have the authority to investigate homicides. This responsibility is granted through the District Attorney's Office in each city's respective county. According to Massachusetts General Law, all homicides are under the control of the District Attorney in the county where they occur. Only the District Attorney can delegate the responsibility of investigating homicides to another party. In Springfield and Worcester, it is the captain in charge of the Detective Bureau, and in Boston, it is the commander of the Homicide Unit. The various district attorneys' offices investigate all other homicides in any other cities or towns. The detective units also investigate many other major crimes and serious incidents.

- Berkshire State Police Detective Unit
- Bristol State Police Detective Unit
- Cape & Islands State Police Detective Unit
- Essex State Police Detective Unit
- Franklin/Hampshire State Police Detective Unit
- Hampden State Police Detective Unit
- Middlesex State Police Detective Unit
- Norfolk State Police Detective Unit
- Plymouth State Police Detective Unit
- Suffolk State Police Detective Unit
- Worcester State Police Detective Unit

=== Attorney General's Office ===
The detective unit in the Attorney General's office is composed of the drug unit, the computer crimes unit, and various other specialized investigative squads. The unit investigates everything from white-collar crime to drug distribution.

=== Violent Fugitive Apprehension Section ===
The VFAS is tasked with apprehending the commonwealth's most violent and elusive fugitives. The unit works with various local and federal agencies and is part of numerous task forces.

=== Gang Unit ===
The Gang Unit is a statewide specialty unit established to suppress criminal gang activity, investigate gang related crimes, and gather intelligence on known and suspected gang members. Gang Unit duties include street-level narcotics enforcement, weapons enforcement, criminal investigation, and special operations. The Gang Unit assists local cities and towns by conducting undercover narcotics operations and by providing additional officers to patrols dedicated to combating gang activity in high crime areas. In addition to these activities, the Gang Unit also provides local police departments with personnel, intelligence, expertise, and training specific to battling gang-related crime. The Gang Unit maintains partnerships with, and provides gang awareness training to, schools, corporations, social service agencies, probation officers, trial courts, District Attorneys' offices, and civilian groups. The Gang Unit's primary objective is to improve the quality of life of all citizens adversely affected by gang activity.

=== Fire and Explosion Investigation Section ===
Specially trained Massachusetts State Police detectives have functioned as State Fire Marshal investigators for more than fifty years. At present, the Fire & Explosion Investigative Section (F&EIS) consists of thirty-eight full-time members who make up the Fire Investigations and Hazardous Devices (Bomb Squad) units. F&EIS also consists of eight bomb techs, five bomb dogs and five accelerant detector dogs. Each unit has its own self-contained command and control structure and a specific jurisdiction to serve. Many of the investigators have been cross-trained to assist the other sections in time of need.

=== Crime Lab ===
The main Massachusetts State Police Crime Lab is located in Maynard. There are several laboratory substations spread throughout the Commonwealth. The lab serves law enforcement agencies and District Attorneys throughout the Commonwealth, providing a wide array of support to facilitate effective investigations and criminal prosecutions. The Crime Lab examines evidence that can be used to help tie criminals to their crimes, victims to their assailants and exonerate innocent suspects. The Ballistics Section and Crime Scene Services Section are served by sworn personnel.

The lab is broken up into sections and units:

- Arson & Explosives Unit
- Ballistics Section
- CODIS Unit
- Criminalistics Section
- Crime Scene Services Section
- Digital Evidence & Multimedia Section (DEMS)
- DNA Unit
- Drug Unit
- Evidence Control Unit
- Identification Section
- Office of Alcohol Testing
- Toxicology Unit
- Trace Analysis Unit

=== Governor's Auto Theft Strike Force ===
 The State Police Auto Theft unit is equipped with extremely stealthy vehicles which are outfitted with the latest laptop computers, LPR (License Plate Recognition) systems, and LoJack systems. The unit's main task is investigating motor vehicle theft and chop shops, and it performs a large amount of surveillance. This force was disbanded at the end of 2012

== Division of Homeland Security & Preparedness ==
This division was formed in 2017 and oversees the Commonwealth Fusion Center and the Preparedness and Planning Section, which contains a Watch Center that is open 24 hours a day. The fusion center's job is to collect and analyze intelligence relating to terrorism and criminal activity, which is then shared among other law enforcement agencies. The Fusion Center is based in Maynard, Massachusetts and is overseen by a Major.

The Preparedness and Planning section oversees security planning for major Massachusetts events such as the Boston Marathon and Boston Pops Fireworks Spectacular among others. It is also responsible for response planning to critical incidents and natural disasters. It is located at State Police Headquarters in Framingham and is overseen by a Major.

== Division of Standards & Training ==
Recruit and in-service training for the Massachusetts State Police takes place at the MSP academy located centrally in Massachusetts at 340 West Brookfield Road in New Braintree. Prior to the 1992 merger, the Division of State Police's Training Academy was located in Framingham. This facility now houses the Department of State Police General Headquarters.

Becoming a trooper is a competitive process. Approximately 14,000 men and women took the written entrance exam in June 2002. Out of that, only a few hundred were selected to become members of the MSP. After receiving a conditional job offer, the recruit has to make it through 24 weeks of paramilitary training as part of a Recruit Training Troop (RTT). As of April 2009, the State Police no longer administers its own standalone examination for appointment to the department. The State Police now generates a prospective list from candidates that take the Massachusetts Police Officer Civil Service examination who elect to be considered for appointment to the State Police; this is the same examination that is used by many municipal departments and the MBTA. The Environmental Police administer their own civil service examination.

On October 17, 2011, the 80th RTT began training. This was the first class in over five years. During the 24 weeks of training, the recruit lives at the academy Monday through Friday. The 80th RTT class began with 250 trainees, adding 25 trainees in the first two weeks of training as others departed the program. Their day starts at 5:30 a.m. and goes until 8 p.m., with lights out around 9:30. The recruits attend over 98 academic classes and must pass 10 cumulative exams with a passing score of 70%. Along with classes, recruits have to take part in daily physical regimens such as running and weightlifting. The 80th RTT graduated a record 208 new troopers on March 9, 2012.

The academy takes a toll both mentally and physically on the recruit, and many recruits do not make it through. The typical academy washout rate is around 28-30%. For example, when the 77th RTT started in November 2004, there were 180 recruits. During the first week, 44 recruits dropped out and 34 new recruits had to be added in. By the end of the then 26 weeks, only 137 graduated.

As of the 83rd RTT, there is no more backfilling of the academy class. The 83rd RTT began with 247 troops and is expected to graduate around 175 in January 2018.

The academy also hosts the biannual Massachusetts State Police Student Trooper Program. The Student Trooper program is an intensive, one-week, residential learning experience for young adults, ages 15–17.

== Demographics ==
As of June 2000, the Massachusetts State Police had the following demographics:

- Male: 91%
- Female: 9%
- White: 89%
- African-American/Black: 11%

The MSP is one of the few State Police Departments in the US where the percentage of African American officers (11%) is significantly greater than that of the state population (6.97%).

== Compensation ==
As of 2017, the Massachusetts State Police average pay for a state trooper was $145,413, with three troopers earning over $300,000, and 245 troopers (12% of the workforce) earning over $200,000. A trooper's base pay is augmented by working multiple details, directing traffic, overtime shifts, or providing security at special events.

Former Massachusetts inspector general Greg Sullivan criticized state police overtime as excessive, pointing out an unusual number of troopers who earned more in 2017 than the governor of the state. He cited the use of state police instead of civilian employees to direct traffic at construction details and Logan Airport as examples of wasteful spending. Sullivan argued that the reason overtime pay is so large is that the troopers who make overtime assignments also partake of the benefits of overtime, leaving no incentive to reduce the practice. In 2017, 24 troopers earned more than $100,000 in overtime, and 20 in Troop F earned more than $250,000, a fact which was not revealed until missing payroll records were noticed by the Boston Globe.

In 2024, State Police Detective Captain Thomas McCarthy earned a base pay of $224,007 along with $349,815 in overtime to combine for over $570,000 that year.

=== Perks and extra benefits ===
Along with their base salary and overtime, troopers have other benefits to include:

- Troopers receive hazard bonus pay of $700 annually.
- Troopers who commute 75 miles or more in one-way travel from home receive $75 each week.
- State police employees who work in civilian clothing for 10 days or more each calendar month receive a stipend of $62.50 per month.
- State police employees who work a five-day workweek are compensated an extra 17 days off per year. This time off is to align with employees who work four days on duty, then get two days off.

== Controversies ==
=== State Police Academy hazing scandals ===
In September 2005, an investigation was begun after allegations of illegal hazing at the State Police Training Academy were brought to light. A recruit who voluntarily dropped out the academy accused the academy staff of waterboarding her by placing her head in a toilet bowl. The investigation found that the recruit was told to inspect the toilet bowl after doing an inadequate job of cleaning the toilet. As a result of the investigation, with pressure from then-Governor Mitt Romney, three troopers were removed from their positions, including the Academy Commandant, Lt. Richard Lane. Other demoted instructors included Trooper Eric Baldwin. The 78th Recruit Training Troop graduated in December 2005.

In 2022, staff were reassigned after recruits got blisters from doing an unauthorized exercise involving bear crawls on hot pavement. In 2023, an unusually high number of recruits, 46%, dropped out within the first two weeks, with some complaining of hazing.

On September 13, 2024, trainee Enrique Delgado-Garcia died after suffering knocked-out teeth, a skull injury, and a broken neck; his body was covered in bruises. State police said the injuries occurred during a boxing training exercise, which they have suspended; the Division of Standards and Training was tasked with reviewing academy training programs. Delgado-Garcia was sworn in as an officer before he died. The class's graduation was met with protesters demanding a faster and more transparent investigation into his death. Because Delgado-Garcia had worked in the Worcester District Attorney's office as a victim witness advocate, a private trial lawyer, David Meier, was appointed to perform the investigation.

Delgado-Garcia had complained to a friend that the academy was "torture". Another recruit that year complained of mental abuse going beyond what is needed for training, including bullying and racist remarks.

=== Sgt. Brian O'Hare scandal ===
In February 2006, a respected state police sergeant, Brian O'Hare, was arrested by the FBI after soliciting what he thought was an underage boy for sex, who was actually an undercover FBI Agent. O'Hare was discharged from the state police and subsequently sentenced to 5 years in federal prison.

=== Allegations of internal racial discrimination ===
In March 2017 The Boston Globe reported on allegations of discrimination within the State Police against minority state troopers.

=== Alli Bibaud scandal ===
In October 2017, a state police arrest report of a judge's daughter, Alli Bibaud, was changed to remove an embarrassing and incriminating statement ("Do You Know How Many People I Had To Blow To Get That,") concerning how she obtained the heroin she allegedly possessed. The report was allegedly changed due to Dudley District Court Judge Tim Bibaud calling District Attorney Joseph Early and Colonel Richard McKeon, who in turn directed Major Susan Anderson to have the statement removed. On November 7, 2017, the trooper who was ordered to change his report, Ryan Sceviour, sued the leadership of the state police for reversal of the discipline he received for including the embarrassing and incriminating statements in his report, as well as an official apology, lawyers fees, and punitive damages. On November 11, 2017, Colonel Richard McKeon retired in the midst of the scandal.

=== Leigha Genduso scandal ===
In February 2018, a story broke that Trooper Leigha Genduso, who was assigned to the K-9 unit, was hired by the state police in spite of testifying during grand jury proceedings targeting her former boyfriend, before her hire as first a civilian dispatcher and then state trooper, that she smoked marijuana daily, sold marijuana in amounts up to 10 pounds at a time, took various other prescription drugs not prescribed to her, and laundered money from her former boyfriend's drug profits. There was also information from "many sources" that Genduso's boyfriend at the time of her hire, then-Major (eventually Lieutenant Colonel) Daniel Risteen, used his influence to gain her favorable treatment and highly desirable assignments usually only offered to troopers with many years seniority.

On February 23, 2018, Lieutenant Colonel Risteen abruptly retired from the state police.

On Friday, August 24, 2018, Leigha Genduso resigned from the Massachusetts State Police.

=== Overtime theft probe ===
On March 20, 2018, Attorney General Maura Healey announced that her office was reviewing the "apparent discrepancies between overtime paid and actual patrols worked," by 21 state troopers of the Troop E division. Of the 21 state troopers, 19 were active, one was retired and another, Trooper Matthew Sheehan, was already suspended due to racist messages he posted online. Colonel Kerry Gilpin addressed the media and said one of the alleged offenders put in for as many as 100 no-show shifts during 2016.

On April 2, 2018, Governor Baker announced the elimination of Troop E due to the ongoing overtime investigation that found dozens of active and former troopers allegedly putting in for overtime shifts for which they did not work. State Police Colonel Kerry Gilpin also announced that location of State Police cruisers will be tracked by Global Positioning System (GPS) technology known as automatic vehicle Locator technology, and the state police will also develop a body camera program.

On June 27, 2018, the Federal Bureau of Investigation agents arrested three Massachusetts state troopers for allegedly stealing thousands of dollars for overtime work they didn't complete in calendar year 2016. The troopers allegedly took steps to conceal their fraud by altering tickets written to make it look like the citations were issued during claimed overtime shifts. Sometimes tickets submitted by the troopers were fictitious or never actually issued to known motorists. Each of the three troopers were charged with a single embezzlement count.

In July 2020, the Massachusetts State Police announced disciplinary action against 15 former Troop E members who had been implicated in the overtime investigation but had not been criminally charged. The troopers received suspensions ranging from 60 to 841 days and were ordered to pay restitution ranging from $2,941 to $15,901. They were also reduced in seniority, removed from promotional lists, barred from programmed overtime for two years, and required to complete remedial time-and-attendance training. Mark Augusta was among the 15 troopers disciplined. In January 2023, the Commonwealth reached a settlement with Augusta concerning $10,835 in overtime that it alleged he had been paid for but had not worked. The Massachusetts Office of the Inspector General subsequently reported that Augusta repaid the full amount owed under the restitution agreement.

=== Hidden payroll data ===
On March 26, 2018, the Boston Globe reported that payroll records for the 140-trooper Massachusetts State Police Troop F, which provides law enforcement and security for all properties of the Massachusetts Port Authority, have been hidden from public view and weren't filed with the state comptroller for several years. Almost 80 percent of the troopers assigned to Troop F earned more than Massachusetts governor Charlie Baker. Pay for the troopers comes from the Massachusetts Port Authority, but the police troopers are employees of the Massachusetts State Police and operations are overseen by commanders of the State Police.

After the Boston Globe report came out, Governor Baker said that the act of not disclosing years of payroll records for Troop F of the State Police was "clearly deliberate," and state Comptroller Thomas Shack demanded to know if other state agencies were failing to reveal other payroll records.

On March 30, 2018, the Globe reported that a Troop F Detective Lieutenant earned more than $300,000 each year between 2015 and 2017. The Lieutenant was the highest-paid employee of the Massachusetts State Police for the years 2014–2016.

=== Michael Proctor; Karen Read investigation ===
The July 2024 mistrial and June 2025 acquittal of Karen Read on all major charges in death of John O'Keefe drew attention to the role of disgraced and eventually fired State Police Trooper Michael D. Proctor in the investigation.

In April 2024, during opening statements in the first murder trial of Karen Read, the defense lawyers indicated that they had evidence to show Trooper Proctor, the lead investigator in the death of John O'Keefe, texted vulgar and indecent messages relating to the defendant. In June 2024, during the trial, Read's defense attorneys read the messages into the court record while Proctor took the stand. According to a search of his phone, on the night of January 29, 2022, the day O'Keefe's body was found, Proctor texted his longtime friends, "they'll be some serious charges brought on the girl [Read]", prior to an official investigation taking place. During the same conversation, in response to a friend asking "is she hot at least?", Proctor replied "from all accounts, he didn't do anything wrong. She's a whack job cunt", going on to say "she's a babe. Weird Fall River accent, though. No ass." In later text messages, it was further revealed that Proctor was aware of and made crude remarks of Read's Crohn's disease, writing "she's got a leaky baloon knot. Leaks poo."

During the investigation, it was revealed that Proctor continued to use disparaging language against Read and her defense lawyers. In a text message group chat, Proctor sent a photograph of one of Read's lawyers, David Yannetti, saying "funny, I'm going through his retarded client's phone. No nudes so far...I hate that man, I truly hate him". It was also reveleaded during the investigation that Proctor was texting others about Read committing suicide "hopefully she kills herself". Read's defense lawyers contested that the text messages sent by the lead investigator in the case against her were proof that she was a scapegoat from the onset of the investigation, a claim that Masschussets State Police and Proctor denied.

In July 2024, the same day that Judge Beverly Cannone declared a mistrial in the case against Read, Massachusetts State Police announced that Proctor was relieved of duty, following an internal review, separate from the Read investigation. Proctor remained on the Massachusetts State Police payroll, while not being able to serve or function as a state trooper pending a disciplinary hearing.

On July 9, 2024, Proctor was officially suspended without pay after the Massachusetts State Police Col. John Mawn accepted a board recommendation for such a measure. It was announced that an internal investigation was still ongoing. "I think I've been very clear and I want to remain very clear. Misconduct in any way, shape or form by the Massachusetts State Police will not be tolerated", Mawn said. Later, in March 2025, Proctor was dishonorably discharged from the Massachusetts State Police after being found guilty on three charges of unsatisfactory performace, and one charge relating to consuming alcohol while on duty. Proctor's family said the decision lacked precedent and "unfairly exploits and scapegoats one of their own, a trooper with a 12-year unblemished record".

In June 2026, Karen Read filed an 87-page lawsuit against the Massachusetts State Police and Canton Police Department, alleging that "an embedded culture of bigotry, misogyny, systemic failures, and institutional rot" led to her being wrongfully targeted in the death of O'Keefe. As part of the lawsuit, it was revelaed that Proctor exchanged derogatory and inflammatory text messages with Canton police Sargeant Sean Goode, who was also named in the lawsuit. According to phone records, Proctor and Goode texted disparaging remarks against people of color, Jewish people, as well as making sexually suggestive remarks towards women. Goode texted Proctor "she's a Jew...so def puts out", as well as calling New England Patriots owner Robert Kraft a "terrible cunty Jew". In another instance, Proctor texted Goode about a vehicle crash in Canton, adding "actually, take your time, I saw a nigger was involved, so I wouldn't rush if you're working. Let them die", as well as saying "it should be 'punch a nigger day' in Canton today out of retribution. Any shine u see blast it in the face", and "America sucks....Hitler was really on to something then the fucking US has to step in and ruin it". Goode also called Boston Mayor Michelle Wu a "little cunt" and said Massachusetts Governor Maura Healey should "suck my dick". Read's lawsuit alledges that Proctor and Goode are "completely and unquestionably unfit to hold positions of authority with MSP and CPD, much less to play important roles — or in Ms. Read’s case, the primary role — in homicide investigations". Both Massachusetts State Police and Canton police released statements calling the messages abhorrent and hateful.

== In popular culture ==
- Mystery Street (1950) features Ricardo Montalbán as MSP Detective Lieutenant Peter Moralas, assigned to the Barnstable County District Attorney's Office, investigating the death of a young woman whose skeleton is found buried in a Cape Cod beach. He seeks assistance from the Department of Legal Medicine at Harvard University.
- The Departed (2006) is about two spies in the MSP's Special Investigations Unit, with Staff Sergeant Colin Sullivan (Matt Damon) being planted on the MSP as a spy for Frank Costello (Jack Nicholson), an Irish Mob boss, while Trooper Billy Costigan (Leonardo DiCaprio) is an undercover cop assigned to infiltrate Costello's crew. Director Martin Scorsese asked the MSP if he could use actual logos, badges, and color schemes on the uniforms and the cruisers, but was denied.
- Ben Benson's series of novels featuring Massachusetts State Troopers such as high-ranking Chief of Detectives Wade Paris and rookie Trooper Ralph Lindsey, appearing mostly in the 1950s, were among the earliest examples of police procedurals. When Benson died, another writer, Roy Stratton (the great-grandson-in-law of Charles Dickens), started a new series about the MSP for the same publisher, Mill-Morrow, featuring Trooper Scott Gregory; but the series ended after only two books.
- The agency serves as a partial setting for Dennis Lehane's novel Mystic River and its film version, in which the characters played by Kevin Bacon and Laurence Fishburne are MSP detectives.
- The Robert B. Parker character Spenser is said to have been with the MSP, specifically as a detective with the Suffolk County District Attorney's office. He frequently interacts with an MSP homicide detective named Captain Healy (who also appears in the Jesse Stone novels) and worked with an MSP trooper named Brian Lundquist in the novel Pale Kings and Princes.
- An MSP cruiser comes to a halt at the Wordloaf Conference in The Simpsons episode "Moe'N'a Lisa", having pursued the Simpsons into Vermont (minute 11:50 in the episode).
- Norman Rockwell's famous painting The Runaway depicts a Massachusetts State Trooper and a young boy at a lunch counter. Rockwell lived in Massachusetts for much of his life. Actual MSP Trooper Dick Clemens is the Trooper portrayed in the painting. The boy's name is Edward Locke.
- In Edge of Darkness, Ray Winstone's character is killed by a Massachusetts State Trooper.
- In R.I.P.D., an MSP Air Wing helicopter takes part in the raid where Ryan Reynolds' character is killed.
- In Patriots Day, an MSP trooper stands guard over Martin Richard's corpse until he can be taken away by ambulance, at which point he salutes. Other troopers appear sporadically throughout the film, and the Superintendent at the time, Colonel Timothy Alben, is a character in it portrayed by Charles Luise but is simply credited as "Massachusetts State Police Colonel."
- The Showtime original series City on a Hill features multiple MSP troopers assigned to the Suffolk County DA's Office.

== See also ==
- Boston police strike
- C3 policing
- Highway patrol
- List of defunct law enforcement agencies of Massachusetts
- List of law enforcement agencies in Massachusetts
- Massachusetts Department of Correction
- Massachusetts Environmental Police
- The Officer's Guide to Police Pistolcraft
- State police (United States)

== Bibliography ==
- French and Electric Blue: The Massachusetts State Police, A History, William F. Powers, 1979, Printed by Sullivan Bros., Printers, Lowell, Massachusetts
- Enforcement Odyssey, Massachusetts State Police: A new Commemorative History of One of the Nations Premiere State Law Enforcement Agencies by William F. Powers, 1998. Turner Publishing Company, Paducah, Kentucky. Library of Congress Catalog No. 97-61567, ISBN 1-56311-388-0.
