= Kit Parker =

American biophysicist and soldier

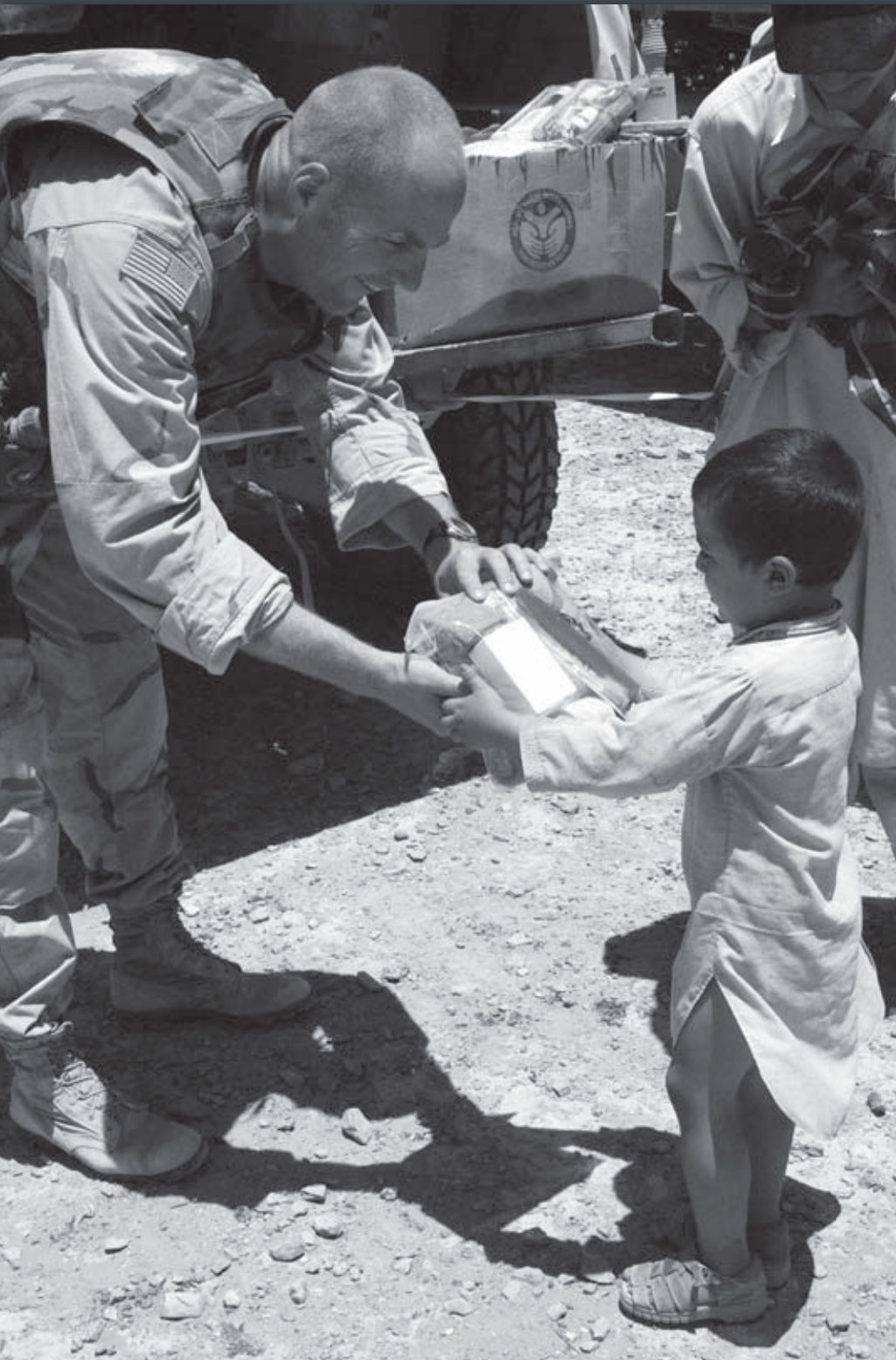
- Captain Kit Parker hands out a hygiene pack to a boy in Kandahar Province, Afghanistan (2007 or earlier)
- Born: Kevin Kit Parker
- Military career
- Branch: United States Army Reserve
- Rank: Lieutenant colonel
- Other work: Faculty at Wyss Institute for Biologically Inspired Engineering, Harvard University
- Website: diseasebiophysics.seas.harvard.edu

Kevin Kit Parker is a colonel in the United States Army Reserve and the Tarr Family Professor of Bioengineering and Applied Physics at Harvard University. His research includes cardiac cell biology and tissue engineering, traumatic brain injury, and biological applications of micro- and nanotechnologies. Additional work in his laboratory has included fashion design, marine biology, and the application of counterinsurgency methods to countering transnational organized crime.

== Early life and education ==
Parker attended Boston University's College of Engineering and graduated in 1989. He earned a Master of Science degree in 1993 and a doctoral degree in applied physics in 1998 from Vanderbilt University.

== Military career ==
Parker is a paratrooper who has served in the United States Army since 1992. After the September 11 attacks, he served two tours of duty in Afghanistan.

In addition to his combat tours, Parker conducted two missions into Afghanistan as part of the Gray Team in 2011.

== Civilian career ==
Initially, at Harvard the focus of his research was heart muscle cells. He turned to traumatic brain injury in 2005 after realizing that an Army friend of his, who had received injuries in an IED blast in Iraq in 2005, was suffering from an undiagnosed medical condition rather than a psychological problem.

Other research of Parker's includes designing camouflage using skin cells of cuttlefish and the use of a cotton candy machine to make dressings for wounds.

Parker served on the Defense Science Research Council for nearly a decade, the Defense Science Board Task Force on Autonomy, and has consulted to other US government agencies as well as the medical device and pharma industry.

In 2011, Parker headed Harvard's committee for reintroducing ROTC at the university.

In July 2016, it was announced that The Disease Biophysics Group at Harvard, led by Kit Parker, created a tissue-engineered soft-robotic ray that swims using wave-like fin motions, and turns according to externally applied light cues.

== C3 course controversy ==
In January 2021, students at the Harvard School of Engineering and Applied Sciences created a petition objecting to Parker's course on Counter-Criminal Continuum policing, or C3 policing. Titled "Data Fusion in Complex Systems: A Case Study," the course promised to engage graduate student researchers to analyze the efficacy of C3 techniques in Springfield, Massachusetts.

The petition objected to the lack of research into the potential harms of C3 policing, particularly the ethical implications for marginalized communities. The Dean of the Engineering School soon announced the class was canceled, and committed to reviewing the process of vetting class offerings.

== Awards ==
- Bronze Star
- Army Commendation Medal with V device
- Combat Infantryman Badge
