= Christian Macedonia =

American military doctor

- Military career
- Branch: United States Army
- Rank: Colonel
- Commands: the Gray Team

Christian Macedonia (COL, US Army, ret) is a medical doctor and a retired United States Army officer. From 2009 to 2011, he led the Gray Team which was tasked to improve the care of American forces serving in Iraq and Afghanistan.

== Early life and education ==
He attended Bucknell University and graduated with a degree in chemistry in 1985. He attended medical school at the Uniformed Services University.

== Military career ==
He served as an ambulance platoon leader in Goeppingen, Germany for three years with the 1st Infantry Division, from 1985-1988.

He was part of a medical team on Mount Everest (Everest Extreme Expedition, or E3) in 1998 and 1999, caring for patients and analyzing biometrics for telemedicine monitoring.

On 9/11 he was a first-responder to the attack on Washington DC as part of the medical unit attached to the US Park Service SWAT Team. He was awarded the Bronze Star and Combat Action Badge (Battle of Fallujah) for his service in the Iraq war.

From January 2009 and September 2011, he commanded the Gray Team and served as chief medical adviser to the former Chairman of the Joint Chiefs of Staff, Admiral Michael Mullen.

He served as a program manager at the Defense Advanced Research Projects Agency, where one of his projects involved developing new technologies to treat brain and spine injuries. Another program he oversaw, Biochronicity, examined how biological clocks affect living systems.

He has since retired from the military after 27 years of distinguished service.

== Civilian Medical and Scientific Career ==
Currently, runs a successful maternal fetal medicine practice that he co-founded in Lancaster, Pennsylvania, Lancaster Maternal Fetal Medicine.

Dr. Macedonia also serves as Chief Executive Officer for iReprogram, a biotech company with a patented technology for direct cell reprogramming, based in Ann Arbor, Michigan. Their system determines which transcription factors to deliver to an initial cell type, and the timing during the cell cycle for the delivery, to directly reprogram the cell into any other cell type, without the need for intermediary steps. Early stage angel investors include Gil Omenn, Roger Newton, and Max Wicha.
