= Gray Team =

The Joint Neurosciences Inspection Team
- Active: January 2009 to September 2011
- Country: United States
- Nickname: Gray Team

Commanders
- Current commander: Colonel Christian Macedonia, MD

The Gray Team, currently evolved into the Grey Team, and more formally known as the Joint Neurosciences Inspection Team, was the name given to a series of special inspection units commissioned by the Joint Chiefs of Staff to serve as mechanism to help improve the care of American forces serving in Iraq and Afghanistan. Their missions were particularly focused on the "invisible wounds of war" such as traumatic brain injury or post traumatic stress.

The original Gray Team was composed of hand-selected active duty members all of whom had prior deployment experience in a combat zone and relevant medical expertise . The original team had at least one representative from each of the four armed services branches. Col Macedonia appointed Col Michael Jaffee to be the clinical lead given his role as National Director of the Defense and Veterans Brain Injury Center (DVBIC).

The original Gray Team traveled to a number of deployed bases and combat medical facilities from all branches of service across both Iraq and Afghanistan. They were focused on identifying barriers for implementation of screening and acute management of TBI and concussion. The team reported directly to the Joint Chiefs of Staff. The largest impact was changing the military’s system from a symptom-based system in which a service member had to admit to having a symptom from a concussion or TBI to an incident-based system in which any service member involved in a blast or situation considered high risk for concussion would be screened and evaluated regardless of whether or not they self-reported any symptoms. This represented a paradigm shift and was the first time military combat policy was combined with medical guidelines. This paradigm shift has had lasting impact and is still in place today.

Subsequent Gray Team missions focused on having civilian researchers who worked with the military to have an opportunity to experience the environment and forward medical facilities and to further evaluate the implementation of changes established by the original Gray Team.

The military Gray Team should not be confused with the non-profit organization Grey team who was inspired by the military team to adapt the name in order to further help veterans suffering from the invisible wounds of war.

Notable members of the original Gray Team which operated overseas as part of the military were: Colonel Christian Macedonia (Army/JCS), lead Colonel Michael Jaffee (Air Force/DVBIC), co-lead Colonel Geoff Ling (Army/DARPA) Colonel James Hancock (USN/USMC) – now RADM Hancock , Lieutenant Colonel Shean Phelps (Army/USAARL), Special Operations advisor - now NASA JSC , Major Justin Campbell (Army/JCS), Military Police advisor

As of 2016, a non profit was formed as the Grey Team by U.S. military veteran Cary Reichbach, implementing solutions for U.S. military active-duty and veterans to reduce and eliminate PTSD related suicides. www.GreyTeam.org

Grey Team's comprehensive health and wellness programs directly heal all the invisible wounds of war including, but not limited to: traumatic brain injuries, post-traumatic stress disorder, chronic pain, self-medication, and isolation.

To accomplish this goal, Grey Team has built a headquarters in Boca Raton, Florida complete with personal training, infrared detoxification, low-level laser therapy, acupuncture for pain relief, 3D body scanning, community safe-spaces, and more.

History: There were four teams in total between January 2009 and September 2011, composed of service men and women from across the armed services as well as civilian scientist volunteers. Each member of the team was nominated by the various armed services and approved to serve on the team by Admiral Michael Mullen, the Chairman of the Joint Chiefs of Staff. Each Gray Team was commanded by Colonel Christian Macedonia, MD, the Chairman’s medical sciences advisor.

== Origins ==
Admiral Michael Mullen assumed the office of Chairman of the Joint Chiefs of Staff in August 2007. By that point, there had been numerous reports including print newspaper stories by Gregg Zoroya at USA Today and the publication of the RAND Report Invisible Wounds of War criticizing the US military’s weak response to traumatic brain injury and post traumatic stress disorder. Determined to avoid the mistakes made in previous conflicts (Agent Orange, Gulf War Syndrome), he established an office within the Joint Staff to work on these issues giving the experts in this office direct daily access. In 2008, he recruited COL Christian Macedonia to be his Medical Sciences Advisor. They jointly worked on the Gray Team concept and launched the first mission in January 2009.

== Nickname ==
The team's name came from the brain's grey matter.

== Notable members ==
Members have included:

- David Brody
- Jim Hancock
- Michael Jaffee
- Geoffrey Ling
- Kit Parker
- Daniel Perl
- Shean Phelps
- Robert L. Koffman
- Paul Hammer
- Justin S. Campbell
