= C3 policing =

Police crime prevention strategy used in Massachusetts, U.S.

Seal of the C3 Policing Task Force, a multi-agency task force in Springfield, Massachusetts between the Springfield Police Department, Hampden County Sheriff's Department, and Massachusetts State Police

C3 policing ("C3" for "Counter Criminal Continuum"), also known as the Avghani model, is a crime prevention strategy for civilian law enforcement, loosely developed from military counterinsurgency strategies and currently used in the cities of Springfield and Chicopee in Hampden County, Massachusetts, United States.

The C3 policing model was created by Michael M. Cutone, a former United States Army Special Forces non-commissioned officer and Massachusetts State Police (MSP) trooper, around 2009. It is centered around community policing, mutual cooperation, and quality of life concerns, to address root issues that cause crime in communities. C3 policing was first used by the MSP, Springfield Police Department (SPD), and Hampden County Sheriff's Department (HCSD) to counter gang and narcotic activities in Springfield's North End section and later other sections of the city. The Chicopee Police Department (CPD) established its own C3 policing units in Chicopee in 2019 and 2023.

Public reaction to C3 policing has generally been positive, and it has been cited as an example of potential police reform initiatives. Crime rate statistics for Springfield since the adoption of C3 policing shows general declines in crime since roughly 2010. However, some criticism arose in 2021 surrounding a university course about C3 policing at Harvard University.

== History ==
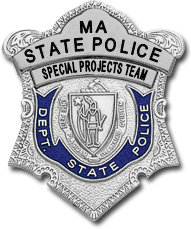
The badge used by the Special Projects Team, the MSP unit responsible for the C3 Policing Task Force

The C3 policing model was created and developed by Michael M. Cutone, a former United States Army Special Forces senior NCO who served for 25 years across three units. In 2006, Cutone returned from a deployment in Avghani, a region north of Tal Afar, Nineveh Governorate, Iraq during the Iraq War, where his unit successfully used counterinsurgency strategies to defeat insurgents in the area. He then joined the Massachusetts State Police as a trooper, assigned to patrol duties in Springfield.

In October 2009, Cutone determined that the counterinsurgency principles he used in Avghani could potentially prove effective in countering heightening gang activity in the North End section of Springfield, and devised the C3 policing model. The model was met with positive responses from some North End residents and public officials, with support from the MSP Superintendent in 2012. It has since been expanded into the South End, Mason Square, and Forest Park sections.

In 2019, the Chicopee Police Department (CPD) in Springfield's neighboring city of Chicopee formed a C3 policing unit in downtown Chicopee after a notable spike in crime in the area. The unit was temporarily readjusted in 2021 due to staffing issues, but was later restored around January 2023. In April 2023, the CPD established a second C3 policing unit in the Willimansett district to counter violent crime and domestic violence there.

== Strategies ==
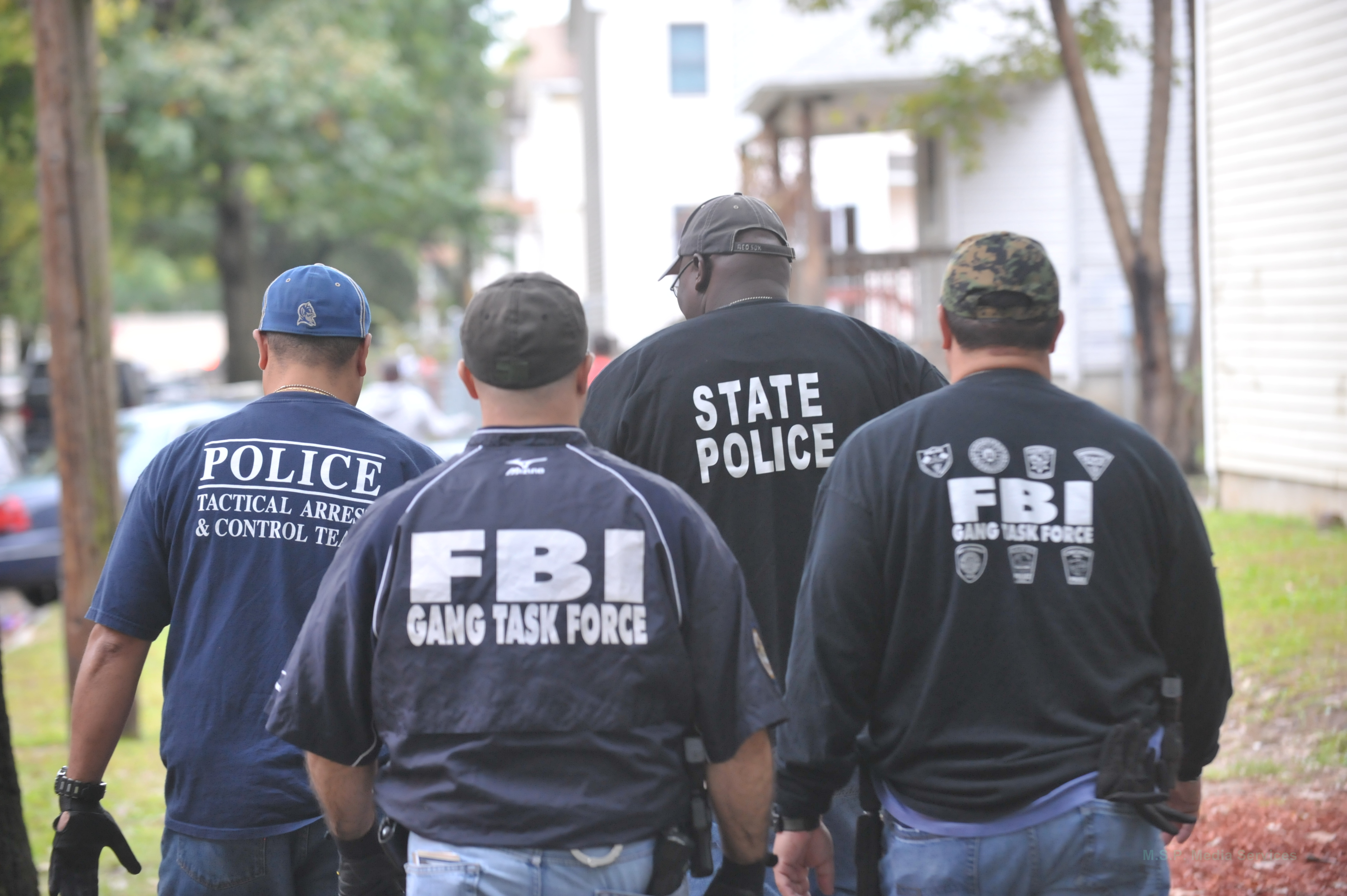
SPD officers, MSP troopers, and FBI agents during an operation part of the C3 policing initiative in Springfield

The goals of C3 policing are to create a safe and secure environment; promote relationships and cooperation between law enforcement and the community; reduce gang activity and violence; and establish positive youth and parental programs. C3 policing uses cooperation between law enforcement agencies, private businesses, and the public to "detect, disrupt, degrade, and dismantle" criminal activity. These generally consist of monthly community meetings and foot patrols.

== Reception ==
On February 12, 2013, BusinessWest awarded C3 policing The Difference Makers.

Measured Design, a social design research group, has examined C3 policing and its effectiveness.

== Harvard course controversy ==
In January 2021, students at the Harvard John A. Paulson School of Engineering and Applied Sciences created a petition objecting to a course on C3 policing at that school. The course, "ENG-SCI 298R: Data Fusion in Complex Systems: A Case Study" by Professor Kit Parker, was planned to analyze C3 policing and its effects on Springfield. The petition was signed by around 300 students and alumni, and objected to the lack of focus on structural racism, the George Floyd protests, and police abolition, and demanded the class's cancellation and a full review of Parker's conduct. Criticism was also directed at Parker's ties to C3 policing model creator Michael M. Cutone, as well as his lack of expertise on the subject; The Harvard Crimson noted: "he is a cell biology and tissue engineering researcher, [and] does not have a degree in criminal justice, social science, or criminology". Parker objected to the demands, noting that "the primary goal of the course is not an examination of racial bias within the police", denying claims the Springfield Police Department was funding the course, and pointing to academic freedom concerns. After days of student pressure, the school's dean announced the class was cancelled, and committed to reviewing the process of vetting class offerings.
