= The Officer's Guide to Police Pistolcraft =

- Author: Michael E. Conti
- Language: English
- Genre: Training / Instructional
- Publisher: Saber Press
- Publication date: 2009
- Publication place: United States
- Media type: Print (Paperback)
- Pages: 424
- ISBN: 978-0-9772659-0-9

The Officer's Guide to Police Pistolcraft (a sequel to and expansion of the 2007 book Police Pistolcraft) is a 2009 non-fiction book by Michael E. Conti which covers combat-related situations arising in the course of standard law enforcement. Together with Police Pistolcraft, it forms the basis for the current pistol training program of the Massachusetts State Police and has been adopted by a range of other law enforcement jurisdictions.

== Overview ==
The Officer's Guide to Police Pistolcraft describes a method of training and philosophy of pistolcraft developed by Michael E. Conti, an officer of the Massachusetts State police, and follows and expands Conti's 2007 book Police Pistolcraft.

Conti joined the Massachusetts State Police in 1986 and as of 2009 is still a serving officer. During his career, he has held assignments ranging from uniformed patrol, high-crime area community policing, SWAT and special security details, and undercover narcotics and death investigations. Since 1991 he has acted as a professional trainer and holds instructor certifications in various use of force disciplines.

In January 2000, Conti was given the task of setting up and putting into operation a Firearms Training Unit (FTU) for the State Police. The unit was to be responsible for conducting yearly qualification courses of fire for department personnel, and for training academy recruits in firearms use. As part of his work in this role, Conti developed a new style of training which he describes as "reality-based", as he felt that the traditional sight-oriented and marksmanship-based approach that was until that time being used did not meet the needs of police officers on the street.

The new style of training emphasised Applegate-style target focused shooting, complemented by sight-focused precision shooting at appropriate distances. Conti constructed a purpose-built training facility at Massachusetts State Police headquarters to demonstrate his revised training program.

In 2007 Conti used this new training paradigm as the basis of his book Police Pistolcraft. Following the publication of that book, a demand emerged for a text detailing the specific methods of the "new paradigm," which led Conti to write The Officer's Guide to Police Pistolcraft. Conti is also the author of Beyond Pepper Spray: The Complete Guide to Chemical Agents, Delivery Systems, and Protective Masks (Paladin Press, 2002).

== Critical and professional reception ==
The training methods described in The Officer's Guide to Police Pistolcraft are currently in use by the Massachusetts State Police, and the book and associated training philosophy has been adopted by law enforcement agencies in many other jurisdictions.

The critical reception among law enforcement reviewers has been generally positive.

Ralph Mroz of the Police Officers Safety Association, in a review at Officer.com, described the book as "different... and necessary!" He said the book was "written by a consummate police training professional" and went on to say, "I recommend it as highly as I recommended (and continue to recommend) the earlier Police Pistolcraft." Mroz singled out the "frank discussion of the necessary relationship between a professional police officer and his/her skill with arms" as "as refreshing as it is unusual these days".

John Veit reviewed the book in a widely republished article on Law Officer Connect, where he praised the book, calling attention to its plain English language and conversational style. "Some chapters read like a good novel and not a field manual," he said. "They are filled with helpful and practical ways of carrying out the day to day tasks of an officer." He concluded, "This book is a very good read, and promises to be a long standing and authoritative survival guide for police officers as well as others who have a handgun for self defense use."

The Massachusetts Law Encorcement Firearms Instructors & Armorers Association reviewed the book for their publication The Case Head. They said, "The Officer's Guide is full of solid training information, photos and diagrams," and applauded Conti's style, saying, "I could not help but notice how the reader is treated with respect. [...] This will be perfect for the officer who was looking for better firearms training but was unable to get it at their agency." They praised Conti's refusal to enter into a philosophical battle between point-shooting and aimed fire, saying, "The New Paradigm takes the best of all worlds and rolls them into one program." The Association concluded by saying the book "is highly recommended and will be a well used addition to every firearms instructor’s reference library. If you have adopted the New Paradigm, this book should be standard issue for every student you have."

== Contents ==
The Officer's Guide to Police Pistolcraft contains 424 pages, divided into 12 chapters and illustrated with 316 photos and diagrams. It sets out what the author calls "the reality-based new paradigm of police firearms training," a program he claims to have developed in 2000 while serving as the Director of the Massachusetts State Police Firearms Training Unit. It contains helpful and practical advice about carrying out the day-to-day tasks of a law enforcement officer, and also deals with the obligations and responsibilities of "the modern day warrior." It aims to provide specific detail on subjects covered in Police Pistolcraft and instruct on when a law enforcement officer should use their pistol, and how they should use it.

The book focuses on combat and specifically aims to prepare officers to know when to use their pistol and how to use it. The training system covers both sighted and point shooting techniques, drawing on systems of combat pistol shooting and training originating from such diverse sources as World War II and "the dim and dark streets and back alleys of Shanghai."

The book's main emphasis is on pistol training that recognises the reality of day-to-day police operations, rather than the isolated competitive training previously in use.

Specific topics covered include safety, pistol handling and manipulation, basic skills and alternative shooting positions, pistol retention, mental preparation, low light, plainclothes considerations and left-hand shooter considerations. There is a section about the issues that female officers face in both uniformed and plain clothes assignments. An appendix covers revolvers, as the author feels many new recruits in modern law enforcement have never seen one.
