= Springfield Police Department (Massachusetts) =

- Patch of the Springfield Police Department

- Emblem of the Springfield Police Department (as it appears on livery, press release materials)

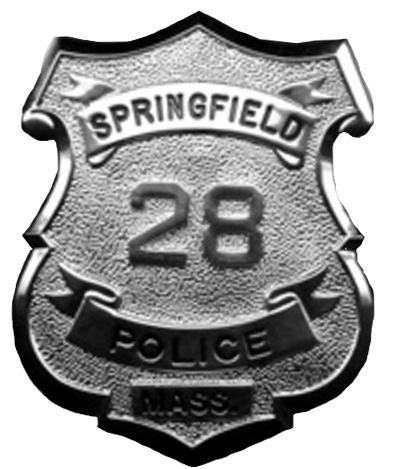
- Badge of the Springfield Police Department

- Flag of Springfield
- Abbreviation: SPD

Agency overview
- Formed: January 27, 1659; 367 years ago (permanent constables appointed); May 25, 1852; 174 years ago (department organized)

Jurisdictional structure
- Operations jurisdiction: Springfield, Massachusetts, United States
- Area: 33.2 square miles (86 km^{2})
- Population: 155,929 (2020)
- Legal jurisdiction: As per operations jurisdiction
- General nature: Local civilian police

Operational structure
- Headquarters: 130 Pearl St; Springfield, MA 01105
- Police Superintendent responsible: Cheryl Clapprood
- Agency executives: William Cochrane, Deputy Chief; Steven Kent, Deputy Chief; Rupert Daniel, Deputy Chief

Website
- Springfield Police Website

The Springfield Police Department is the law enforcement agency responsible for the city of Springfield, Massachusetts. The department consists of about 500 sworn personnel, approximately 420 patrol officers and 80 supervisors.

On July 8, 2020, the U.S. Department of Justice announced that it found the SPD Narcotics Bureau to be engaging in a pattern or practice of excessive force. On April 13, 2022, the DOJ announced that it reached a consent decree with the SPD. The agreement requires a court-appointed independent monitor, improved reporting of uses of force, more training, and better internal investigations of misconduct.

== Organization ==
The Springfield Police Department is divided into several specialized units. The Detective Bureau includes homicide, Juveniles, Narcotics/Firearms investigation Unit, Traffic Unit, Ordinance unit, K-9 unit, Internal Affairs, Crimes Scene, Crime Analysis, Metro Unit, Court, Various federal task forces, photo lab/identification bureau, Auto theft, House Break Squad, Special Victims Unit, Records and the Training Division. Springfield is one of three cities in the Commonwealth that can investigate homicides within its jurisdiction, the other two cities are Boston and Worcester, otherwise the District Attorney has jurisdiction.

== Rank structure ==
- Cadet
- Recruit
- Probationary Officer
- Patrol Officer/Detective
- Sergeant
- Lieutenant
- Captain
- Senior Captain
- Deputy Chief
- Superintendent

== Sectors ==
- The Springfield Police Department uniform division is divided into Sectors, North, South and Central with a Commanding Officer for each of the three sectors.

=== Sectors A-D, G ===
Deputy Chief Rupert Daniel: Commanding Officer

Sector A: Brightwood, Memorial Square (North End) The Beat Management Team for Sector A, meets on the 2nd Thursday of each month at 6pm in the Brightwood Library located in the Brightwood Library on Plainfield Street.

Sector B: Liberty Heights, Hungry Hill, Atwater, and Lower Liberty The Beat Management Team for Sector B meets the 3rd Thursday of the month at the Hungry Hill Senior Center, 773 Liberty Street (former library). The Chairperson is Catherine Mossi.

Sector C: East Springfield The Beat Management Team for Sector C (East Springfield) meets on the 3rd Tuesday of the month at 6:30pm at the East Springfield Neighborhood Council Office, 1437 Carew Street (behind Pottenger School). The Chairperson is John Koski.

Sector D: Indian Orchard Indian Orchard Beat Management Team (Community Police Task Force, 'IOCPTF') meetings for Sector D take place on the 3rd Wednesday of the month at 6pm at the Indian Orchard Citizen's Council Community Room, 117 Main Street in Indian Orchard. The Chairperson is Sandra Babbie.

Sector G: Pine Point and Boston Rd. The Beat Management Team for Sector G meets on the 4th Tuesday of the month at 6pm, at Independence House, 1475 Roosevelt Avenue. The Co-Chairpersons are Kim Dinoia and Mary Kober.

=== Sectors E&F ===
Deputy Chief William Cochrane: Commanding Officer

Sector E: Metro Center, South End, and Maple High-Six Corners The Beat Management Team for Sector E meets on the first Thursday of the month at the First Resource community room at 37 Saratoga Street. All meetings are at 6pm. Shane Milette is the chairperson.

Sector F: McKnight, Old Hill, Upper Hill, Bay The Beat Management Team for Sector F meets on the 3rd Thursday of the month at the Mason Square Library at 5:30pm. Cathy Paquin is the chairperson.

=== Sectors H&I ===
Deputy Chief Steven Kent: Commanding Officer

Sector H: Forest Park, East Forest Park The Sector H Beat Management team meetings are held on the first Wednesday of the month, at 6pm, usually at Sinai Temple, 1100 Dickinson Street and sometimes at the Jewish Community Center, 1160 Dickinson Street. No meeting in July.

Sector I: Sixteen Acres The Beat Management Team for Sector I rotates meeting locations and day of month. Each meeting will have information about the entire sector.

Meetings are on the first Tuesday in February, April, June, August, October, and December at Allen Park Apartments Community Room, 251 Allen Park Road. These meetings start at 6:15pm. Walter Gould is the Chairperson.

Meetings are held on the third Tuesday in January, March, May, July, September and November at the Clodo Conception Community Center on Parker Street behind the library (the former Greenleaf Community Center). These meetings start at 6pm. The Chairperson is Sally Lussier.

== See also ==
- C3 policing, a modified counter-insurgency ("COIN") method adapted for use by civilian law enforcement agencies under the Springfield Police Department's development
