= Paul Tucker (politician) =

American politician

District Attorney of Essex County
- Incumbent
- Assumed office January 2, 2023
- Preceded by: Jonathan W. Blodgett

Member of the Massachusetts House of Representatives from the 7th Essex district
- In office January 7, 2015 – January 4, 2023
- Preceded by: John D. Keenan
- Succeeded by: Manny Cruz

Chief of the Salem Police Department
- In office 2009–2014
- Preceded by: Robert M. St. Pierre
- Succeeded by: Mary E. Butler

Personal details
- Party: Democratic
- Education: Salem State University (BS); Anna Maria College (MA); Massachusetts School of Law (JD)

Paul F. Tucker is an American politician, lawyer and law enforcement officer currently serving as the District Attorney of Essex County, Massachusetts since 2023. A member of the Democratic Party, Tucker served as the State Representative for Massachusetts House of Representatives' 7th Essex district from 2014 to 2022.

Tucker formerly served as Chief of the Salem Police Department before being elected to public office.

== Early life, education, and career ==
Tucker graduated from Salem High School in 1976, where he played basketball. Tucker went on to graduate from Salem State University with a bachelor's degree in Criminal Justice. Tucker worked as a campus police officer until later joining the Nashua, New Hampshire Police Department. In 1983, Tucker joined the Salem Police Department as a patrol officer.

While working at the Salem Police Department, Tucker earned a master's degree in Criminal Justice from Anna Maria College in 1992. Tucker held multiple positions in the Salem Police Department, including detective, chief of detectives, and Chief of Police. Tucker also attended the FBI National Academy, Federal Law Enforcement Training Center, and directed the North Shore Drug Task Force.

Tucker attended night classes at the Massachusetts School of Law, earning a juris doctor in 2000. Tucker has since taught Criminal Justice courses at Endicott College and Salem State University.

In 2014, Tucker resigned as Chief of the Salem Police Department, and was elected as the State Representative for the Massachusetts House of Representatives' 7th Essex district, covering the city of Salem. In 2022, Tucker was elected as the District Attorney of Essex County, and has held this office since January 2, 2023.

== Controversy Concerning Tucker's Handling of Police Brutality Allegation ==
Tucker has been at the center of a controversy involving his failure to bring charges against a police officer in a case of alleged police brutality.

According to video and records obtained by NBC Boston, a Lawrence, Massachusetts man, Sodiq Folarin Amusat, was arrested and held in custody by the Lawrence Police Department in March 2023.

In the early morning hours of March 10, 2023, Amusat stood inside the Lawrence Police Department booking room after officers had arrested him for disorderly conduct related to a noise complaint. While Amusat was speaking with officers in the booking area, Mark Mangan, a police Captain at the time, suddenely struck Mangan with his arm. Amusat's head struck a metal door and he then fell to the floor. In reference to Mangan's striking of Amusat, NBC stated: "Mangan suddenly 'clotheslined' him." Mangan violently struck Amusat with an outstretched arm. Video of the incident depicted what appeared to be an unprovoked attack.

While Tucker, as Essex County District Attorney, declined to pursue criminal charges against Mangan, The Boston Globe reported in August 2025 that a federal grand jury probe of the incident was underway. In October 2025, that federal grand jury indicted Mangan on charges including deprivation of rights under color of law and submitting false reports. It also reported that Amusat filed a lawsuit against Mangan and the City of Lawrence. That lawsuit was stayed by the court, apparently due to the criminal probe.

== Massachusetts House of Representatives ==
Tucker was first elected to serve as the State Representative for Massachusetts House of Representatives' 7th Essex district, which encompasses the city of Salem, Massachusetts, on November 4, 2014, as a member of the Democratic Party. Tucker defeated Libertarian party candidate Daniel Morris with 84% of the vote in the general election. Tucker was then re-elected essentially unopposed in both primary and general elections in 2016, 2018, and 2020.

While a State Representative, Tucker served as Vice Chair of the Joint Committee on Marijuana Policy. Tucker also sat on numerous committees, including the Joint Committee on Education, on the Judiciary, on Public Safety and Homeland Security, on Ways and Means, on Education, on Transportation, on Municipalities and Regional Government, and on Mental Health, Substance Use and Recovery.

== See also ==
- 2019–2020 Massachusetts legislature
- 2021–2022 Massachusetts legislature
