= Massachusetts School of Law =

Law School in Massachusetts, USA

Coordinates: 42°45′35.53″N 71°08′50.86″W

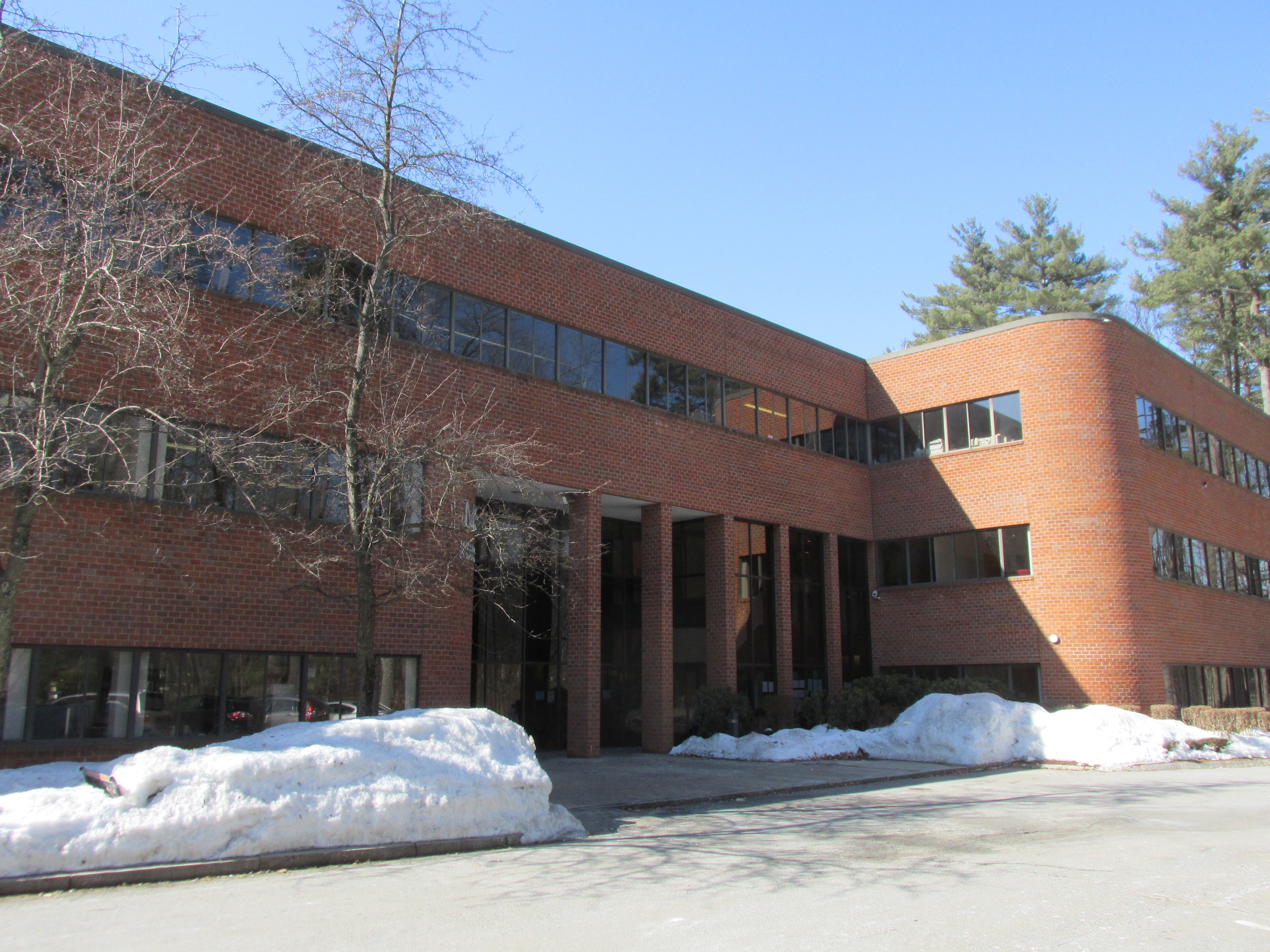
- Established: 1988
- School type: Private law school
- Dean: Michael L. Coyne
- Location: Andover, Massachusetts, US
- Enrollment: 295 (2022)
- Faculty: 14 (Full time)
- USNWR ranking: Unranked
- Bar pass rate: 40% (July 2026 first time Massachusetts bar takers)
- Website: mslaw.edu

The Massachusetts School of Law (MSLAW) is a private law school in Andover, Massachusetts. It was founded in 1988 and claims that its design and curriculum were influenced by the medical school educational model and legal scholars. Although it is accredited by the New England Commission of Higher Education, it is not accredited by the American Bar Association (ABA).

The MSLAW bar passage rate for July 2026 first-time Massachusetts bar takers was 40% (12 of 42 students passed). For MSLAW July 2026 Total Examinees, 17 out of 62 students passed the Massachusetts bar for a 27.42% pass rate.

Unlike law schools accredited by the ABA, MSLAW does not report employment outcomes for its graduates. MSLAW also does not consider LSAT scores in its admission process.

== Accreditation ==
The Massachusetts School of Law is accredited by the New England Commission of Higher Education. It is currently unaccredited by the American Bar Association.

In 1990, the Massachusetts Board of Regents of Higher Education authorized MSLAW to grant the Juris Doctor degree. MSLAW subsequently applied for American Bar Association approval while filing an action in Federal Court in Philadelphia challenging some of the ABA's accreditation standards, arguing that those standards are of questionable educational value, violate antitrust laws, and needlessly increase tuition costs. MSLAW refused to comply with these standards, and the ABA refused to approve the school. As a result of its actions the MSLAW and the Department of Justice filed complaints against the ABA for antitrust violations. The summary judgment dismissing the MSLAW complaint on immunity grounds was granted to the ABA at the trial level and affirmed by the United States Court of Appeals for the Third Circuit. The case brought by DOJ was later settled by way of a consent decree between the ABA and the United States Department of Justice in which the ABA agreed to modify its accreditation process and eliminate some of its law school accreditation standards that violated antitrust laws and were outdated. The school continues to criticize ABA standards that it fails to meet, and encourage the Department of Education to strip the ABA of its authority over other law schools.

== Admission and academics ==
Students at Massachusetts School of Law learn to practice law through classroom instruction, simulated client experiences, and numerous live client experiences. MSLAW does not require the LSAT for admission. However, MSLAW administers its own examination (MSLAT) similar to the LSAT, requires letters of recommendation, and interviews every applicant for admission.

== Massachusetts Bar Examination Passage ==
The results for the July 2026 Massachusetts Bar Examination by MSLAW students are, as follows:
First Time Takers = 30, passed = 12, percent = 40.00%
Second Time Takers = 5, passed = 1, percent = 20.00%
Third Time Takers = 7, passed = 3, percent = 42.86%
Fourth Time or More = 20, passed = 1, percent = 5.00%
Total Examinees = 62, passed = 17, percent = 27.42%

== Post-graduation employment prospects ==
Unlike ABA-accredited law schools, MSLAW does not publish employment statistics for its graduates.

When asked about the employment outcomes of MSLAW graduates in 2012, Dean Lawrence Velvel said, "I have no idea. We have never collected statistics on any of that, so we don't have any notion."

== Costs ==
Tuition for full-time students at MSLAW for the 2022–2023 academic year is $25,950.

== American College of History & Legal Studies ==
The American College of History & Legal Studies (ACHLS) was a completion college in Salem, New Hampshire, which operated from 2010 to 2015.

Administrators at the Massachusetts School of Law were inspired to start the college due to concerns about students entering the law school with poor writing skills and American history knowledge. The goal was for the undergraduate college to serve as a feeder school for the law school. It received state accreditation by a unanimous vote of the New Hampshire Senate.

Billed as a "fast track to law school," ACHLS offered students transferring in from other institutions a program that combined the final two years of their B.A. with a J.D. Articulation agreements were signed with nearby New Hampshire Technical Institute and Mount Wachusett Community College to help students transfer to ACHLS. After finishing their junior year at ACHLS, students could begin their first year at the Massachusetts School of Law.

Designed to be low-cost, the college's tuition was $10,000 USD for the 2010–2011 academic year, and was eliminated in 2011 for students who completed their junior year and enrolled early at the law school at regular cost. Students who chose not to enroll at the law school were billed for their senior year at ACHLS.

ACHLS closed after graduating three small classes. Its alumni include at least one elected official.

== Notable alumni ==
- Steven A. Baddour (1996) – former Massachusetts State Senator (2002–2012)
- Kim Driscoll – 73rd Lt. Governor of Massachusetts and 50th Mayor of Salem, Massachusetts
- William M. Gannon – New Hampshire State Senator (2016–present), New Hampshire State Representative (2014–2016)
- Barry Finegold – Massachusetts State Senator
- Eugene L. O'Flaherty – former Massachusetts State Representative (1996–2013), former corporation counsel for the City of Boston
- Paul Tucker – district attorney of Essex County, Massachusetts, former Massachusetts State Representative (2014–2022), former chief of the Salem Police Department
