= List of law enforcement agencies in Massachusetts =

This is a list of law enforcement agencies in the Commonwealth of Massachusetts.

According to the US Bureau of Justice Statistics' 2018 Census of State and Local Law Enforcement Agencies (CSLLEA), the state had 374 law enforcement agencies employing 19,578 (sworn) personnel (27,489 personnel, total, including sworn and non-sworn positions), with an average of 284 sworn personnel per 100,000 residents (compared to the national average of 241 sworn personnel per 100,000 residents, with Massachusetts maintaining approximately 16% more sworn personnel per 100,000 residents than the national average).

Between the previous CSLLEA (in 2008) and the 2018 CSLLEA, Massachusetts saw an increase of 357 law enforcement agencies to 374 (an increase of 17 agencies or 4.6%). Sworn personnel would increase from 18,342 to 19,578 (an increase of 1,236 or 6.5%). Sworn personnel would increase from 280 per 100,000 state residents to 284 per 100,000 residents (an increase of 4 per 100,000 or 1.4%).

As of 2022, Massachusetts ranked 26th out of 50 in violent crime rates, ranked ranked 5th-lowest (45th out of 50) in homicide rates, and was the ranked second-lowest (48th out of 50) in property crime rates as of 2019.

== State agencies ==
- Alcoholic Beverages Control Commission Enforcement Division (certain investigators may be sworn as "special state police officers" (SSPOs))
- Division of Police Standards, Massachusetts Peace Officer Standards and Training Commission (MPOST-C)
- Massachusetts Environmental Police
- Massachusetts State Police
- Massachusetts Parole Board
- Massachusetts Department of Correction
- Massachusetts Probation Service
- Trial Court Security Department

Alcoholic Beverages Control Commission Enforcement Division special investigators, Massachusetts Department of Correction officers, Massachusetts Parole Board officers, Massachusetts Probation Service officers, and Massachusetts Trial Court Security Department officers are not subject to the MPOST-C's regulations nor certification process. This restricts their ability to act as law enforcement officers in all but very specific circumstances.

== County agencies ==
- Barnstable County Sheriff's Office
- Berkshire County Sheriff's Office
- Bristol County Sheriff's Office
- Dukes County Sheriff's Office
- Essex County Sheriff's Office
- Franklin County Sheriff's Office
- Hampden County Sheriff's Office
- Hampshire County Sheriff's Office
- Middlesex County Sheriff's Office
- Nantucket County Sheriff's Office
- Norfolk County Sheriff's Office
- Plymouth County Sheriff's Office
- Suffolk County Sheriff's Department
- Worcester County Sheriff's Office

County sheriff's angencies are not automatically subject to the MPOST-C's regulations nor certification process. This restricts their ability to act as law enforcement officers in all but very specific circumstances. Sheriff's personnel that meet the MPOST-C standards and are certified, however, are considered "law enforcement officers" under Massachusetts law and are not subject to the same restrictions.

== Municipal agencies ==
- Abington Police Department
- Acton Police Department
- Acushnet Police Department
- Adams Police Department
- Agawam Police Department
- Alford Police Department
- Andover Police Department
- Amesbury Police Department
- Amherst Police Department
- Arlington Police Department
- Ashburnham Police Department
- Ashby Police Department
- Ashfield Police Department
- Ashland Police Department
- Aquinnah Police Department
- Athol Police Department
- Attleboro Police Department
- Auburn Police Department
- Avon Police Department
- Ayer Police Department
- Barnstable Police Department
- Barre Police Department
- Becket Police Department
- Bedford Police Department
- Belchertown Police Department
- Bellingham Police Department
- Belmont Police Department
- Berkley Police Department
- Berlin Police Department
- Bernardston Police Department
- Beverly Police Department
- Billerica Police Department
- Blackstone Police Department
- Bolton Police Department
- Boston Police Department
- Bourne Police Department
- Boxborough Police Department
- Boxford Police Department
- Boylston Police Department
- Braintree Police Department
- Brewster Police Department
- Bridgewater Police Department
- Brimfield Police Department
- Brockton Police Department
- Brookfield Police Department
- Brookline Police Department
- Buckland Police Department
- Burlington Police Department
- Cambridge Police Department
- Canton Police Department
- Carlisle Police Department
- Carver Police Department
- Charlemont Police Department
- Charlton Police Department
- Chatham Police Department
- Chelmsford Police Department
- Chelsea Police Department
- Cheshire Police Department
- Chester-Blandford Police Department (the second dual-town agency created in Massachusetts — after the Hardwick-New Braintree Police Department — the Chester Police Department began providing law enforcement services to Blandford in July 2018 and was renamed to the "Chester-Blandford Police Department" in December 2019)
- Chesterfield Police Department
- Chicopee Police Department
- Chilmark Police Department
- Clarksburg Police Department
- Clinton Police Department
- Cohasset Police Department
- Colrain Police Department
- Concord Police Department
- Conway Police Department
- Cummington Police Department
- Dalton Police Department
- Danvers Police Department
- Dartmouth Police Department
- Dedham Police Department
- Deerfield Police Department
- Dennis Police Department
- Dighton Police Department
- Douglas Police Department
- Dover Police Department
- Dracut Police Department
- Dudley Police Department
- Dunstable Police Department
- Duxbury Police Department
- East Bridgewater Police Department
- East Brookfield Police Department
- East Longmeadow Police Department
- Eastham Police Department
- Easthampton Police Department
- Easton Police Department
- Edgartown Police Department
- Egremont Police Department
- Erving Police Department
- Essex Police Department
- Everett Police Department
- Fairhaven Police Department
- Fall River Police Department
- Falmouth Police Department
- Fitchburg Police Department
- Foxborough Police Department
- Framingham Police Department
- Franklin Police Department
- Freetown Police Department
- Gardner Police Department
- Georgetown Police Department
- Gill Police Department
- Gloucester Police Department
- Goshen Police Department
- Gosnold Police Department
- Grafton Police Department
- Granby Police Department
- Granville Police Department
- Great Barrington Police Department
- Greenfield Police Department
- Groton Police Department
- Hadley Police Department
- Halifax Police Department
- Hamilton Police Department
- Hampden Police Department
- Hancock Police Department
- Hanover Police Department
- Hanson Police Department
- Hardwick-New Braintree Police Department (the first dual-town agency created in Massachusetts, the Hardwick Police Department began providing law enforcement services to New Braintree in July 2014 and was shortly thereafter renamed to the "Hardwick-New Braintree Police Department")
- Harvard Police Department
- Harwich Police Department
- Hatfield Police Department
- Haverhill Police Department
- Hawley Police Department
- Heath Police Department
- Hingham Police Department
- Hinsdale Police Department
- Holbrook Police Department
- Holden Police Department
- Holland Police Department
- Holliston Police Department
- Holyoke Police Department
- Hopedale Police Department
- Hopkinton Police Department
- Hubbardston Police Department
- Hudson Police Department
- Hull Police Department
- Huntington Police Department
- Ipswich Police Department
- Kingston Police Department
- Lancaster Police Department
- Lanesborough Police Department
- Lakeville Police Department
- Lawrence Police Department
- Lee Police Department
- Leicester Police Department
- Lenox Police Department
- Leominster Police Department
- Leverett Police Department
- Lexington Police Department
- Leyden Police Department
- Lincoln Police Department
- Littleton Police Department
- Longmeadow Police Department
- Lowell Police Department
- Ludlow Police Department
- Lunnenburg Police Department
- Lynn Police Department
- Lynnfield Police Department
- Malden Police Department
- Manchester-by-the-Sea Police Department
- Mansfield Police Department
- Marion Police Department
- Marblehead Police Department
- Marlborough Police Department
- Marshfield Police Department
- Mashpee Police Department
- Mattapoisett Police Department
- Maynard Police Department
- Medfield Police Department
- Medford Police Department
- Medway Police Department
- Melrose Police Department
- Mendon Police Department
- Merrimac Police Department
- Methuen Police Department
- Middleborough Police Department
- Middlefield Police Department
- Middleton Police Department
- Milford Police Department
- Millbury Police Department
- Millis Police Department
- Milleville Police Department
- Milton Police Department
- Monson Police Department
- Montague Police Department
- Monterey Police Department
- Nahant Police Department
- Nantucket Police Department
- Natick Police Department
- Needham Police Department
- New Bedford Police Department
- New Marlborough Police Department
- New Salem Police Department
- Newbury Police Department
- Newburyport Police Department
- Newton Police Department
- Norfolk Police Department
- North Adams Police Department
- North Andover Police Department
- North Attleborough Police Department
- North Brookfield Police Department
- North Reading Police Department
- Northampton Police Department
- Northborough Police Department
- Northbridge Police Department
- Northfield Police Department
- Norton Police Department
- Norwell Police Department
- Norwood Police Department
- Oak Bluffs Police Department
- Oakham Police Department
- Orange Police Department
- Orleans Police Department
- Otis Police Department
- Oxford Police Department
- Palmer Police Department
- Paxton Police Department
- Peabody Police Department
- Pepperell Police Department
- Pelham Police Department
- Pembroke Police Department
- Peru Police Department
- Petersham Police Department
- Phillipston Police Department
- Pittsfield Police Department
- Plainfield Police Department
- Plainville Police Department
- Plymouth Police Department
- Plympton Police Department
- Princeton Police Department
- Provincetown Police Department
- Quincy Police Department
- Raynham Police Department
- Randolph Police Department
- Reading Police Department
- Rehoboth Police Department
- Revere Police Department
- Richmond Police Department
- Rochester Police Department
- Rockland Police Department
- Rockport Police Department
- Rowe Police Department
- Rowley Police Department
- Royalston Police Department
- Russell-Montgomery Police Department (the third dual-town agency created in Massachusetts — after the Hardwick-New Braintree and Chester-Blandford police departments — the Russell Police Department began offering law enforcement services to Montgomery in July 2022 and was shortly thereafter renamed to the "Russell-Montgomery Police Department")
- Rutland Police Department
- Salem Police Department
- Salisbury Police Department
- Sandisfield Police Department
- Sandwich Police Department
- Saugus Police Department
- Savoy Police Department
- Scituate Police Department
- Seekonk Police Department
- Sharon Police Department
- Sheffield Police Department
- Shelburne Police Department
- Sherborne Police Department
- Shirley Police Department
- Shrewsbury Police Department
- Shutesbury Police Department
- Somerset Police Department
- Somerville Police Department
- South Hadley Police Department
- Southborough Police Department
- Southbridge Police Department
- Southampton Police Department
- Southwick Police Department
- Spencer Police Department
- Springfield Police Department
- Sterling Police Department
- Stockbridge Police Department
- Stoneham Police Department
- Stoughton Police Department
- Stow Police Department
- Sturbridge Police Department
- Sudbury Police Department
- Sutton Police Department
- Swansea Police Department
- Swampscott Police Department
- Taunton Police Department
- Templeton Police Department
- Tewksbury Police Department
- Tisbury Police Department
- Tolland Police Department
- Topsfield Police Department
- Townsend Police Department
- Truro Police Department
- Tynsborough Police Department
- Tyringham Police Department
- Upton Police Department
- Uxbridge Police Department
- Wakefield Police Department
- Wales Police Department
- Walpole Police Department
- Waltham Police Department
- Ware Police Department
- Wareham Police Department
- Warren Police Department
- Warwick Police Department
- Washington Police Department
- Watertown Police Department
- Wayland Police Department
- Webster Police Department
- Wellesley Police Department
- Wellfleet Police Department
- Wendell Police Department
- Wenham Police Department
- West Boylston Police Department
- West Bridgewater Police Department
- West Brookfield Police Department
- West Newbury Police Department
- West Springfield Police Department
- West Stockbridge Police Department
- West Tisbury Police Department
- Westborough Police Department
- Westhampton Police Department
- Westfield Police Department
- Westford Police Department
- Westminster Police Department
- Westport Police Department
- Weston Police Department
- Westwood Police Department
- Weymouth Police Department
- Whately Police Department
- Whitman Police Department
- Wilbraham Police Department
- Williamsburg Police Department
- Williamstown Police Department
- Wilmington Police Department
- Winchendon Police Department
- Winchester Police Department
- Windsor Police Department
- Winthrop Police Department
- Woburn Police Department
- Worcester Police Department
- Worthington Police Department
- Wrentham Police Department
- Yarmouth Police Department

== Other agencies ==
- Animal Rescue League of Boston Law Enforcement Department
- Baystate Medical Center Security
- Boston Housing Authority Police Division
- Boston Medical Center Public Safety
- Beth Israel Deaconess Medical Center Public Safety Department
- Boston Medical Center Public Safety Department
- Boston Public Health Commission Police
- Brigham and Women's Faulkner Hospital
- Brigham and Women's Hospital Police and Security Department
- Cambridge Health Alliance Department of Public Safety
- Mashpee Wampanoag Police Department
- Mass General Brigham Salem Public Safety Department
- Massachusetts Bay Transportation Authority Police
- Massachusetts General Hospital Police, Security and Outside Services Department (certain personnel are MPOST-C certified SSPOs; the department also employs non-sworn personnel)
- Massachusetts Port Authority Police
- Massachusetts Society for the Prevention of Cruelty to Animals Law Enforcement
- Newton-Wellesley Hospital Parking and Public Safety Department
- Saint Elizabeth’s Medical Center Safety and Security Department
- Saint Vincent Hospital Police Department
- Somerville Housing Authority Police Department
- Tufts Medical Center Public Safety
- UMass Memorial Medical Center Police

== College and university agencies ==
- American International College Police Department
- Amherst College Police Department
- Assumption College Department of Public Safety
- Babson College Department of Public Safety
- Bay Path University Department of Campus Public Safety
- Becker College Police Department
- Bentley University Police Department
- Berklee Public Safety Department
- Boston College Police Department
- Boston University Police Department
- Brandeis University Police Department
- Bridgewater State University Police Department
- Bristol Community College Police Department
- Bunker Hill Community College Police Department
- Cape Cod Community College Police Department
- Clark University Police Department
- Curry College Department of Public Safety
- College of the Holy Cross Public Safety
- Emerson College Police Department
- Fisher College Police Department
- Fitchburg State University Police Department
- Framingham State University Police Department
- Greenfield Community College Office of Public Safety
- Harvard University Police Department
- Holyoke Community College Police Department
- Lasell College Police Department
- Massachusetts Bay Community College Campus Police Department
- Massachusetts College of Art & Design Police Department
- Massachusetts College of Liberal Arts Department of Public Safety
- Massachusetts Institute of Technology Police Department
- Massachusetts Maritime Academy Police Department
- Massasoit Community College Police Department
- Massachusetts College of Pharmacy and Health Services Public Safety Department
- Merrimack College Police Department
- Middlesex County College Police Department
- Mount Holyoke College Campus Police Department
- Mount Wachusett Community College Campus Police Department
- Northeastern University Police Department
- North Shore Community College Campus Police Department
- Quinsigamond Community College Police Department
- Salem State University Police Department
- Simmons University Police Department
- Smith College Campus Police Department
- Springfield College Department of Public Safety
- Springfield Technical Community College Police Department
- Stonehill College Police Department
- Suffolk University Police and Security Department
- Tufts University Police Department
- University of Massachusetts Amherst Police Department
- University of Massachusetts Boston Police Department
- University of Massachusetts Dartmouth Police Department
- University of Massachusetts Lowell Police Department
- University of Massachusetts Chan Medical School Police Department
- Wellesley College Campus Police Department
- Wentworth Institute of Technology Public Safety Department
- Western New England University Department of Public Safety
- Westfield State University Police Department
- Wheaton College Public Safety Department
- Worcester Polytechnic Institute Police Department
- Worcester State University Police Department

== Federal Agencies ==
These are federal agencies that have common operations within the commonwealth.

- Administrative Office of the United States Courts, Office of Probation and Pretrial Services
- Amtrak Police Department
- Bureau of Alcohol, Tobacco, Firearms and Explosives
- Bureau of Industry and Security, Office of Export Enforcement
- Department of the Air Force Police
- Department of the Navy Police
- Defense Criminal Investigative Service
- Drug Enforcement Administration
- Federal Air Marshal Service
- Federal Bureau of Investigation
- Federal Bureau of Prisons
- Federal Protective Service
- Internal Revenue Service, Criminal Investigations Division
- National Aeronautics and Space Administration, Protective Services
- National Oceanic and Atmospheric Administration Office of Law Enforcement
- National Park Service Law Enforcement Rangers
- National Nuclear and Security Administration, Office of Secure Transport
- United States Air Force Office of Special Investigations
- United States Air Force Security Forces
- United States Army Military Police
- United States Coast Guard
- United States Customs and Border Protection
- United States Department of Veterans Affairs Police
- United States Diplomatic Security Service
- United States Environmental Protection Agency Criminal Investigation Division
- United States Food and Drug Administration Office of Criminal Investigations
- United States Immigration and Customs Enforcement
- United States Marine Corps Criminal Investigation Division
- United States Marine Corps Military Police
- United States Marine Corps Police
- United States Marshal Service
- United States Naval Criminal Investigative Service
- United States Navy Master-at-Arms
- United States Postal Inspection Service

== See also ==
- List of defunct law enforcement agencies of Massachusetts
