= Methuen Police Department =

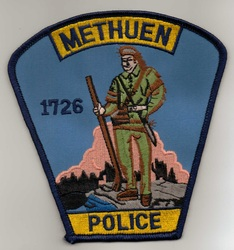
- Abbreviation: MPD

Agency overview
- Annual budget: 7.781 Million

Jurisdictional structure
- Operations jurisdiction: Massachusetts, USA
- Legal jurisdiction: City of Methuen, Massachusetts
- General nature: Local civilian police

Operational structure
- Headquarters: Quinn Building, 90 Hampshire St, Methuen, Massachusetts
- Police Officers: 95
- Civilians: 16
- Agency executive: Scott J. McNamara, Chief of Police

Website
- City of Methuen Police Department

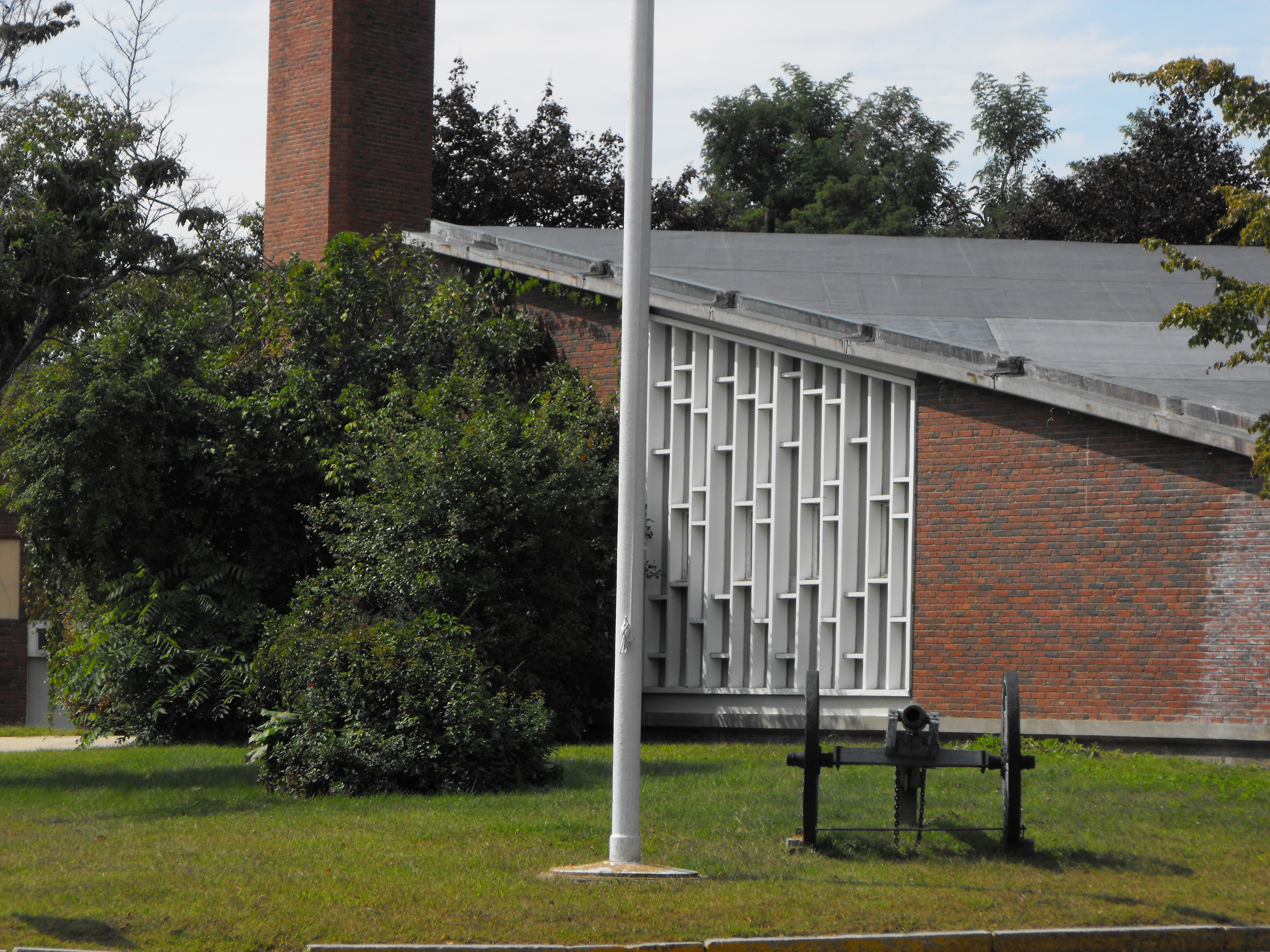
The Quinn Safety Building

The Methuen Police Department (MPD) has the primary responsibility for law enforcement and investigation within the city of Methuen, Massachusetts.

== Rank structure ==
- Chief of Police
- Deputy Chief - The rank of Deputy Chief was eliminated on March 1, 2008, with the retirement of Deputy Police Chief Joseph Alaimo.
- Captains
- Lieutenants
- Sergeants
- Patrolmen

== Police Chiefs ==
- Cyril Feugill about 1958?
- Christopher H. Devine
- Francis J Morse 1972 to 1985 Retired June 1985 Died: February 7, 1986
- Donald DeSantis Appointed: July 1, 1985, retired: April 1, 1995 Died: June 5, 2007
- Bruce A. MacDougall (Methuen Police 1975 — 2002 (27 years)) Appointed Chief:1995 Retired:2002
- Joseph E. Solomon Appointed:2002 Removed: May 7, 2008 Reinstated: Oct 1, 2010

== Layoffs in 2019 ==
On January 24, 2019, the department started laying off 50 officers (more than half, since there were 95 to begin with) because of a contract dispute. If the pay raises in question had gone into effect, Methuen would have overspent its budget, which is illegal in Massachusetts. This led to an investigation by the Inspector General of Massachusetts who concluded that approving the 2017 contract “likely violated state and municipal laws ... and failed to comply with their own municipal rules and breached their fiduciary duties to the residents of Methuen.”

== See also ==
- List of law enforcement agencies in Massachusetts
