= Manny Cruz =

Member of the Massachusetts House of Representatives

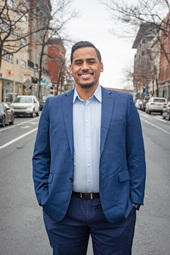

Member of the Massachusetts House of Representatives for 7th Essex District
- Incumbent
- Assumed office January 4, 2023

Personal details
- Born: 1993 or 1994 (age 32–33)
- Party: Democratic
- Education: Northeastern University

Manny Cruz (born 1993/1994) is a current member of the Massachusetts House of Representatives for the 7th Essex District.

== Career ==
Starting in 2017, Cruz worked as a Legislative Aide to State Representative Juana Matias. He was also elected as a member of the Salem School Committee in the same year. He was also a part of Paul F. Tucker's office. He was elected as the Representative for the 7th Essex District of the Massachusetts House of Representatives in 2022.

== Personal life ==
Cruz married Vanessa Cruz in 2019. The couple have one daughter.
