= John D. Keenan =

American politician

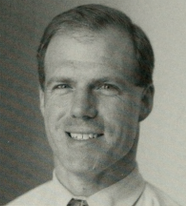
- Portrait of John D. Keenan

14th President of Salem State University
- Incumbent
- Assumed office August 6, 2017
- Preceded by: Patricia Maguire Meservey

Member of the Massachusetts House of Representatives from the 7th Essex district
- In office 2005 – August 23, 2014
- Preceded by: J. Michael Ruane
- Succeeded by: Paul Tucker

Personal details
- Born: April 4, 1965 (age 61) Salem, Massachusetts
- Party: Democratic
- Education: Harvard College; Suffolk University Law School

John D. Keenan (born April 4, 1965) is an American attorney and politician who has served as the president of Salem State University since 2017. He was the Massachusetts State Representative for the 7th Essex district, which consists of his hometown of Salem, from 2005 to 2014. He is a Democrat. Prior to serving in the Massachusetts legislature, he was assistant district attorney of Essex County and city solicitor of Salem.

Representative Keenan was from 2011 to 2014 the House Chair of Joint Committee on Telecommunications, Utilities and Energy. He resigned from the legislature August 23, 2014, and became vice president for administration at Salem State on August 25. He was promoted to president in 2017.
