= Metropolitan Law Enforcement Council =

The Metropolitan Law Enforcement Council sometimes called "MetroLEC," is a regional mutual aid facilitator formed by 45 police agencies in the area near Boston, Massachusetts. It pools resources to provide SWAT, canine, hostage negotiation, computer crimes, motorcycle and other units throughout the area. Its fleet includes at least one armored car and a mobile command post. Press reports indicated that in 2016 it used its SWAT unit twenty-six times. MetroLEC, like other such agencies such as the North Eastern Massachusetts Law Enforcement Council, claims it is a private organization and exempt from open records laws.

The group was established sometime before 2004. Richard Stillman, the Walpole chief of police served as the group's president for ten years. By 2017, Canton Police Chief Ken Berkowitz was the group's leader. In 2020, the chief of the Norton Police Department was serving as president of the group.

Agencies that belong to MetroLEC include:

- Abington Police Department
- Attleboro Police Department
- Avon Police Department
- Bellingham Police Department
- Braintree Police Department
- Canton Police Department
- Cohasset Police Department
- Dedham Police Department
- Dover Police Department
- Duxbury Police Department
- Easton Police Department
- Foxborough Police Department
- Franklin Police Department
- Hanover Police Department
- Hingham Police Department
- Holbrook Police Department
- Mansfield Police Department
- Medfield Police Department
- Medway Police Department
- Millis Police Department
- Milton Police Department
- Natick Police Department
- Needham Police Department
- Norfolk Police Department
- Norton Police Department
- Norwell Police Department
- Norwood Police Department
- Pembroke Police Department
- Plainville Police Department
- Randolph Police Department
- Rockland Police Department
- Sharon Police Department
- Stoughton Police Department
- Sudbury Police Department
- Walpole Police Department
- Wayland Police Department
- Wellesley Police Department
- Weston Police Department
- Westwood Police Department
- Weymouth Police Department
- Wrentham Police Department
- Bristol County Sheriff's Office
- Norfolk County Sheriff's Office
- Plymouth County Sheriff's Office
- Fallon Ambulance Service Tactical Paramedic Unit
