= North Eastern Massachusetts Law Enforcement Council =

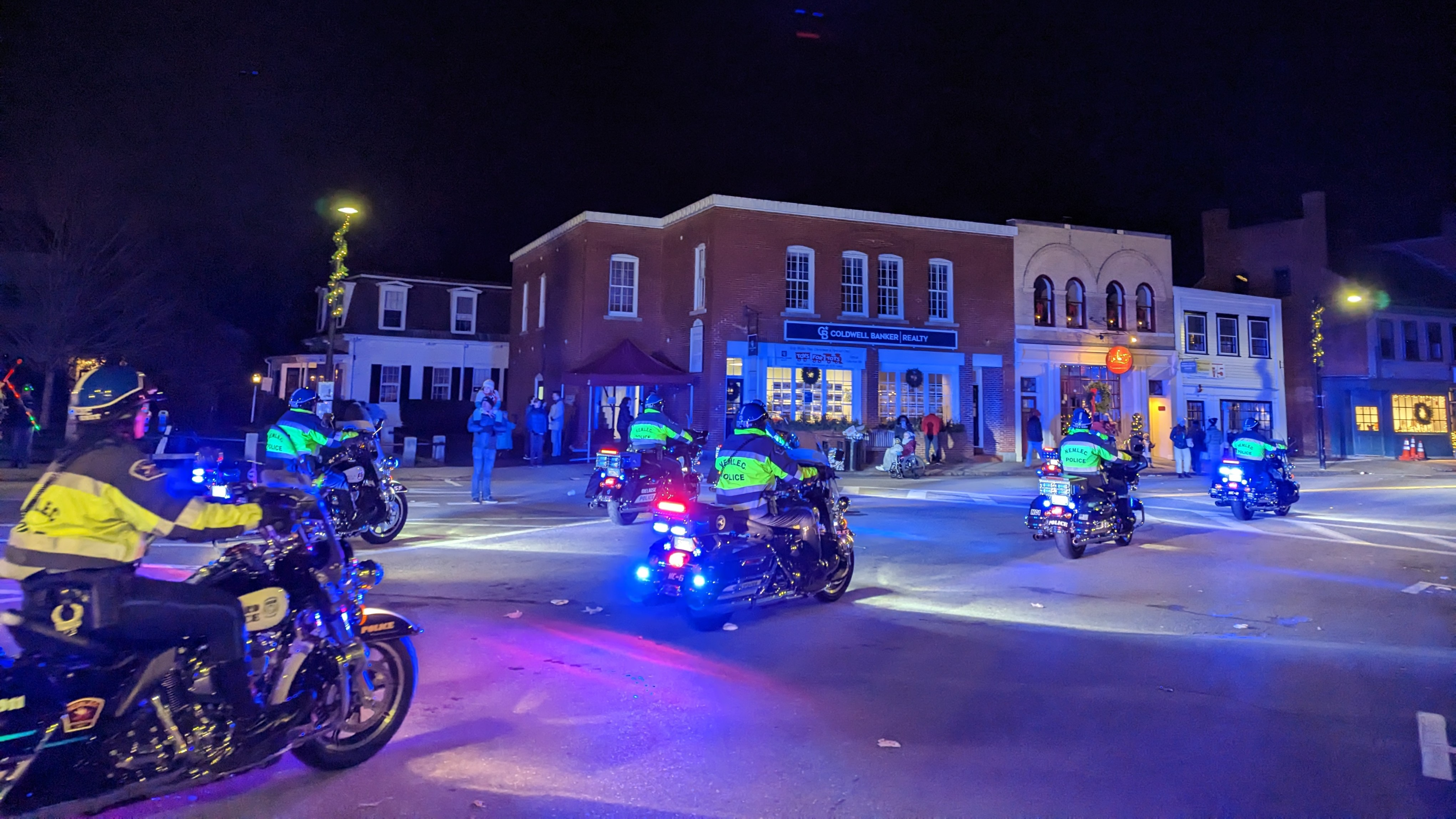
NEMLEC officers on motorcycles clear streets of pedestrians at the conclusion of the annual tree lighting ceremony in Concord, Massachusetts, in 2022

The Northeastern Massachusetts Law Enforcement Council or "NEMLEC" is a non-profit consortium made up of 63 police departments in Middlesex, Essex and Suffolk County and 2 County Sheriff's Departments. Member agencies participate by sharing resources and personnel, allowing member agencies to provide supplemental services to citizens in the 925 square miles they serve. NEMLEC coordinates the mutual aid between agencies in accordance with M.G.L. Section 40, Paragraph 8G and 4J. The organization is headquartered at 314 Main Street, Suite 205 in Wilmington, Massachusetts. In 2014 its president was Michael Begonis, the chief of the Wilmington Police Department. By the next year, press reports indicated the president was John Fisher, chief of the Carlisle Police Department.

Specialized services offered by NEMLEC include:

- RRT/SWAT - Regional Response Team and SWAT Team (which includes a Crisis Negotiation Team) and K-9 Unit trained in search & rescue.
- Motor Unit - Provides escorts, traffic safety and crowd control
- CISM Team - Critical Incident Stress Management Team
- STARS - The School Threat Assessment and Response Team is made up of police officers and licensed clinicians who respond to critical incidents at schools as well as provide threat assessments to member districts
- IMT - The Incident Management Team provides support to all NEMLEC units in terms of communications and coordinates same and operational plans for large scale events

As a private corporation, NEMLEC claimed in 2014 that it was able to keep its internal organization and operations out of the public's view. It would not respond to open records requests. Other such organizations in the state, such as the Metropolitan Law Enforcement Council, claimed the same. As a result of a lawsuit by the local branch of the American Civil Liberties Union, in 2015 it changed policy and released documents requested by the public. Days later the Washington Post published an article based on the documents describing an "excessive" use of SWAT teams for routine police matters.

Agencies that belong to NEMLEC include:

- Amesbury Police Department
- Andover Police Department
- Arlington Police Department
- Ayer Police Department
- Bedford Police Department
- Belmont Police Department
- Beverly Police Department
- Billerica Police Department
- Burlington Police Department
- Carlisle Police Department
- Chelmsford Police Department
- Concord Police Department
- Danvers Police Department
- Dracut Police Department
- Dunstable Police Department
- Essex County Sheriff's Department
- Georgetown Police Department
- Gloucester Police Department
- Groton Police Department
- Haverhill Police Department
- Ipswich Police Depaetment
- Lawrence Police Department
- Lexington Police Department
- Lincoln Police Department
- Littleton Police Department
- Lowell Police Department
- Lynnfield Police Department
- Malden Police Department
- Marblehead Police Department
- Maynard Police Department
- Medford Police Department
- Melrose Police Department
- Methuen Police Department
- Middlesex County Sheriff's Office
- Merrimac Police Department
- Newbury Police Department
- Newburyport Police Department
- Newton Police Department
- North Andover Police Department
- North Reading Police Department
- Peabody Police Department
- Pepperell Police Department
- Reading Police Department
- Rowley Police Department
- Salem Police Department
- Saugus Police Department
- Somerville Police Department
- Stoneham Police Department
- Sudbury Police Department
- Tewksbury Police Department
- Townsend Police Department
- Tyngsborough Police Department
- Wakefield Police Department
- Waltham Police Department
- Watertown Police Department
- Wenham Police Department
- Westford Police Department
- Weston Police Department
- Wilmington Police Department
- Winchester Police Department
- Winthrop Police Department
- Woburn Police Department
