= Lowell Police Department =

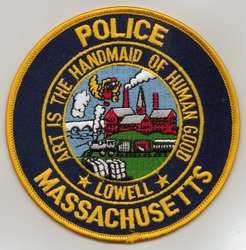
- Police Department patch
- Common name: Lowell P.D.
- Abbreviation: LPD

Agency overview
- Formed: 1830; 196 years ago
- Employees: 320
- Annual budget: $21.5 million

Jurisdictional structure
- Operations jurisdiction: Lowell, Massachusetts, U.S.
- Area: 14.5 square miles
- Population: 106,519
- Legal jurisdiction: City of Lowell, Massachusetts
- General nature: Local civilian police

Operational structure
- Headquarters: 50 Arcand Drive; Lowell, Massachusetts 01852
- Police Officers: 230
- Civilians: 95
- Agency executive: Greg Hudon, Superintendent of Police

Facilities
- Precinct/Substations: 10
- City Jails: 1
- Marked Patrol Vehicles: 76
- Unmarked Vehicles: 57
- Watercrafts: 21' Boston Whaler
- K-9 Units: 2

Website
- https://www.lowellma.gov/221/Police-Department

The Lowell Police Department (LPD) has the primary responsibility for law enforcement and investigation for a population of about 107,000 in the 14.5 sq mi (38 km^{2}) city of Lowell, Massachusetts. Lowell is the fourth-largest city in the Commonwealth of Massachusetts and is county seat of Middlesex County, Massachusetts. Gregory Hudon is the current superintendent of police. The department is a member of the North Eastern Massachusetts Law Enforcement Council, which provides specialized units throughout the region.

Like other urban American police forces, the Lowell Police Department was founded in the nineteenth century in response to rapid urbanization and industrialization. This brought an influx of immigrants in search of employment, increasing the city's population dramatically. In the late 1990s, Superintendent of Police, Edward F. Davis implemented innovative "community policing" strategies, which reduced Lowell's crime rate faster than any other American city with over 100,000 residents. In 2006, he left Lowell to become the commissioner of the Boston Police Department. Kenneth Lavallee succeeded him, continuing the community policing approach and reaching out to community and youth groups. In 2013, Deborah Friedl, although appointed temporarily, became the first woman chosen as police superintendent in the department's history.

== Training Academy ==
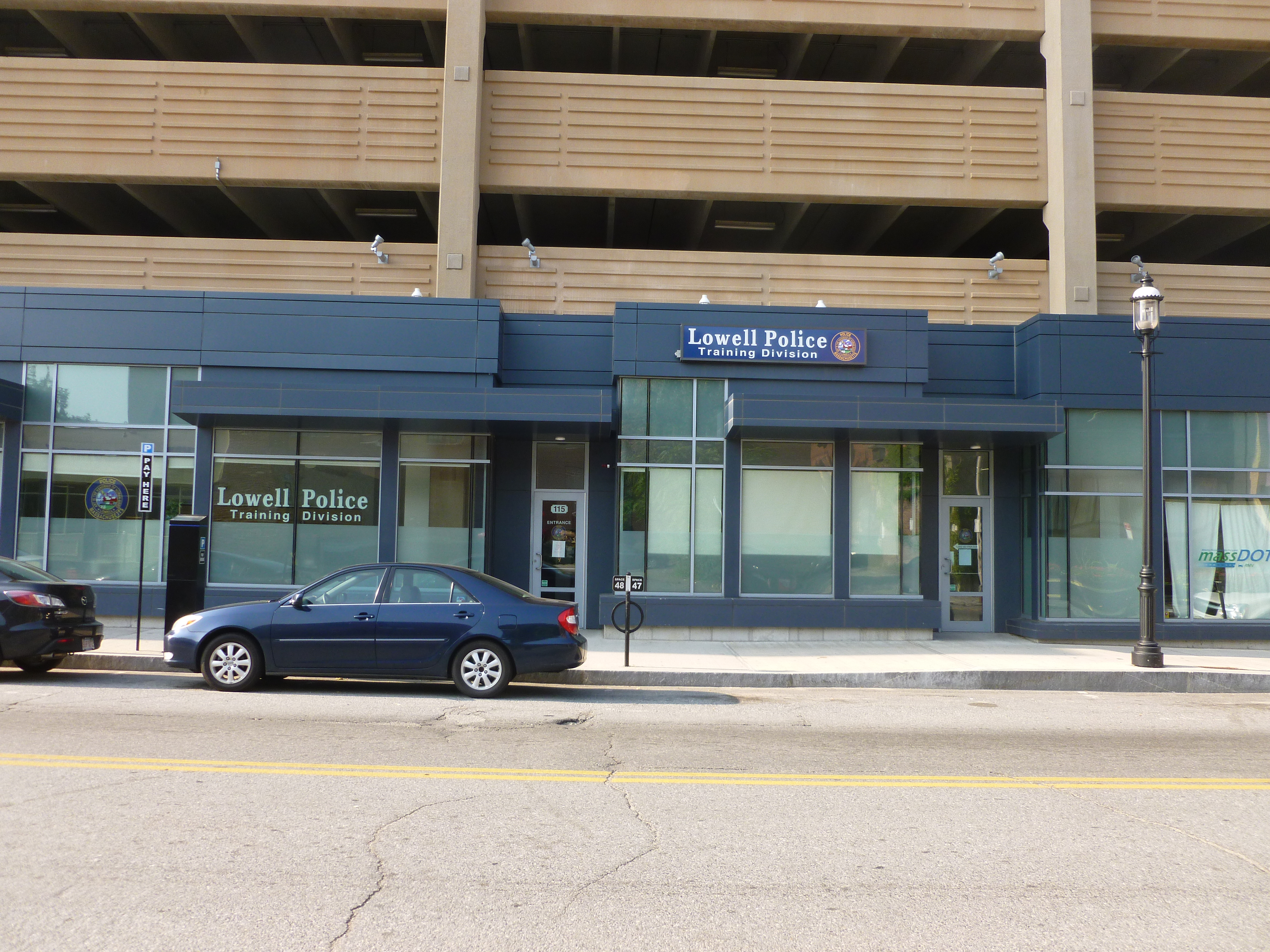
Training Division station

The Lowell Police Department's Training Division has been in operation since 1996 and has conducted in-service training for police officers from 48 cities and towns. The Lowell Police Academy consists of 50 classes over the course of 21 weeks. Student officers receive basic police training and must meet the standards established by the Massachusetts Police Training Committee (MPTC) to become a police officer. In 2010, the LPD moved its Training Division from the CrossPoint Towers to 99 Middlesex Street.The director of the Training Division is Captain James Hodgdon.

== Operations ==
The Lowell Police Department is made up of 175 Police Officers, 30 Sergeants, 13 Lieutenants, 9 Captains, 2 Deputy Superintendent, and a Superintendent. Making a total of 230 sworn officers.

=== Rank structure ===
Superintendent (1)
Deputy Superintendent (2)
Captain (9)
Lieutenant (13)
Sergeant (30)
Police Officer (184)

=== Geographic responsibility ===
Through a strategic planning process known as Geographic Responsibility, as well as input from the people of Lowell, it was determined that Crime and Disorder could be most effectively fought with the presence of a constant officer in neighborhoods. This method also seemed to be the most logical thing for supervision and accountability of each officer. There was frustration experienced by both officers and residents regarding the ability of officers to investigate neighborhood crimes. It was determined that officers who have the knowledge of a specific area and a relationship with the residents were to be assigned there, where they could best police the area. With this assignment method it is hoped that officers and residents will become more readily acquainted and will be more helpful to each other. Geographic assignment, the final phase of the Reorganization of the LPD, commenced on 17 January 1999. The city has been divided into three sectors which is each commanded by a Captain who has overall responsibility for the administration, neighborhood problems and concerns, as well as the success of his/her sector.

== Patrol Shifts ==
Platoon 1

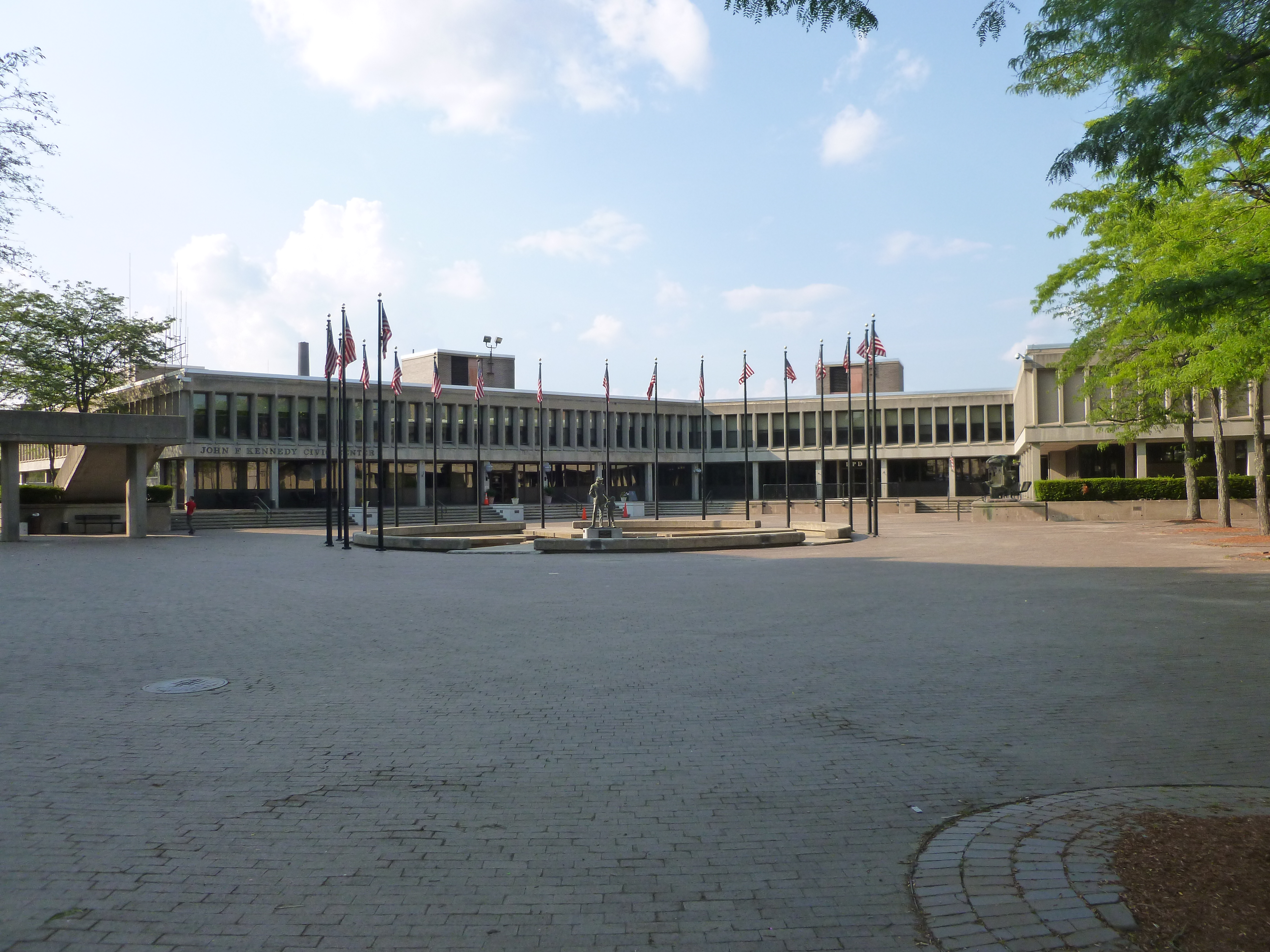
Headquarters

Late Nights Platoon 2 Day Shift Platoon 3 Early Nights

=== Sectors ===
Alpha Acre, Centralville, Downtown, Pawtucketville Bravo Belvidere, Back Central, Highlands, Lower Highlands, Sacred Heart / South Lowell

== K9 Unit ==
The Lowell Police Department currently has 3 K9 teams: Lt. Steven Gendreau and his Bloodhound named Hope; Officer Chris Hanson and his German Shepherd named Bossi; Officer Michael Bergeron and his German Shepherd Randy. These K9's perform vital functions for the LPD such as: tracking, searching, and apprehension of criminal suspects, searching for missing persons and children, assisting patrol officers with the detection of various types of illegal drugs or contraband in vehicles, luggage, or packages, assisting other officers in crowd control, responding to assist police departments from area communities when they are in need of a K9, as well as many other functions.

== Line of duty deaths ==
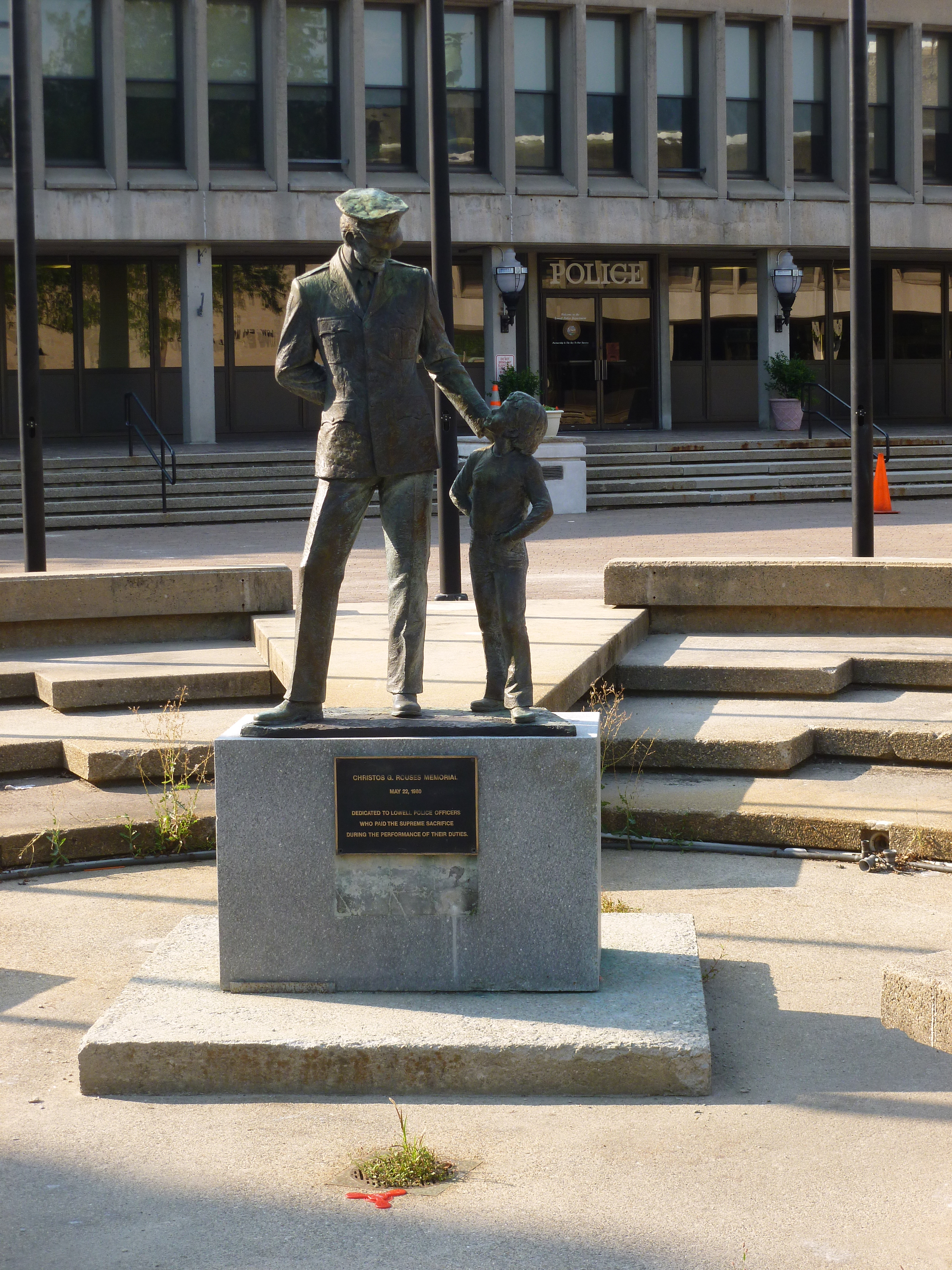
Christos G. Rouses memorial statue in Lowell's JFK Civic Center

Since its inception, the Lowell Police Department has lost four police officers in the line of duty. In 1978, Officer Christos Rouses, was shot and killed while responding to a silent alarm at a local pharmacy. In 1980, there was a memorial depicting an officer with his hand on the right shoulder of a young child placed in his honor directly in front of department headquarters at JFK Plaza. The memorial, which sits in the center of a fountain has the names of:

- Officer George F. A. Pearsall, killed by gunfire on 24 April 1957
- Officer Christos G. Rouses, killed by gunfire on 17 November 1978
- Officer Patrick F. Leavitt, died after a heart attack on 18 December 1941
- Officer John J. Winn, killed by assault on 3 May 1971

== In popular culture ==
- The department plays a prominent role in the 2010 film The Fighter, an Academy Award–winning biographical sports drama about Lowell boxer Micky Ward and his brother Dicky Eklund. Shot in and around Lowell, Sergeant Mickey O'Keefe played himself in the film.
- Multiple episodes of the Fox show Cops follow Lowell police officers while on duty.

== See also ==
- List of law enforcement agencies in Massachusetts

== History ==
Superintendents of Police
| Hugh Downey | 1925–1935 |
| Michael Winn | 1935–1949 |
| John Sayers | 1950–1955 |
| Francis O'Loughlin | 1956–1963 |
| Peter Gouduras | 1964–1971 |
| Leonard O.MacPhail | 1972–1981 |
| John Sheehan | 1982–1995 |
| Edward F. Davis III | 1995–2006 |
| Kenneth E. Lavallee | 2006–2013 |
| Deborah Friedl (Interim) | 2013 |
| William Taylor | 2013–2018 |
| Jonathan "Jack" Webb (Interim) | 2018 |
| Raymond Kelly Richardson | 2018–2021 |
| Greg Hudon | 2021–present |
