= David Silva (linguist) =

American linguist

David James Silva
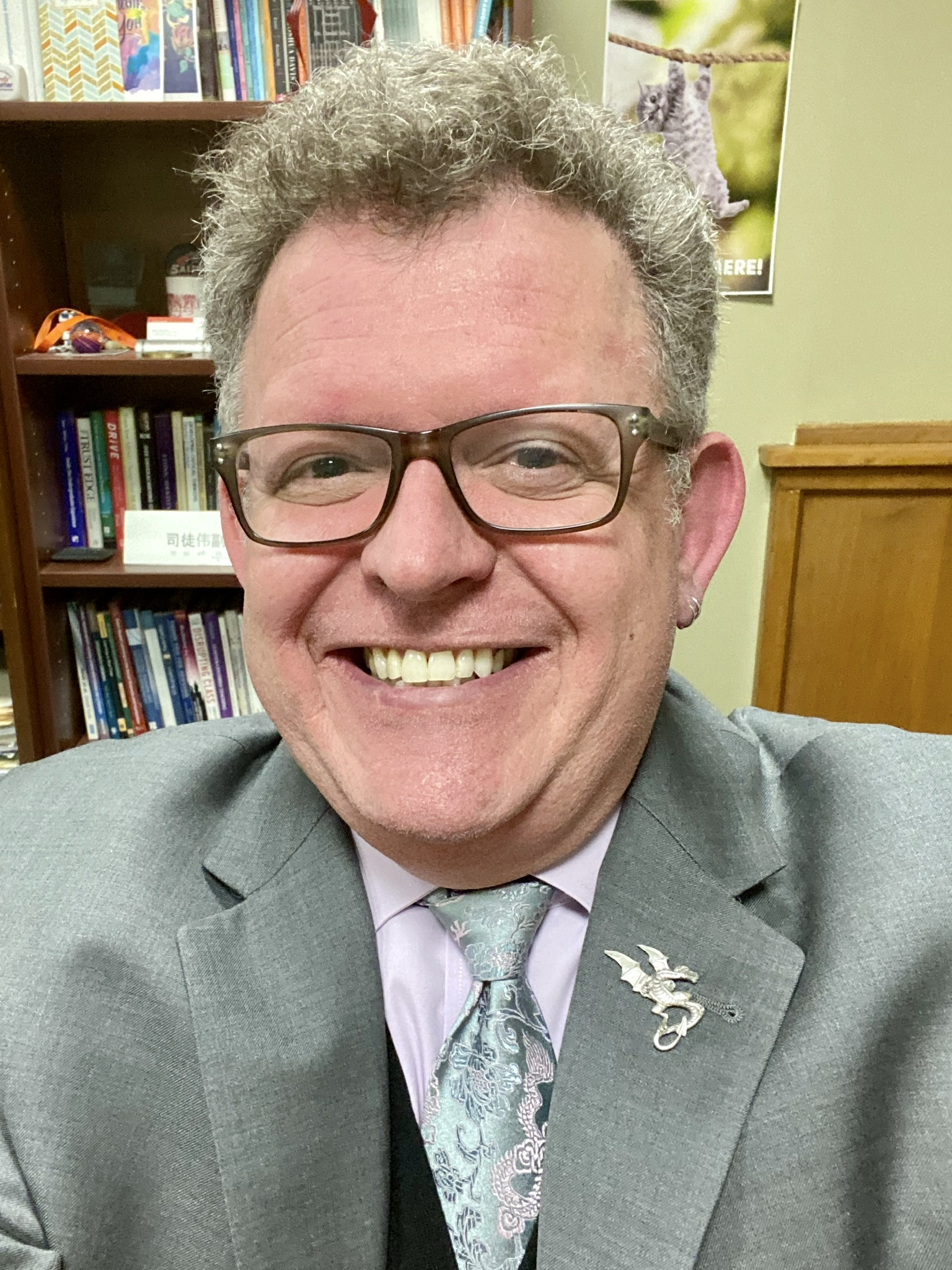
- David J. Silva, January 2020
- Born: Somerville, Massachusetts
- Title: Provost and Academic Vice President

Academic background
- Education: Harvard University (BA); Cornell University (MA, Ph.D.)
- Thesis: (1992)
- Doctoral advisor: John B. Whitman

Academic work
- Discipline: Linguistics
- Sub-discipline: Sociophonetics & Phonology
- Institutions: University of Texas at Arlington; Salem State University

David James Silva (born 1964) is an American linguist and university administrator. His phonetic, phonological, and sociolinguistic research has examined aspects of the voicing of consonants in Korean and of the vowels of the Portuguese dialect spoken in the Azores.

== Biography ==
Silva was raised in Medford, Massachusetts. He received his BA in Linguistics from Harvard University in 1986. He earned his MA and Ph.D. in Linguistics from Cornell University, completing his 1992 dissertation under the supervision of John B. Whitman.

Silva was active in the Linguistic Society of America, serving in the 1990s on the Committee of the Status of Women in Linguistics (COSWL). He held positions as Professor, Chair of Linguistics, Vice Provost for Academic Affairs, and Vice Provost for Faculty Affairs at the University of Texas at Arlington. Since 2015 he has served as the Provost and Academic Vice President of Salem State University in Massachusetts.

== Awards and distinctions ==
Silva did research in Korea by means of a Fulbright Fellowship in 1989 and a Korea Foundation Field Research Fellowship in 2004.

He has taken leadership roles in the national all-discipline honor society of Phi Kappa Phi. Silva was a charter member and first president of Chapter 300 at UT Arlington in 2007, as well as serving nationally as the society’s southwest regional representative. He has served as a columnist on education and academic topics for The Phi Kappa Phi Forum, the society’s quarterly magazine. In 2018 Silva was elected to the national Board of Directors of Phi Kappa Phi as the society's Vice President of Chapter Development.

== Linguistics career ==
Silva’s work has promoted a better understanding of smaller, non-standard dialect varieties, such as that spoken by Portuguese-American Immigrants from São Miguel. Besides phonological work that inventories the unique vowel set of the São Miguel dialect, Silva’s keynote address at the National Portuguese Honor Society induction at Rhode Island College in 2016 focused on this social responses to the variety. His talk “Every Voice Matters: The Value of Dialect Study in Portuguese Linguistic Research” highlighted negative attitudes expressed towards “Micaelense,” the Portuguese dialect spoken on the São Miguel island of the Azores.
