= Massachusetts House of Representatives' 7th Essex district =

American legislative district

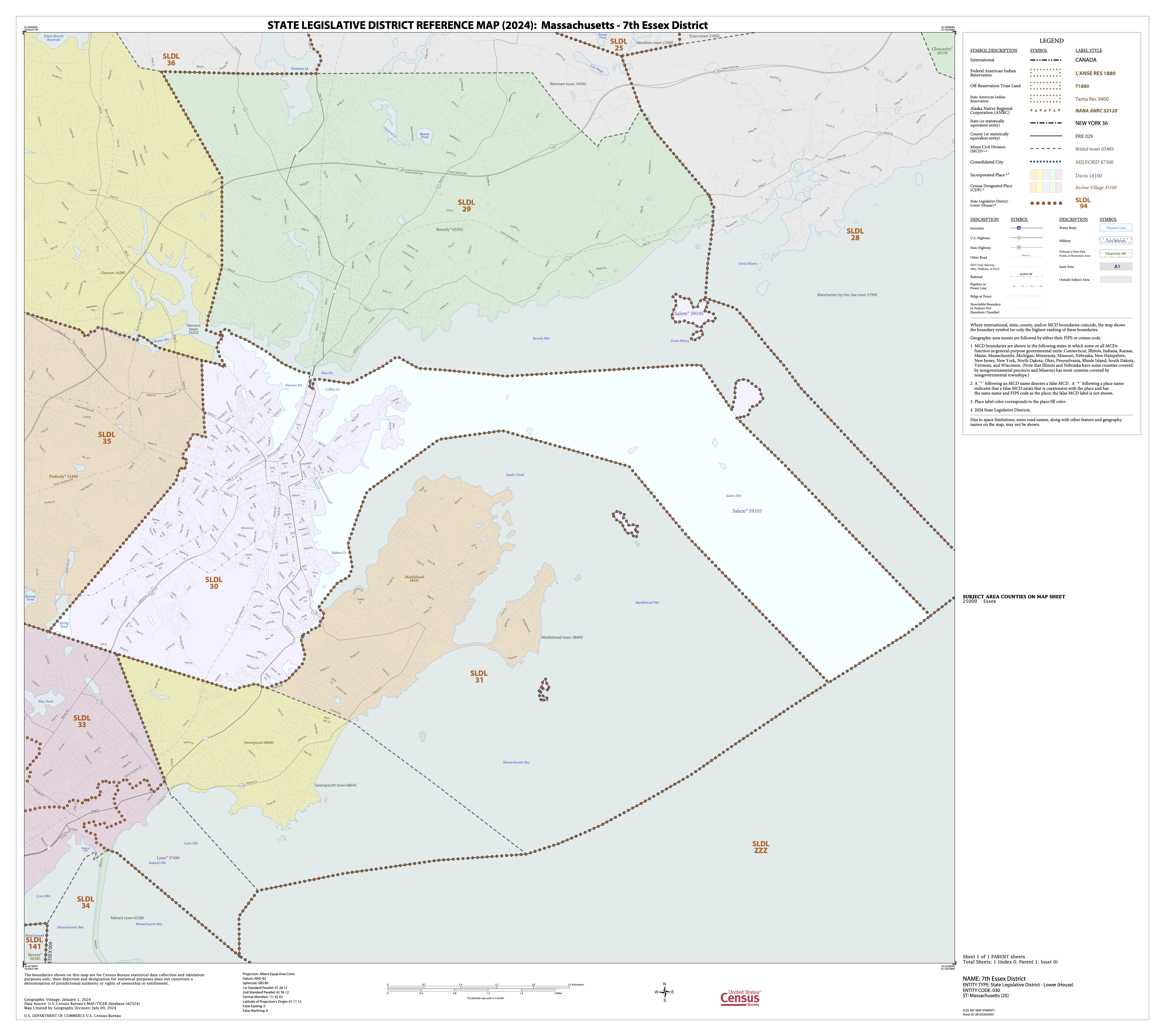
Map of Massachusetts House of Representatives' 7th Essex district, based on the 2020 United States census.

Massachusetts House of Representatives' 7th Essex district is one of 160 districts in the lower house of the Massachusetts General Court. It covers the city of Salem in Essex County. Democrat Manny Cruz of Salem has represented the district since 2023.

The current district geographic boundary overlaps with that of the Massachusetts Senate's 2nd Essex district.

== Representatives ==
- Edward H. Pearce, circa 1858
- John J. Babson, circa 1859
- Jeremiah R. Cook, circa 1859
- William A. Butler, circa 1888
- Alfred Bradbury, circa 1920
- William X. Wall, circa 1951
- Michael J. Harrington, 1969
- Robert Ellis Cahill, circa 1971
- John G. King, circa 1975
- J. Michael Ruane, 1979–2005
- John D. Keenan, 2005 – August 23, 2014
- Paul Tucker, 2015–2023
- Manny Cruz, 2023–current

== Former locales ==
The district previously covered:

- Ipswich, circa 1872
- Rowley, circa 1872

== See also ==
- List of Massachusetts House of Representatives elections
- Other Essex County districts of the Massachusetts House of Representatives: 1st, 2nd, 3rd, 4th, 5th, 6th, 8th, 9th, 10th, 11th, 12th, 13th, 14th, 15th, 16th, 17th, 18th
- Essex County districts of the Massachusett Senate: 1st, 2nd, 3rd; 1st Essex and Middlesex; 2nd Essex and Middlesex
- List of Massachusetts General Courts
- List of former districts of the Massachusetts House of Representatives

== Images ==
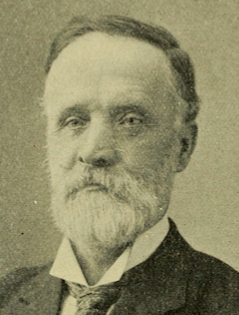
George Hyde

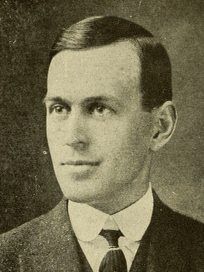
Frederick Butler

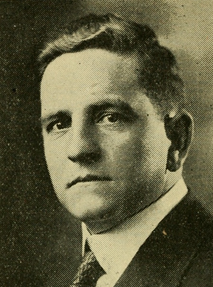
James Warren

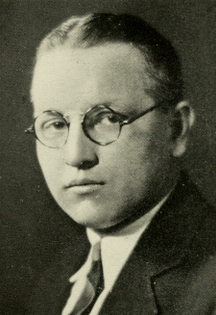
Archibald Jones

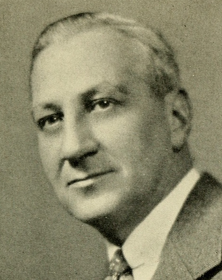
Michael Batal

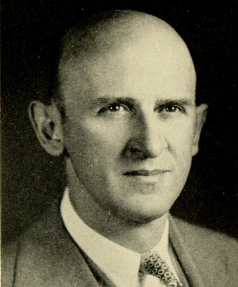
William Wall

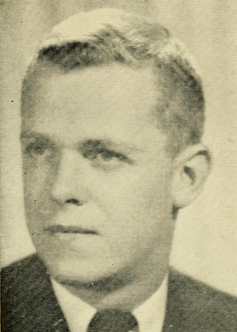
J. Hilary Rockett

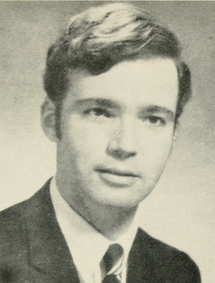
John King

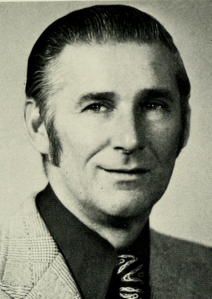
J. Michael Ruane

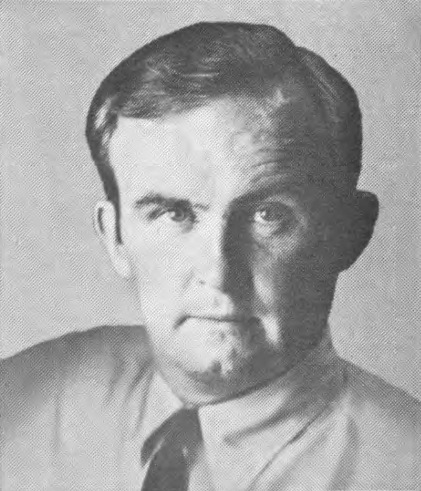
Michael Harrington
