= Salem Police Department (Massachusetts) =

Police department of Salem, Massachusetts

- Abbreviation: SPD
- Motto: In Service to the Community

Jurisdictional structure
- Operations jurisdiction: Massachusetts, U.S.
- Legal jurisdiction: City of Salem, Massachusetts
- General nature: Local civilian police

Operational structure
- Headquarters: 95 Margin St, Salem, Massachusetts
- Police Officers: 90
- Agency executive: Lucas Miller, Chief of Police

Website
- Official Website

The Salem Police Department (SPD) is the police department of the city of Salem, Massachusetts. The police headquarters was built in 1991 and is located at 95 Margin Street. As of 2021, the Chief of the Department is Lucas Miller.

== Rank structure ==
Title	Insignia	Notes
Chief of Police		
Captain		
Lieutenant		Lieutenants are typically the Watch Commander, the ranking officer in charge of the on duty shift.
Sergeant		All ranks from Sergeant and above wear a gold badge and insignia.
Police Officer/Detective		Police Officers wear a silver badge, detectives wear a gold badge with a "Detective" rocker.

== History ==
The Salem Police Department has a long history, tracing its roots back to the constables and sheriffs of the 1600s. The department was organized into its current form on May 23, 1836, by city ordinance, making it one of the oldest police departments in the country.

The department's former headquarters was located at 17 Central Street and was in use from 1914 to 1992. A new headquarters building was opened in 1992, and dedicated in the name of former Chief Robert St. Pierre on May 11, 2012.

Three officers in the Salem Police Department have died while on duty.

== Personnel ==
=== Sworn personnel ===
The following is a breakdown of the sworn personnel by city ordinance when fully staffed.

Rank	Count	Notes
Chief	1	Appointed through Civil Service
Captains	4	Appointed through Civil Service Senior captain will become acting chief in his or her absence.
Lieutenants	8	Appointed through Civil Service
Sergeants	14	Appointed through Civil Service
Patrol Officers	68	Appointed through Civil Service
Reserve Officers	21	Appointed through Civil Service
Harbormasters	1	Appointed by Mayor
Animal Control Officers	1	

=== Emergency dispatch ===
Salem PD is the primary public-safety answering point (PSAP) for the City of Salem and is the initial call point responsible for all emergency 911 calls, including medical and fire. In 2013 Salem PD responded to approximately 40,000 calls for service. Approximately 1/8 of all calls are forwarded to the Fire Department, but those calls are also served by SPD. The dispatch center also receives calls for the Salem State University and the SPD works closely with them on matters of mutual concern. The dispatch center is typically staffed by one or two civilian dispatchers, one House Officer/Dispatcher, 1 House Sergeant and 1 lieutenant (Officer in Charge). As of August 2025, all police operations (with the exception of an interop channel) are Fully Encrypted and cannot be listened to by any scanner and/or radio. They cited the need to keep operations hidden so no one outside the department can listen to them.

=== Dive team ===
The SPD maintains a highly trained dive team of full-time sworn police officers. The team is made up of eighteen police officers, including the Salem Harbormaster. Each of the divers and Harbormaster are sworn full-time police officers who hold multiple dive certifications ranging in areas to include Rapid Deployment, Rescue Diving, Search and Recovery, Black-water Diving, Ice Diving, and Underwater Criminal Investigation. The team is led by a Captain who is designated as the "Officer-in-Charge". The dive team is the sole official dive team resource of NEMLEC, which provides regional mutual aid to over 43 communities and 58 agencies in northeastern Massachusetts.

=== Criminal Investigation Division ===
The Criminal Investigation Division, also known as CID, is headed by a lieutenant, as the Unit Commander, and two sergeants as shift supervisors. There is one lieutenant, two sergeants, 8 detectives, 1 Domestic Violence Liaison Officer, 1 Animal Control Officer and 1 Latent Print Technician (Retired Detective).

== See also ==
- List of law enforcement agencies in Massachusetts
