= Salem State University =

Public university in Salem, Massachusetts, US

- Former names: Salem Normal School (1854–1932); Salem Teachers College (1932–1960); Salem State College (1960–2010)
- Type: Public university
- Established: 1854; 172 years ago
- Accreditation: NECHE
- Endowment: $66,300,000(2024)
- President: John Keenan
- Provost: David Silva
- Faculty: 302 (full-time)
- Students: 6,239 (fall 2023)
- Undergraduates: 4,853 (fall 2023)
- Postgraduates: 1,396 (fall 2023)
- Location: Salem, Massachusetts, U.S. 42.5034°N 70.8911°W
- Campus: Suburban, 115 acres (47 ha)
- Colors: Lapis blue & Halloween orange
- Nickname: Vikings
- Sporting affiliations: NCAA Division-III (MASCAC, LEC, CHC)
- Website: www.salemstate.edu

Salem State University (Salem State or SSU) is a public university in Salem, Massachusetts, United States. Established in 1854, it is the oldest and largest institute of higher education on the North Shore and is part of the state university system in Massachusetts.

The university offers a wide range of bachelor's and master's degrees as well as post-master's certificates in more than 40 academic disciplines. It is the only member of the Massachusetts public higher education system with a graduate program in social work. As of Fall 2020, Salem State enrolled 5,716 undergraduate and 1,526 graduate, full- and part-time students, from 37 states and 48 foreign countries.

== History ==
=== Foundation and early years ===
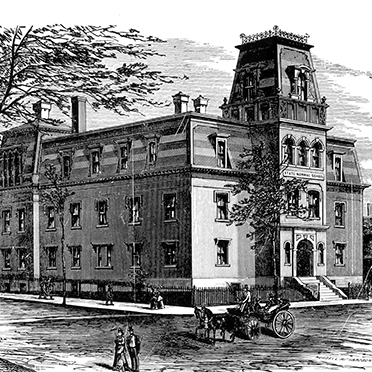
Salem Normal School, c. 1870s

Salem State University was founded in 1854 as the Salem Normal School under the guidance of Horace Mann in his efforts to bring accessible teaching education around the country. The Salem Normal School was the fourth normal school to open in Massachusetts, and only the tenth to open in the United States. The City of Salem endowed the school with its original location at 1 Broad Street. Initially, the school was a two-year, post-secondary educational institution reserved for women.

Early alumnae helped bring community service and education to others around the country such as Charlotte Forten, a graduate of the class of 1856, who was the first African-American school teacher to journey south and teach freed slaves. Other graduates would teach elementary and high schools as far as Africa, Asia and the Middle East. As the demand for teachers increased nationwide, the Salem Normal School prospered. The original building had to be renovated in 1871 to meet the growing enrollment.

=== New location ===
The school moved to its current location in South Salem in 1896 in the building known today as the Sullivan Building on North Campus. A few years later the Horace Mann Laboratory School was opened right next door.

In 1898, the student body became co-educational, although male enrollment remained small until the introduction of a commercial program in 1908, which combined professional business practice with pedagogical instruction. In 1921, the state authorized the normal schools to offer four-year degree programs, the first one offered being commercial education.

The school was renamed to Salem Teachers College in 1932 and was authorized to grant master's degrees (M.Ed) in 1955. The first degrees were awarded in 1957. Following World War II and the passage of the G.I. Bill, enrollment increased significantly, particularly among male students, and new programs were added to accommodate this growth.

=== Growth and development ===
In 1960, the school was renamed to Salem State College after being authorized to offer various bachelor's degrees in liberal arts and Bachelor of Science degrees in business.

Salem State's physical campus, restricted to North Campus at the time, developed quite rapidly during the 1960s under the leadership of President Frederick Meier. Peabody and Bowditch Halls were built on North Campus in 1965. Bowditch hall reflected the trends of multiple-story building construction during the first half of the Cold War, with a fallout shelter being built under the building with a capacity of 985 people. Meier Hall was also constructed in 1965, and the Ellison Campus Center shortly thereafter in 1966. Throughout the 1970s, the school continued to expand its physical campus by constructing a new library, the O’Keefe Athletic Center, and by purchasing the land for what is today known as South Campus.

==== President Nancy Harrington ====
In the mid-1990s, the college moved forward with purchasing a 37.5-acre (15.2 ha) industrial site on Loring Avenue. The site was formerly home to a lightbulb plant owned by the General Telephone & Electronics Corporation, formerly Sylvania Electric Products. When GTE decided to exit the electrical equipment market, they sold off their former factory to Salem State. That site, is today known as Central Campus. It houses the Bertolon School of Business and three residence complexes: Charlotte Forten Hall, Marsh Hall and Atlantic Hall.

=== University status ===
On July 26, 2010, Massachusetts Governor Deval Patrick signed into law a bill that elevated Salem State College and eight other public institutions to university status. The school officially became Salem State University on October 26, 2010.

On September 10, 2021, Central Campus was renamed to Harrington Campus in honor of President Nancy Harrington who died the year earlier.

On February 29, 2024, Viking Hall was renamed to Charlotte Forten Hall in honor of alumna Charlotte Forten.

== Organization and administration ==
The university is led by an eleven-member board of trustees. The governor appoints nine trustees to five-year terms, renewable once. The Alumni Association elects one trustee for a single five-year term and the student body elects one student trustee for a one-year term. In 2017, the university's trustees selected John D. Keenan as the 14th president of the university. He began in this position in August 2017, with a formal inauguration in January 2018.

== Academics ==
Salem State University comprises six academic sub-units:

- Bertolon School of Business (3 departments)
- College of Arts and Sciences (20 departments)
- Maguire Meservey College of Health and Human Services (3 departments, 2 schools: School of Nursing, School of Social Work)
- School of Education (2 departments)
- School of Continuing and Professional Studies
- School of Graduate Studies

The university is also home to the Salem State University Honors Program, an approved constituent of the statewide Massachusetts Commonwealth Honors Program. Salem State University is accredited by the New England Commission of Higher Education.

=== Honor societies ===
In addition to hosting chapters of various disciplinary honor societies, e.g. Delta Mu Delta for business students, the university hosts chapters of two national cross-disciplinary honor societies:

- Alpha Lambda Delta
- Phi Kappa Phi

=== Global partnerships ===
Salem State University has partnered with several universities in the People's Republic of China through a consortium overseen by the American Association of State Colleges and Universities, including a cohort-based program in English with students from Nanjing Normal University. The university has also entered into partnership with other international institutions in Germany, Italy, Poland, and Mexico.

== Campus ==
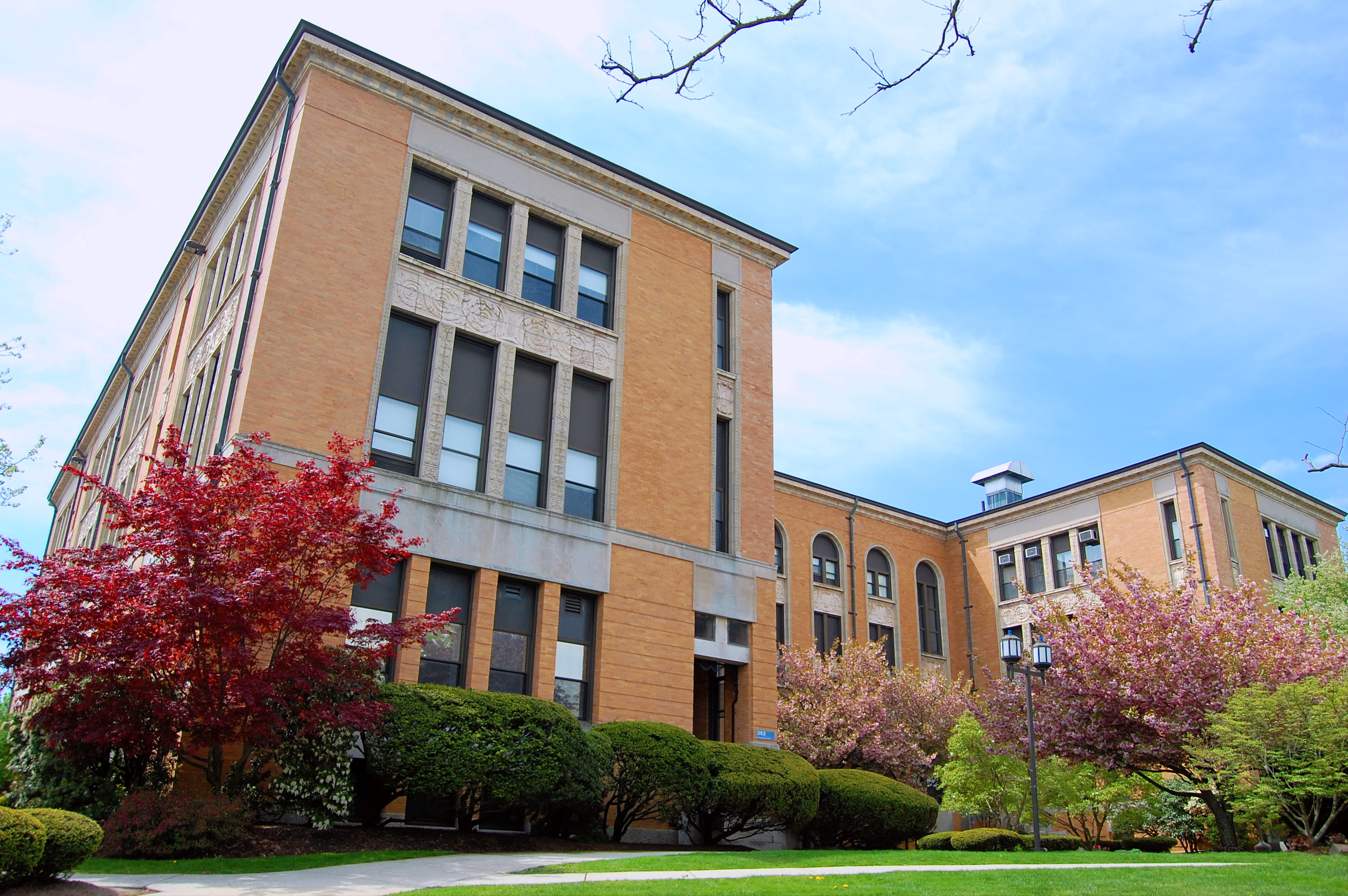
Edward Sullivan Building at the intersection of Lafayette Street and Loring Avenue

Salem State University is divided into six unique campuses totaling a land-mass of 115 acres with approximately thirty-three buildings. The main campus (North Campus) is located about a mile south of downtown Salem at the intersection of Lafayette Street and Loring Avenue. Within short walking distance from north campus is central campus, south campus, the School of Social Work, and the Richard O'Keefe Athletic Center. The university also operates a maritime facility at Cat Cove on the Salem harbor; located a mile north of the main campus.

=== North Campus ===
North Campus is the oldest and largest of the school's four main campuses. It contains the school's two largest academic buildings, two out of the school's five residential halls, the school library, the central administration building, the theater, and a campus center.

The majority of the university's arts and science programs are housed within the two academic buildings on North Campus; the Edward Sullivan Building and Frederick Meier Hall.

- The Sullivan Building is the oldest current building at the university, being first used in 1896. It sits at the northern end of North Campus at the intersection of Lafayette Street and Loring Avenue. Sullivan is an academic building primarily used for gen-ed courses and humanities, housing the math, english, history, and philosophy departments, as well as being home to the McKeown School of Education, the oldest program at Salem State.
- Meier Hall is the largest academic building at the university and home to the College of Arts & Sciences. It sits on Lafayette Street between the school administration building and the Berry Library. It was built in 1965 during president Frederick Meier's tenure, for whom the building was named. Meier Hall is home to a variety of departments such as biology, chemistry, political science, geography, geological sciences and economics. It also has an observatory and greenhouse on the roof, as well as a Dunkin' on the first floor facing the street.

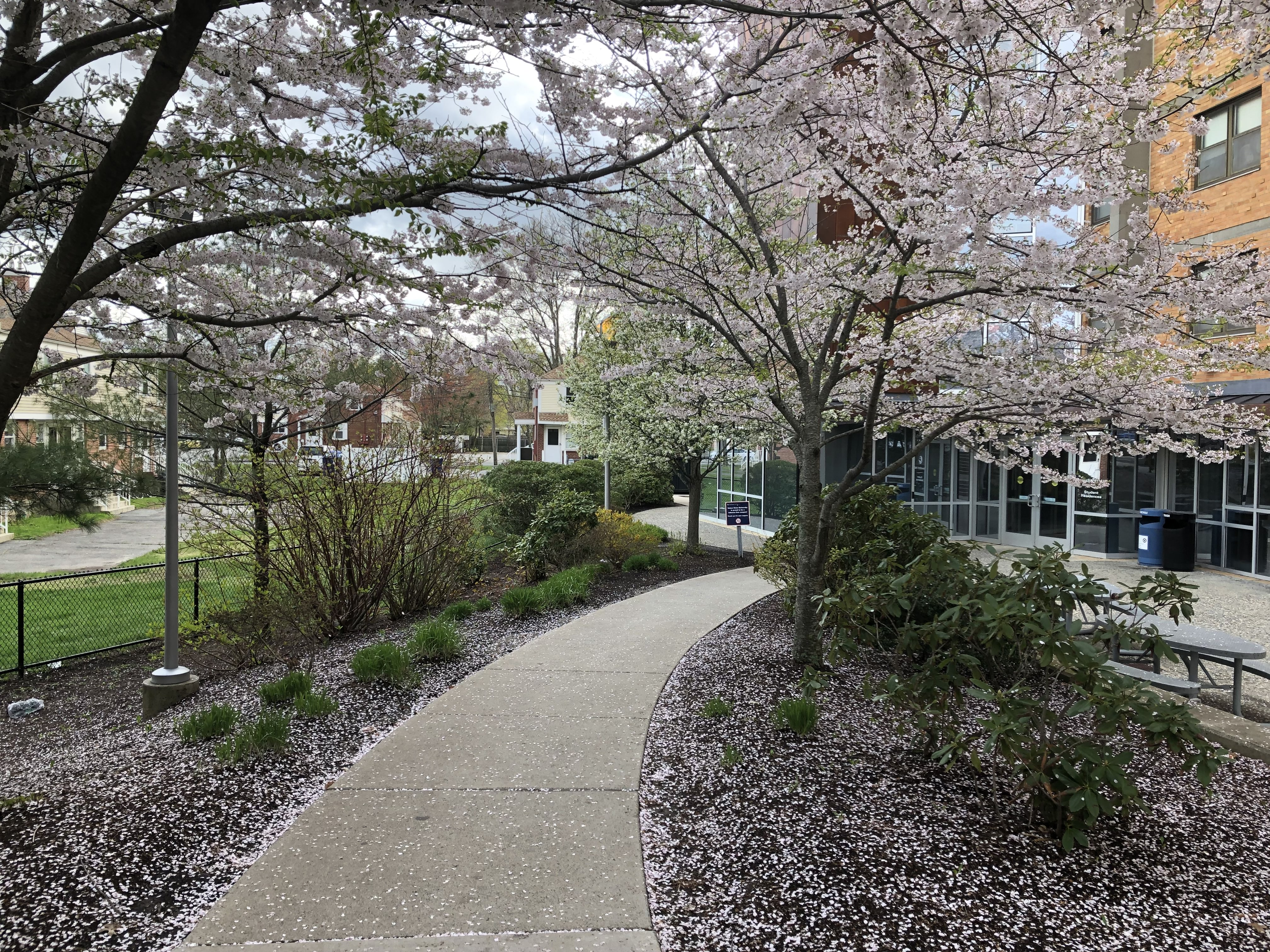
Walkway in front of Bowditch Hall in springtime

North Campus has two of the school's five residential halls, Bowditch Hall and Peabody Hall, which are also the school's two oldest residential halls, both being built in 1965 under president Frederick Meier's tenure. They are identical in design, having a dormitory style with rooms built for two people each. They originally served as the stratifying dorms for male and female students on campus regardless of grade, but are now both co-ed and instead designated for students of particular grade levels.

- Bowditch Hall is one of the two residential halls on North Campus and one of the two residential halls designated for freshman housing, the other being Marsh Hall on Central Campus. Named for Nathaniel Bowditch, Bowditch Hall was originally the school's men's dormitory. Bowditch Hall is six stories high and sits on Loring Avenue.
- Peabody Hall is the second of the two residential halls on North Campus and is one of the three residential halls designated for upperclassman housing, alongside Atlantic Hall and Forten Hall, both located on Central Campus. Peabody Hall was originally the school's women's dormitory. Today, Peabody Hall primarily serves as the upperclassman option for single dorms. It is seven stories high and sits on College Drive between the Berry Library and the North Campus Parking Garage.

A focal point of North Campus is the George H. Ellison Campus Center which houses the career and counseling centers as well as a number of student organizations. Other facilities on North campus include the Frederick E. Berry Library & Learning Commons, North Dining Commons and Sophia Gordon Performing Arts Center. The Horace Mann Laboratory School stood on North Campus until 2018, when it was moved to the site of the former Nathaniel Bowditch Elementary School in Salem.

=== Harrington Campus ===
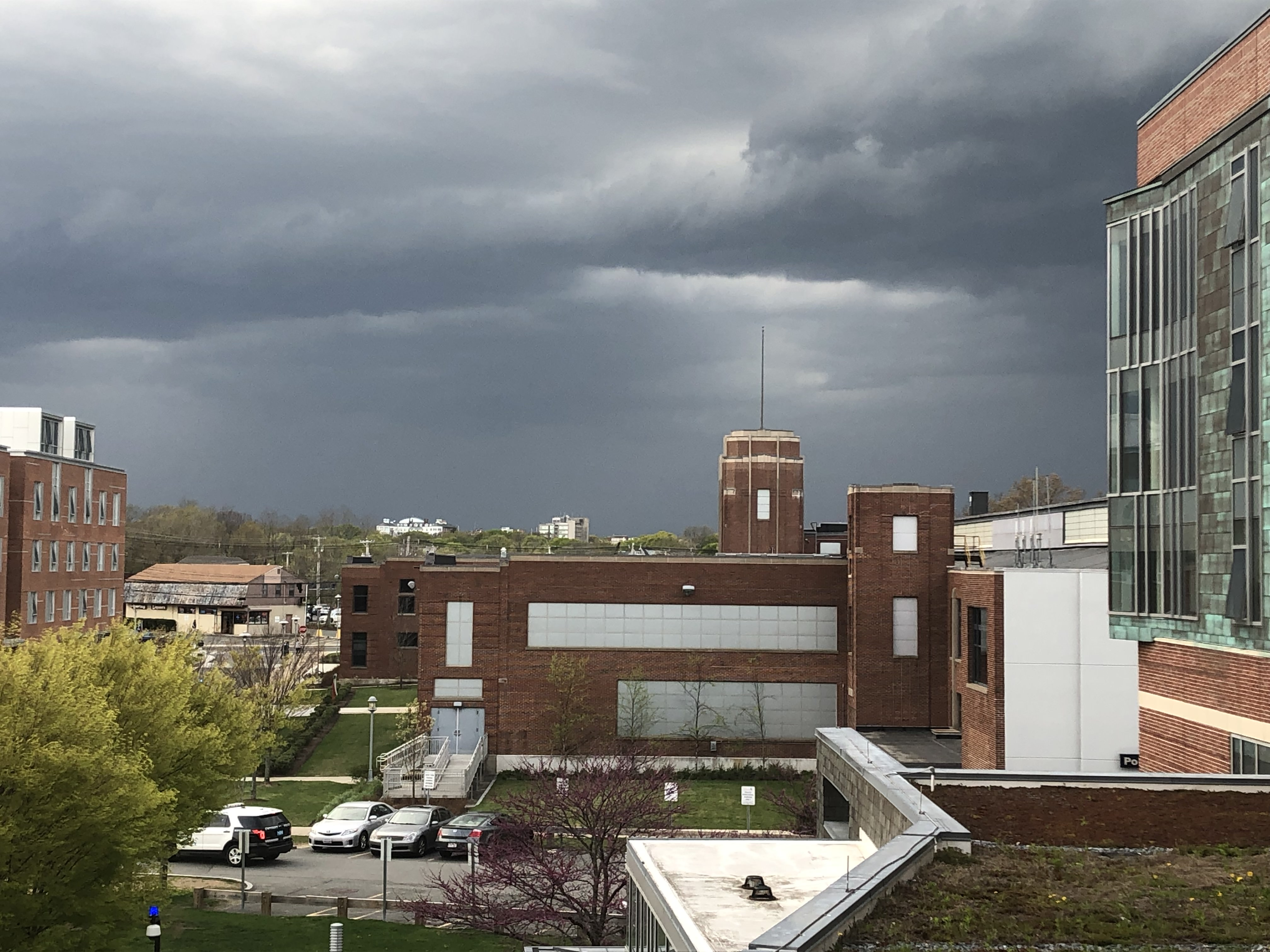
Central Campus looking northwest from Marsh Hall

Central campus is the second largest of the five campuses. The Bertolon School of Business, the music department, and the communications department are all housed in the one academic building on central campus, the Classroom Building. Three residence halls, Marsh, Viking and Atlantic house residents, with all residents having a choice of where they want to live. A focal point of central campus is the university's Enterprise Center (small business center). Other facilities on central campus include the campus bookstore, old admissions center, campus police station, recital hall, and the university's baseball field and tennis courts.

=== O'Keefe Center ===
The O'Keefe Center houses the Sport and Movement Science department and the university's athletic department. Facilities include Twohig Gymnasium, Rockett Ice Arena, Alumni Field, and the Gassett Fitness Center.

=== South Campus ===
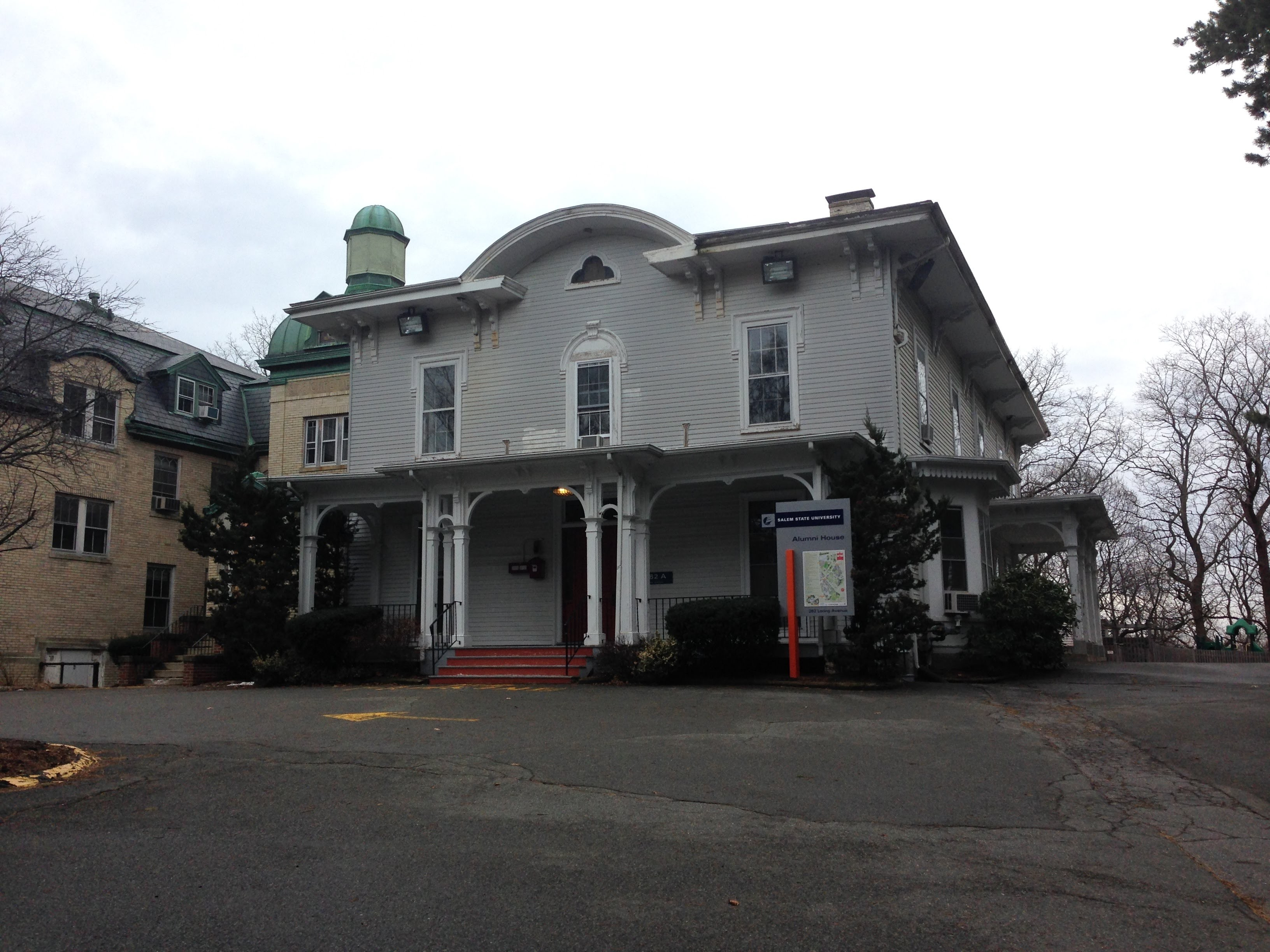
Alumni Hall on Upper South Campus

South campus houses the university's College of Health and Human Services. The School of Nursing and the criminal justice department are housed in the two academic buildings on south campus; the Kevin B. Harrington Building and the Academic Building. Junior and senior resident students are housed on south campus in the Bates Residence Complex. Other facilities on south campus included the Alumni House and the Center for International Education.

School of Social Work

The Salem State School of Social Work is located at 297 Lafayette St., just a short walk from North Campus. It is a former synagogue purchased by the university in 2014, and houses many of the classes for the School of Social Work.

Cat Cove Maritime Facility (no longer operational)

Salem State operated a maritime facility at Cat Cove on the Salem harbor. The facility was used to provide interactive, hands-on educational experience for students majoring in marine biology. In the past, Cat Cove had been used to study local shellfish.

== Student life ==
Undergraduate demographics as of Fall 2023
Race and ethnicity	Total
White	56%
Hispanic	23%
Black	9%
Two or more races	4%
Asian	3%
International student	3%
Unknown	3%
Economic diversity
Low-income (Note: The percentage of students who received an income-based federal Pell grant intended for low-income students.)	39%
Affluent (Note: The percentage of students who are a part of the American middle class at the bare minimum.)	61%

=== Greek life ===
Salem State has several Greek life organizations for men and women.

=== Speaker series ===
The Salem State University Speaker Series was established in 1982 with former President of the United States Gerald Ford as the series' first guest. Since then, the university has hosted several political leaders, activists, and celebrities.

== Athletics ==
Salem State University athletic teams participate as a member of the National Collegiate Athletic Association's Division III. The Vikings are a member of the Massachusetts State Collegiate Athletic Conference (MASCAC).

Men's Athletics

- Baseball
- Basketball
- Golf
- Ice Hockey
- Lacrosse
- Soccer
- Tennis

Women's Athletics

- Basketball
- Dance
- Field Hockey
- Ice Hockey
- Lacrosse
- Soccer
- Softball
- Tennis
- Volleyball

=== National championships ===
Association	Division	Sport	Year	Opponent/Runner-up	Score
NCAA (1)	Division III (1)	Women's Basketball (1)	1986	Bishop	89–85

== Notable alumni ==
=== Creative and performing arts ===
- Tracee Chimo – Actress
- Elizabeth Updike Cobblah – Artist
- Keith Knight (1990) – Cartoonist
- Julie McNiven – Actress
- Mark Parisi (1984) – Cartoonist

=== Education ===
- Charlotte Forten Grimké (1856) – Anti-slavery activist
- Ida M. Eliot (1867) – Educator, Philosopher

=== Government and politics ===
- Demetrius Atsalis – Member of the Massachusetts House of Representatives (1999–2013)
- Donald C. Bolduc (1989) – Brigadier General, United States Army
- Arthur Broadhurst (1988) – Member of the Massachusetts House of Representatives (1993–2007)
- Michael A. Costello (1989) – Member of the Massachusetts House of Representatives (2003–2014)
- Kim Driscoll (1989) – Mayor of Salem, Massachusetts (2006–2023) and 73rd lieutenant governor of Massachusetts (2023–present)
- Robert Fennell (1978) – Member of the Massachusetts House of Representatives (1995 – 2016)
- Brian Lees (1975) – Member of the Massachusetts State Senate (1989–2007, minority leader from 1993 to 2007)
- Joan Lovely (2006) – Member of the Massachusetts State Senate (2013–present)
- John F. Tierney (1973) – Member of the United States House of Representatives (1997–2015)

=== Sports ===
- Dick Lamby (1975) – Professional hockey player
- Tom Thibodeau (1981) – Head coach of the NBA's New York Knicks

=== Other ===
- Walter Day (dropped out in 1978) – Video game record keeper
- Mary H. Graves (graduated 1860) – Minister, Literary Editor, Writer
- Emil Pagliarulo – Video game producer
- Annie Stevens Perkins (graduated 1887) – Writer
