= Dan Wetzel =

American sportswriter

Dan Wetzel is an American author, screenwriter, documentary film producer, podcaster, and a Senior Writer for ESPN. He was previously the national columnist for Yahoo! Sports.

== Career ==
As a sports writer, he works at ESPN. He previously worked as the national columnist for Yahoo Sports and Yahoo.com, covering events around the world, including the NFL, college football, the NBA, NASCAR, MLB, NHL, mixed martial arts, men's and women's World Cups and the Olympics. His columns appear In the sports section of Yahoo.com.

He's appeared repeatedly in the anthology the Best American Sports Writing, been honored more than a dozen times by the Associated Press Sports Editors and is regularly a finalist for "National Sportswriter of the Year" which is awarded by the National Sports Media Association.

At Yahoo! Sports he has been part of major investigative stories on pro and college sports, including scandals at Miami, Ohio State, Connecticut, Oregon, USC, the IOC, FIFA, various sports agencies and with in the NCAA itself. He also specializes in sports crime, including covering high-profile cases and trials of Jerry Sandusky, Larry Nassar, Aaron Hernandez and others.

As a screenwriter he cowrote the 2014 movie Life of a King, starring Cuba Gooding, Jr. and Dennis Haysbert.

He is an executive producer of the Netflix three part docu-series Killer Inside: The Mind of Aaron Hernandez about the life, crimes and death of former New England Patriot Aaron Hernandez. It is in conjunction with Blackfin Entertainment and Momentum Content, both in New York. He also appears in the series.

He cohosts a weekly radio show on Yahoo Sports Radio with Pat Forde. He was a fill-in host on The Sports Inferno in Detroit, Michigan on AM 1270. He anchors the twice-weekly College Football Enquirer podcast with Pat Forde and Ross Dellenger. It consistently ranks as one of the most listened to college football podcasts in the country.

New York Times best-selling author who has written several sports-related books, including the Epic Athletes series of biographies for children.

Wetzel is a native of Norwell, Massachusetts and a 1994 graduate of the University of Massachusetts Amherst, where he was editor of the campus newspaper (The Daily Collegian) and majored in political science.

=== Bibliography ===
- Sole Influence: Basketball, Corporate Greed and the Corruption of America's Youth about sneaker companies and AAU Basketball.
- Glory Road with Don Haskins, about the 1966 Texas Western Miners, the first college basketball team to start five African-American players. It was turned into a 2006 Disney movie also titled Glory Road.
- Runnin' Rebel: Shark Tales of "Extra Benefits," Frank Sinatra, and Winning It All, with former UNLV basketball coach Jerry Tarkanian.
- Resilience: Faith, Focus, Triumph, with Alonso Mourning, chronicling the life and recovery from a kidney transplant of the Hall of Fame player.
- Death to the BCS: The Definitive Case Against the Bowl Championship Series, with Josh Peter and Jeff Passan, an investigation into the college football bowl industry and system formerly used to determine the national champion.

==== Epic Athletes ====
Biographies for young readers

- Stephen Curry
- Caitlin Clark
- Alex Morgan
- Serena Williams
- Tom Brady
- LeBron James
- Lionel Messi
- Simone Biles
- Kevin Durant
- Patrick Mahomes
- Zion Williamson

== Views ==
Dan Wetzel is a passionate opponent of the BCS system for determining the NCAA Division I FBS National Football Championship. He regularly writes on the desirability of a playoff to determine the national champion, and has co-authored a book entitled Death to the BCS.

You’re here because you’re like us. You hate the Bowl Championship Series. Despise it. Loathe it. Want it to disappear tomorrow. It is a pox on college football, and you just wish someone would find the vaccine.

— Promotional website for Death to the BCS

On March 18, 2013, Wetzel authored a series of articles on the Steubenville High School rape verdict that quickly went viral. That included a final article on the sentencing of two teenage boys. It differed starkly in tone from other coverage of the case, eschewing sympathy for the rapists' "ruined lives" and instead emphasizing the pervasive rape culture that permitted the rape to go forward, including the potential culpability of witnesses to the rape. Numerous media outlets and advocates for the prevention of sexual assault advocated that Wetzel's coverage should win awards "for going beyond the obvious ... victim-blaming." Poynter called it an example of "exactly the kind of reporting we need more of."

== Criticism ==
On February 22, 2014, Dan Wetzel posted an article on Yahoo entitled: "Deal with it, South Korea". The article was criticized in South Korea for affirming the result of the ladies' singles figure skating event at the XXII Olympic Winter Games, a result that the South Korean Olympic Committee formally protested.
