= Durham v. United States =

Durham v. United States can refer to:

- Durham v. United States, 401 U.S. 481 (1971)
- Durham v. United States, 214 F.2d 862 (D.C. Cir. 1954)
