= Super Bowl XLVI =

2012 National Football League championship game

New York Giants (4) (NFC) (9–7)	New England Patriots (1) (AFC) (13–3)
21	17
Head coach: Tom Coughlin	Head coach: Bill Belichick
	1	2	3	4	Total
NYG	9	0	6	6	21
NE	0	10	7	0	17
- Date: February 5, 2012
- Kickoff time: 6:30 p.m. EST (UTC-5)
- Stadium: Lucas Oil Stadium; Indianapolis, Indiana
- MVP: Eli Manning, quarterback
- Favorite: Patriots by 2.5
- Referee: John Parry
- Attendance: 68,658

Ceremonies
- National anthem: Kelly Clarkson
- Coin toss: Curtis Martin representing the 2012 Pro Football Hall of Fame class
- Halftime show: Madonna featuring LMFAO, M.I.A., Nicki Minaj, and Cee Lo Green

TV in the United States
- Network: NBC
- Announcers: Al Michaels (play-by-play); Cris Collinsworth (analyst); Michele Tafoya (sideline reporter)
- Nielsen ratings: 47.0 (national); 56.7 (Boston); 56.4 (Indianapolis); 49.7 (New York); US viewership: 111.3 million est. avg., 166.8 million est. total
- Market share: 71 (national)
- Cost of 30-second commercial: $3.5 million

Radio in the United States
- Network: Dial Global
- Announcers: Kevin Harlan (play-by-play); Boomer Esiason (analyst); James Lofton and Mark Malone (sideline reporters)

Super Bowl XLVI was an American football game between the National Football Conference (NFC) champion New York Giants and the American Football Conference (AFC) champion New England Patriots to decide the National Football League (NFL) champion for the 2011 season. The Giants defeated the Patriots by the score of 21–17. The game was played on February 5, 2012, at Lucas Oil Stadium in Indianapolis, the first and as of 2026, only time that the Super Bowl was played in Indiana.

In addition to winning their fourth Super Bowl and eighth NFL championship overall, the Giants set a new record for the lowest regular season record (9–7, win percentage of 56.3%) by a Super Bowl champion. The Patriots entered the game with a 13–3 regular season record, and were also seeking their fourth Super Bowl win. This was a rematch of Super Bowl XLII, which the Giants also won, spoiling the Patriots' run at a perfect 2007 season. The Giants and the Patriots also played in Week 9 a few months earlier, with the Giants winning on the road 24–20.

The Giants jumped to a 9–0 lead in the first quarter of Super Bowl XLVI before the Patriots scored 17 unanswered points to take a 17–9 lead in the third quarter. But the Giants prevented the Patriots from scoring again, and two consecutive Giants field goals chipped away the Patriots' lead, 17–15, late in the third quarter. The Giants capped off an 88-yard drive with running back Ahmad Bradshaw's 6-yard game-winning touchdown with 57 seconds left in the game. The drive is most remembered for quarterback Eli Manning throwing a 38-yard pass to Giants wide receiver Mario Manningham on the sideline in double coverage. The catch was immediately challenged by Patriots head coach Bill Belichick but after review officials ruled that Manningham had maintained possession and stayed in bounds and gave the Giants momentum. Manning, who completed 30 of 40 passes for 296 yards, one touchdown, and no interceptions, was named Super Bowl MVP for the second time in his career. He became the third consecutive quarterback to win the award after Aaron Rodgers in Super Bowl XLV and Drew Brees in Super Bowl XLIV. He was also the first Giants quarterback to start and win two championship games since Ed Danowski in 1938.

The broadcast of the game on NBC broke the then record for the most-watched program in American television history, previously set during the previous year's Super Bowl. Super Bowl XLVI was watched by an estimated average audience of 111.3 million US viewers and an estimated total audience of 166.8 million, according to Nielsen, meaning that over half of the American population watched at least some of the initial broadcast. The game also set the record for most tweets per second during a sporting event, with 13.7 million tweets from 3 p.m. to 8 p.m. (PST).

As of 2026, this remains the most recent Super Bowl victory and appearance for the Giants. They were also the last New York City-based team to win a championship in one of the top four North American sports leagues until the New York Knicks won the NBA championship in 2026. The 14-year drought between championships from 2012 to 2026 was the longest in New York City's history, and its longest since a seven-year championship drought from 1962 to 1969.

== Background ==
Per convention as an even-numbered Super Bowl, the Patriots as the AFC representatives had the home team designation. Super Bowl XLVI was the sixth Super Bowl in which the two teams had competed in a previous Super Bowl matchup, as the Giants and Patriots had previously met in Super Bowl XLII. Both head coaches (Tom Coughlin and Bill Belichick) and both starting quarterbacks (Eli Manning and Tom Brady) returned from Super Bowl XLII.

=== Host selection process ===
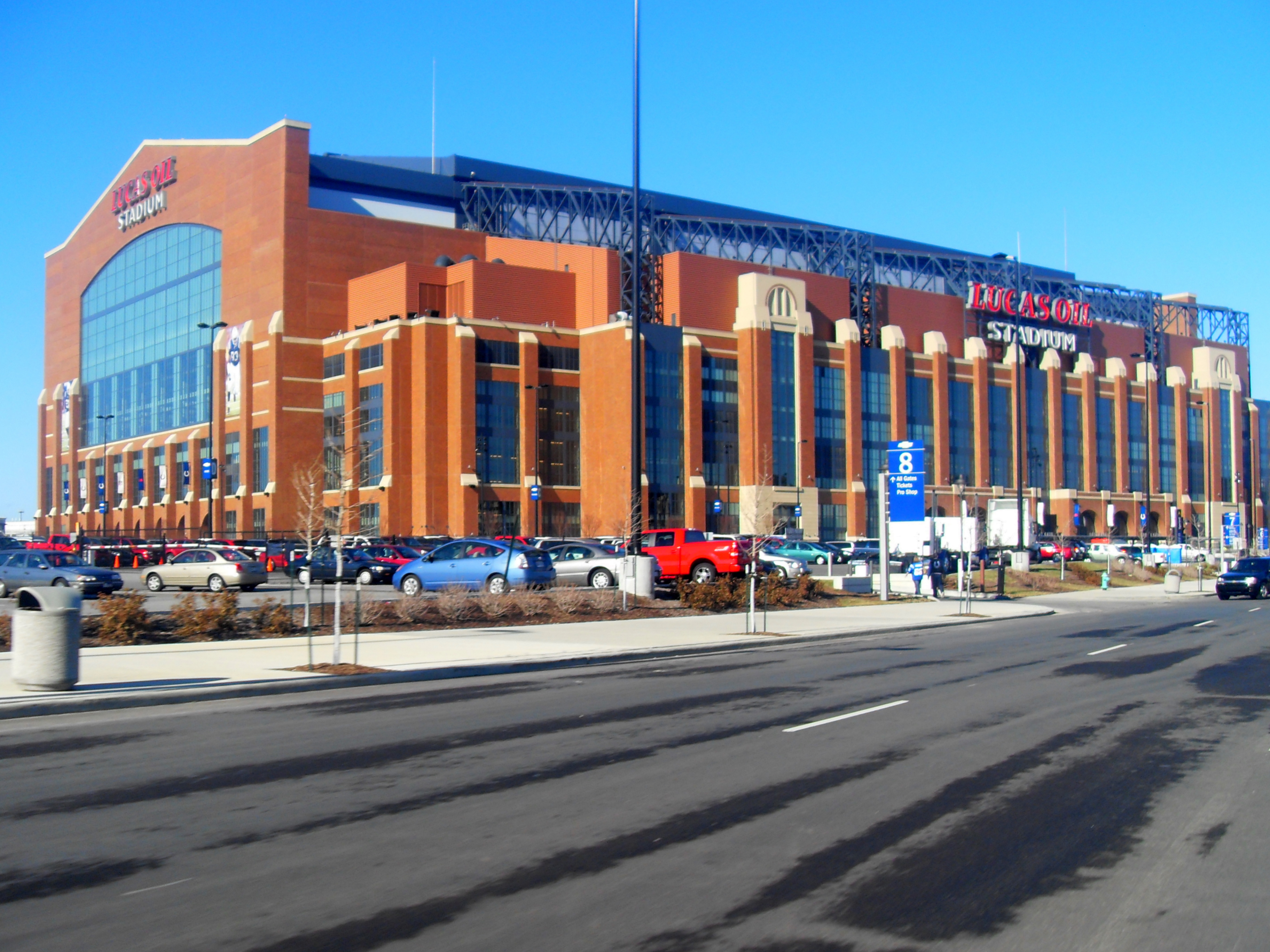
Lucas Oil Stadium in Indianapolis, Indiana

Three cities presented bids for the game:

- On January 31, 2008, the Greater Houston Convention and Visitors Bureau announced their plans to host the game at Reliant Stadium, and holding events at the surrounding Reliant Park, hoping that their city would host the championship game for the second time since Reliant Stadium opened.
- On February 19, 2008, the City of Indianapolis, led by Colts owner Jim Irsay and Indianapolis mayor Greg Ballard, officially announced details about their intentions to bid for Super Bowl XLVI. Part of the agreement included a proposal to build a practice facility on the campus of Arsenal Technical High School that would be utilized by the school after the Super Bowl.
- On March 6, 2008, one month after hosting Super Bowl XLII at the University of Phoenix Stadium in Glendale, Arizona, the second Super Bowl held in the Phoenix metropolitan area, the Arizona Super Bowl Host Committee led by Committee chair Mike Kennedy formally announced their intentions to bid for another one. Glendale would eventually win its bid for Super Bowl XLIX in February 2015.

NFL franchise owners selected the Indianapolis bid at their meeting on May 20, 2008, in Atlanta.

A labor dispute had threatened the postponement or cancellation of the game during the spring and summer of 2011; league officials had set contingency plans to postpone the game one week if it had been necessary to postpone regular season games into the second week of January. Since the dispute was resolved well before the start of the regular season, no postponements were implemented, and the game remained as originally scheduled.

This was the first Super Bowl to be played in Indianapolis, and only the fourth time that the Super Bowl has been played in a cold-weather city, after Detroit (XVI and XL) and Minneapolis (XXVI). Downtown Indianapolis, the home of Lucas Oil Stadium, featured an outdoor Super Bowl Village and other programs at the Indiana Convention Center.

=== Teams ===
==== New York Giants ====
Working around a series of injuries, the Giants ended with a 9–7 record during the regular season and returned to the playoffs for the first time since 2008, winning the NFC East and finishing the season as the NFC's No. 4 seed. Finally back to full strength, the Giants entered their week 17 matchup with the Dallas Cowboys with both teams tied for the division lead with 8–7 records. The Giants took a 21–0 first half lead and while the Cowboys closed the gap to make the score 21–14 early in the 4th quarter, the Giants held on to defeat the Cowboys 31–14, clinching the divisional title and a playoff berth.

New York's offense was led by Super Bowl XLII winning quarterback Eli Manning, in his seventh season as the team's starter. Manning set new career highs in nearly every statistical category in 2011, throwing for a franchise record 4,933 yards and 29 touchdowns, with 16 interceptions, giving him a 92.9 passer rating. His top target was receiver Victor Cruz, who caught 82 passes for a franchise record 1,536 yards (3rd in the NFL) and 9 touchdowns. He had plenty of other targets, including Hakeem Nicks (76 receptions, 1,192 yards, 7 touchdowns), Mario Manningham (39 receptions and 523 yards in 12 games) and tight end Jake Ballard (38 receptions, 604 yards).

Although not on the field for four games due to injury, running back Ahmad Bradshaw was the team's leading rusher with 659 yards and 9 touchdowns. He was also a reliable weapon in the passing game, hauling in 34 receptions for 267 yards and two touchdowns. Brandon Jacobs also made contributions on the ground, rushing for 571 yards and 7 touchdowns.

New York's defensive line was led by defensive ends Justin Tuck, Jason Pierre-Paul and Osi Umenyiora. Pierre-Paul racked up 86 combined tackles and ranked fourth in the NFL with 16.5 sacks, earning him the only Pro Bowl selection on the Giants defense, while Umenyiora, limited to 9 games because of injury, recorded 9 sacks and 2 forced fumbles. The Giants secondary was led by Corey Webster, who intercepted a career-high 6 passes. Defensive backs Kenny Phillips and Aaron Ross added four interceptions each, while safety Antrel Rolle picked off two passes and led the team in combined tackles with 96.

The Giants joined the 2008 Arizona Cardinals and 1979 Los Angeles Rams as the only other team to advance to the Super Bowl with fewer than ten victories since the NFL expanded to a 16-game season in 1978, and the only one of those three to win the Super Bowl they had advanced to. They have won six consecutive playoff games away from their home stadium, dating back to their victory over the Tampa Bay Buccaneers in the 2007 Wild Card round. That includes their Super Bowl XLII victory over these same Patriots, although that game was played at a neutral site (and the Giants were the designated "away" team for the game). The 2011 Giants are the first team in NFL history to reach the Super Bowl after having been outscored by their opponents in the regular season (394 points scored, 400 points allowed).

==== New England Patriots ====
The Patriots finished with a 13–3 record, winning the AFC East and clinching the AFC's No. 1 seed in the playoffs. New England lost 2 consecutive games to the Steelers and Giants in week 8 and 9 respectively, before rallying to win their remaining eight games.

Back at the helm of the offense was 12-year quarterback Tom Brady, who earned his 7th Pro Bowl selection. Starting every game of the season, Brady completed 65.6% of his passes for a career-high 5,235 yards (the second highest total in NFL history at the time) and 39 touchdown passes, with just 12 interceptions and a rating of 105.6. Brady also added 109 yards and three scores on the ground. His main weapon in the passing game was Pro Bowl receiver Wes Welker, who led the NFL with 122 receptions (22 receptions ahead of second place) for 1,569 yards and 9 touchdowns. New England also had two of the best tight ends in the NFL: Pro Bowler Rob Gronkowski, who set new tight end records for receiving (1,327 yards) and touchdown catches (17); and Aaron Hernandez, who caught 79 passes for 910 yards and 7 touchdowns, while also rushing for 45 yards. Another big element of the passing game was veteran receiver Deion Branch, who caught 51 passes for 702 yards and 5 scores. Receivers Chad Ochocinco, Tiquan Underwood, Julian Edelman, and Matthew Slater made minor contributions to the passing attack; the latter two also served as emergency defensive backs. Edelman was also a superb punt returner, returning 28 punts for 296 yards and a touchdown.

New England had several key contributors in the ground game. Their main rusher was BenJarvus Green-Ellis, who rushed for 667 yards and 11 touchdowns. Running back Stevan Ridley added 447 yards and a 5.1 yards per carry average. Danny Woodhead contributed 351 yards with a 4.6 YPC average, and gained another 437 yards returning kickoffs. New England also had a solid offensive line, which was anchored by Pro Bowl guards Logan Mankins and Brian Waters. With all these weapons, New England ranked third in the NFL with 513 points.

The Patriots' defensive line featured two Pro Bowl selections: Vince Wilfork, who generated 3.5 sacks, two interceptions, and one forced fumble; and Andre Carter, who contributed 10 sacks and forced two fumbles. Defensive End Mark Anderson was also a major force on the line, earning 10 sacks and two forced fumbles of his own. Behind them, Rob Ninkovich excelled at linebacker, gaining 74 tackles, 6.5 sacks, and two interceptions. In the secondary, cornerback Kyle Arrington had a breakout season. After recording just one interception in his first three years, Arrington picked off 7 passes in 2011 to lead the NFL in that category, while also making 88 tackles. Linebacker Jerod Mayo led the team in tackles with 95.

With the victory in the 2011 AFC Championship Game Brady and head coach Bill Belichick became the first quarterback-head coach combination to reach the Super Bowl five times, surpassing the record held by Terry Bradshaw and Chuck Noll of the Pittsburgh Steelers' 1970s Super Bowl teams. Belichick tied Tom Landry for second most appearances as a head coach in the Super Bowl, behind only Don Shula's six.

=== Season and playoffs ===
The Patriots and Giants faced each other in New England during the regular season; the Giants won that game, 24–20. Incidentally, the Giants and Patriots had also faced each other in New York during the regular season prior to Super Bowl XLII with the Patriots winning that regular season matchup and the Giants going on to win that Super Bowl. Super Bowl XLVI marked the 13th Super Bowl that was a rematch of a regular season game. The loser in the regular season had been 7–5 in these games prior to Super Bowl XLVI.

The Giants finished the season as the NFC East champion and the No. 4 seed in the conference. The Giants defeated the No. 5 seed Atlanta Falcons in the Wild Card round 24–2, the first playoff game at MetLife Stadium. Eli Manning threw for 277 yards and 3 touchdowns with no interceptions, while the Giants defense shut down the Falcons, with the only Falcons points coming from a safety given up by Manning's intentional grounding penalty in his end zone.

The Giants then moved on to face the No. 1 seed and the defending Super Bowl XLV champion Green Bay Packers in the divisional round. The Giants never trailed in the game, winning 37–20. One of the key plays in the game was a Hail Mary pass by Manning to Hakeem Nicks, giving the Giants a 20–10 lead at the end of the first half. As they did to 2007 MVP Tom Brady and the Patriots' record-breaking offense, the Giants generated significant pressure on Packers quarterback and season MVP Aaron Rodgers, sacking him four times and disrupting his talented receiving corps. This was the first time in NFL history a 15–1 team failed to make it past the divisional round in the playoffs.

The Giants then faced the No. 2 seeded San Francisco 49ers in the NFC Championship Game. After a series of defensive standoffs in the fourth quarter, the game went into overtime. Both teams continued to struggle on offense, until Giants linebacker Jacquian Williams stripped the ball from 49ers wide receiver Kyle Williams after a punt return. The Giants recovered the ball at the 49ers 24-yard line, setting up a 31-yard field goal attempt by Giants kicker Lawrence Tynes. Unlike Cundiff earlier that day, Tynes' kick was successful, giving the Giants a 20–17 victory.

As the No. 1 seed in the AFC, the Patriots earned a first-round bye and home field advantage throughout the AFC playoffs. In the divisional round, the Patriots defeated the Denver Broncos 45–10. The Patriots dominated the game throughout, setting new franchise postseason records for total yards (509), points (45), and margin of victory (35). Tom Brady completed 18 of 25 passes for 246 yards and a postseason record five touchdowns in the first half. The Patriots defense had a breakout performance: Broncos quarterback Tim Tebow was held to just 9 of 26 completions and was sacked five times.

In the AFC Championship Game, the Patriots faced off against the No. 2 seeded Baltimore Ravens. Brady was out-dueled by Ravens quarterback Joe Flacco, who threw for more yards and touchdowns on the same number of completions and attempts. Nevertheless, the Patriots managed to take a 23–20 lead in the fourth quarter on a 1-yard run by Brady. With 1:44 left in the quarter, The Ravens got the ball back with one last chance to tie or win the game, driving all the way to the Patriots 14-yard line. But the Patriots managed to hold them there, with cornerback Sterling Moore breaking up two consecutive Ravens pass attempts in the red zone, including one in the end zone. Facing fourth down, the Ravens attempted a 32-yard field goal by kicker Billy Cundiff that would tie the game and possibly bring it to overtime. Cundiff missed the kick wide left, allowing the Patriots to advance to the Super Bowl.

=== Super Bowl pre-game notes ===
The Patriots, as the designated home team, had a choice of wearing their home navy blue jerseys or their white away jerseys. Briefly, there was speculation that the Patriots might wear the white away jerseys in order to switch the jerseys from Super Bowl XLII, where the Patriots wore dark blue and the Giants wore white. Also, the Giants were 4–0 in playoff games in their white away jerseys since the 2007 season. However, the Patriots announced on the Monday following the Conference Championship Games that they would be wearing their customary navy blue home jerseys as the home team in Super Bowl XLVI.

Hospitality experts speculated that "Indianapolis will have seen the most severe hotel price gouging in Super Bowl history." The city has 6,000 hotel rooms, fewer than typical for a Super Bowl host city. Some rooms in downtown Indianapolis reportedly cost more than $4,000 a night. By contrast, rooms close to the stadium in previous Super Bowls were usually available for about $200. The room shortage and high prices caused some attendees to plan to stay in Chicago, 180 miles away, and ride buses to events.

Because the Giants and Patriots drew their fan bases from New York City and Boston respectively, the Super Bowl echoed the fierce rivalry between the Boston Red Sox and New York Yankees in Major League Baseball. Tom Brady said of the rivalry: "There is a great rivalry...between Boston and New York...When I got to the team, it was always Red Sox-Yankees. We've had some pretty meaningful games against the Giants over the past few years, so I don't think anyone is disappointed that it's the Giants." Overall, this was the seventh meeting between teams from Boston and New York City for a major professional sports championship. This previously occurred in Super Bowl XLII in 2008, two Stanley Cup Finals (1929, 1972), and three World Series (1912, 1916, 1986).

== Broadcasting ==
=== Television ===
==== United States ====
In the United States, the game was televised nationally by NBC.

Al Michaels called play-by-play for NBC, marking the eighth time that he was behind the microphone for a Super Bowl and the second time he called a Super Bowl for NBC (Michaels had previously done play-by-play for Super Bowls XXII, XXV, XXIX, XXXIV, XXXVII, and XL for ABC and Super Bowl XLIII for NBC). This was the first NBC Super Bowl without John Madden as he retired after Super Bowl XLIII. Cris Collinsworth was the color analyst for the game, his second Super Bowl as a game analyst and first since he was in the booth for Super Bowl XXXIX for Fox. Michele Tafoya was the sideline reporter. Bob Costas and Dan Patrick (who also presided over the trophy presentation ceremony) hosted the pregame, halftime, and postgame coverage for NBC with Football Night in America analysts Tony Dungy and Rodney Harrison and special guest analysts (who were seated next to Costas during the pre-game festivities), Aaron Rodgers and Hines Ward. Also helping out on NBC's broadcast were reporters Alex Flanagan, Liam McHugh, and Randy Moss and NFL insiders Mike Florio and Peter King.

===== Advertising =====
All commercials for the game sold out by Thanksgiving 2011, at an average price of $3.5 million per thirty-second ad, by far the highest rate for Super Bowl advertising in the event's history. At least one thirty-second advertisement commanded a price of $4 million.

Anti-abortion activist Randall Terry has said he was planning to run an advertisement featuring graphic photos of aborted fetuses during Super Bowl XLVI. Terry was not allowed to air the ad nationwide, given that the networks have a policy under equal time rules to reject all political and issue related advertising during the Super Bowl. He was able, however, under the then-current Federal Election Commission "reasonable access" rules, to force up to 35 local stations (those located in states in which the Democratic Party primaries are within 45 days of Super Bowl Sunday; Terry entered the primary as a dummy candidate primarily for the purpose of this advertisement) to run the advertisement uncensored, regardless of whether it meets Standards and Practices or Federal Communications Commission guidelines. The FCC ruled against Terry on February 3, two days before the game, when NBC owned-and-operated WMAQ-TV in Chicago refused to air the ad, citing the same equal-time statutes and the fact that Terry did not appear to be a bona fide candidate. The largest station to allow Terry to air his advertisement was WHDH in Boston, Massachusetts.

An advertisement from Pepsi featured Melanie Amaro, the winner of season one of the Fox series The X Factor. Other confirmed advertisers included Doritos (continuing its user-generated "Crash the Super Bowl" contest), Bridgestone, Volkswagen (a 60-second spot advertising the third-generation Beetle featuring dogs barking to the tune of "The Imperial March"), General Motors (four for Chevrolet; including a commercial featuring "We Are Young" by fun. that led to a massive sales spike; and one for Cadillac), Toyota, Hyundai, Acura (featuring Jerry Seinfeld in an ad for the NSX), Kia Motors (advertising the Optima with a spot starring Adriana Lima), Audi (parodying the Twilight series with an ad for the S7), Honda (starring Matthew Broderick in a reprisal of the lead role in Ferris Bueller's Day Off), newcomers Dannon Yogurt and Century 21 Real Estate, Teleflora, Mars, Incorporated (introducing the M&M's brown spokescandy), The Coca-Cola Company, CareerBuilder.com (reprising their chimp advertisement campaign), Cars.com, Skechers, Relativity Media (running four advertisements for Act of Valor), Paramount Pictures, Walt Disney Pictures, and Universal Pictures. Anheuser-Busch has purchased nine slots during the game. An advertisement for Priceline.com purportedly killed off the "Priceline Negotiator", which would have ended William Shatner's role as spokesman for the company (a role he has held for over a decade), to make way for a new campaign that will premiere during the game; however, it was later revealed that the new campaign would keep Shatner. An ad for Old Milwaukee beer featuring Will Ferrell aired a single time on only one station in Nebraska.

Disney's ad for its upcoming John Carter was seen as exacerbating concerns about the expensive tentpole film's marketing that had been raised by its teaser the preceding August. While admitting he was "pleasantly surprised" by it, Collider's Adam Chitwood said he was "still not convinced that the general audience has a handle on what the film's about." An executive at a competing studio said the trailer strongly reinforced concerns that the film had experienced serious production problems that adversely affected its quality and box-office prospects. "It's like, 'Guys, this is your Hail Mary?'" The ad's ineffectiveness was cited as one of many reasons the movie failed upon its release the following month, leading Disney to take a $200 million writedown on the film.

Chrysler aired a two-minute half time advertisement titled "Half Time in America", produced by the Wieden+Kennedy agency and narrated by Clint Eastwood. The ad drew the criticism of several leading U.S. conservatives, who suggested that its messaging implied that President Obama deserved a second term and, as such, was political payback for Obama's support for the federal bailout of the company. Both Chrysler chief marketing officer Olivier François and Chrysler Chairman and CEO Sergio Marchionne denied that the ad was intended as a politically oriented message. Overall, the ad was considered one of the better ones that aired during the game.

There has also been some conjecture regarding the possible plagiarism of Australian band John Butler Trio's song "Zebra" by Yogurt giant Dannon. Spokesman for the band, Tom McNamara, commented that the band was currently exploring their proprietary rights with regards to the similarity of the tune to the band's hit single.

Matthew Broderick reprised his Ferris Bueller's Day Off role in a Honda commercial aired during this Super Bowl which featured the Oh Yeah song. A teaser for the ad had appeared two weeks prior to the Super Bowl, which had created rumors of a possible film sequel. It was produced by Santa Monica-based RPA and directed by Todd Phillips. AdWeek's Tim Nudd called the ad "a great homage to the original 1986 film, with Broderick this time calling in sick to a film shoot and enjoying another day of slacking." On the other hand, Jalopnik's Matt Hardigree called the spot "sacrilegious".

==== International ====
NFL International televised the game to viewers outside of North America, with Kenny Albert and Joe Theismann calling the English language feed.

Country	Channel	Notes
Australia	ESPN, Network Ten, One	
Austria	Puls 4	120,000 viewers, 45.1% market share
Belgium	Be Sport 1, Prime Sport 1	
Brazil	ESPN (available in HD) and TV Esporte Interativo	
Canada	CTV, RDS	NBC coverage simulcast on CTV and subject to simultaneous substitution. TSN Radio carried the Dial Global U.S. radio broadcast. Estimated 8.1 million viewers, with 50% of national population (17 million people) tuning in at some point (statistics from TSN).
China	Dragon TV, G-Sports	
Denmark	TV3+, TV3+ HD	
Finland	Nelonen Pro 1, Nelonen Pro 2	Pro 1 Finnish commentary, Pro 2 English commentary
France	BV sports W9 ESPN	326 000 viewers, 9.4% share and 17.3% in Men 15–49
Germany	Sat.1, ran.de (online), Sport1+, ESPN America HD	1.23 million viewers, 27.1% market share; Sat.1 has been criticised for its vast extent of commercial breaks during its broadcast, e.g. the touchdown that made the score 10–9 and field goal have not been shown live due to broadcast of image trailer
Greece	Nova Sports	
Hungary	Sport 1	NFL Network coverage.
Ireland	BBC, Sky Sports (UK channels)	
Iceland	ESPN America	
Israel	Sport 5 (available in HD)	
Italy	Sportitalia and ESPN America	
Japan	NHK BS1, NTV G+	
Latin America	ESPN and Fox Sports (both available in HD)	
Mexico	Televisa, TV Azteca	
Netherlands	ESPN	
New Zealand	ESPN	
Norway	Viasat Sport Norge, Viasat Sport HD	
Poland	Polsat Sport, ESPN America	
Portugal	SportTV	Live and in High-Definition on SportTV 2 and SportTV 2 HD from 11:00 pm WET. The event was also shown live and in HD on ESPN America and ESPN America HD.
Romania	Sport 1	
Russia	NTV Plus	
Serbia	ESPN America	
Slovenia	Šport TV	
South Africa	ESPN	
Spain	Canal+ 1	
Sweden	TV10, Viasat Fotboll, Viasat Fotboll HD	
United Kingdom	BBC, Sky Sports (both available in HD)	

=== Streaming ===
This was the first legal online streaming of a Super Bowl telecast in the United States, available on computers via NFL.com and NBCSports.com, and mobile devices via Verizon Wireless's NFL Mobile app.

As part of "Operation Fake Sweep", Immigration and Customs Enforcement, along with the United States Attorney for the Southern District of New York, seized and shut down 16 websites that had provided access to pirated Internet television feeds of NFL games on February 2, in an action similar to the crackdown they had implemented the previous year. For the first time, domains in the .tv top-level domain were also seized, despite that TLD's allocation to Tuvalu.

=== Radio ===
Super Bowl XLVI was carried nationwide on radio over the Dial Global radio network, with Kevin Harlan as play-by-play announcer, Boomer Esiason as color analyst, and James Lofton and Mark Malone as sideline reporters. Locally, the game was broadcast by the New York Giants Radio Network flagship (WFAN) and the New England Patriots Radio Network flagship (WBZ-FM). Bob Papa called the game for the Giants with Carl Banks as his analyst and Howard Cross as sideline reporter, while Gil Santos was at the microphone for the Patriots with Gino Cappelletti as analyst and Scott Zolak as sideline reporter. Santos and Cappelletti returned for their sixth Super Bowl as broadcast team for the Patriots while Papa and Banks called their third and second Super Bowls, respectively, for the Giants. This was the first Super Bowl broadcast for the Giants not to feature longtime analyst Dick Lynch, who had retired from the team's radio booth following the 2007 season and died in 2008. As per the NFL's rules, all the other stations in the Giants and Patriots radio networks (as well as WCBS-AM in New York, which serves as a preseason overflow station for the Giants) carried Dial Global's feed.

BBC Radio 5 Sports Extra produced its own radio broadcast, with Darren Fletcher, Rocky Boiman, and Greg Brady announcing.

== Entertainment ==
=== Pregame ===
The Indiana University Marching Hundred performed during the pre-game show.

On January 12, 2012, it was reported that former American Idol winner Kelly Clarkson would sing the National Anthem at Super Bowl XLVI. It marks the fourth time in the previous five years that an American Idol contestant has performed the national anthem (joining Carrie Underwood, Jennifer Hudson and Jordin Sparks). Clarkson was accompanied by the Indianapolis Children's Choir. Husband-and-wife country musicians Blake Shelton and Miranda Lambert performed "America the Beautiful" as part of the ceremonies. American Sign Language translation for both songs was performed by Rachel Mazique, the currently reigning Miss Deaf America.

The coin toss ceremony featured the recent inductees to the Pro Football Hall of Fame. Curtis Martin, one of the inductees, was originally selected to toss the coin, but in what NESN described as "a rather awkward scene", referee John Parry ended up flipping the coin himself while Martin stood beside and watched. The Patriots won the toss, the first AFC team to do so in the Super Bowl in 15 years. Because the coin toss landed on heads, the pizza chain Papa John's offered free pizza to millions of Americans who participated in a promotional contest.

=== Halftime ===
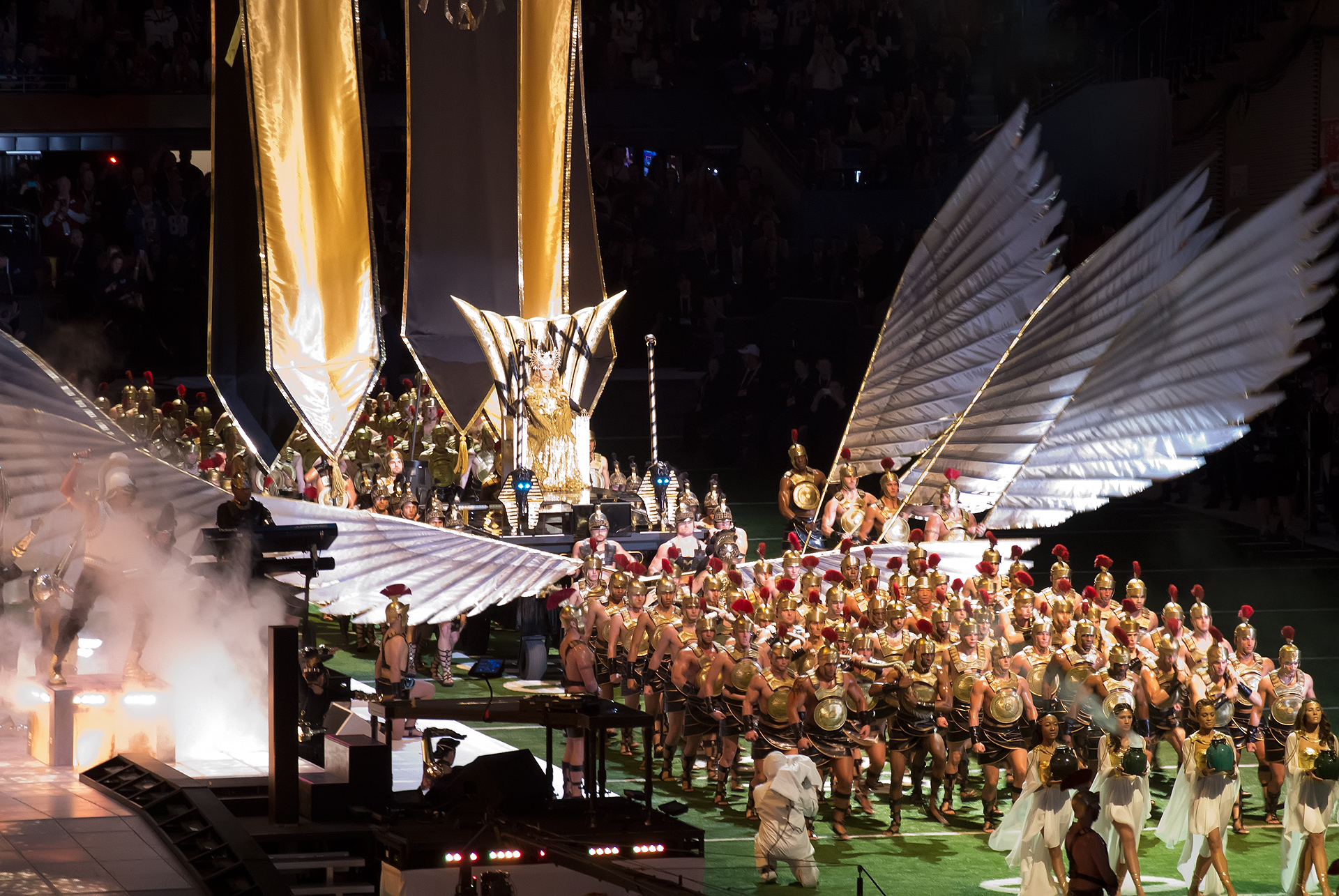
Madonna arrives for the halftime show.

Word had leaked as early as October 2011 that Madonna would be the performer for the Super Bowl halftime show, with M.I.A. and Nicki Minaj performing as well; all three are featured on Madonna's new single "Give Me All Your Luvin'" which was performed as part of the show. The league confirmed Madonna as the performer on December 4. Other collaborators on the project included LMFAO, Cee Lo Green, long time Madonna collaborator Jamie King, Cirque du Soleil, and Moment Factory.

The setlist included an Egyptian-themed "Vogue" with costumes by Givenchy, a medley of Madonna's "Music" and LMFAO's two largest hits ("Party Rock Anthem" and "Sexy and I Know It", with the LMFAO singers remaining fully clothed, unlike in the latter song's music video), followed by her then-current single "Give Me All Your Luvin'", excerpts from "Open Your Heart" and "Express Yourself" (in a duet with Green), and the finale, "Like a Prayer", also featuring Green. Green and Shelton (who sang "America the Beautiful" as part of the pregame show) are both judges on the NBC TV series The Voice, which the network broadcast after the game.

M.I.A. came under controversy for giving the middle finger during the performance of "Give Me All Your Luvin'", which was caught by the broadcast feed. The gesture was given when she appeared to sing "I don't give a shit", although it was hard to hear clearly if the expletive was said, stopped short, or cut off, as the censor unsuccessfully tried to blur the screen to cover the gesture.

The show broke the record for the most viewed Super Bowl halftime show ever, defeating Michael Jackson's previous record, with 114 million viewers throughout the world.

== Game summary ==
=== First quarter ===
The Patriots won the coin toss and deferred. This ended a stretch of 14 consecutive Super Bowls in which the NFC team won the coin toss.

The Giants opened the game with a drive to the Patriots' 33-yard line, threatening to score first. After quarterback Eli Manning completed a 19-yard pass to wide receiver Hakeem Nicks, the Patriots' defense stepped up to prevent a score. First, defensive end Brandon Deaderick sacked Manning for a 2-yard loss, then running back Ahmad Bradshaw was tackled behind the line of scrimmage on a blitz by cornerback Kyle Arrington. On third down, defensive end Mark Anderson sacked Manning for a 6-yard loss, pushing the Giants out of field goal range and forcing them to punt.

The Giants got a boost from punter Steve Weatherford, whose 36-yard kick pinned the Patriots back at their own 6-yard line. On the Patriots' first offensive play of the game, quarterback Tom Brady attempted a play action pass, but a heavy rush from defensive end Justin Tuck forced Brady to throw deep into the middle of the field, with no receiver anywhere near it. Brady was flagged for intentional grounding, and since he was in the end zone when he threw the pass, the play resulted in a safety, giving the Giants an early 2–0 lead. It was the first safety in a Super Bowl since the Arizona Cardinals scored one in Super Bowl XLIII. After receiving the free kick, the Giants drove 78 yards in 9 plays. Aided by a key 24-yard run by Bradshaw, the Giants increased their lead to 9–0 on Manning's 2-yard touchdown pass to wide receiver Victor Cruz.

On the Patriots' following drive, Brady completed passes to running back BenJarvus Green-Ellis for 7 yards and wide receiver Deion Branch for 15, while wide receiver Wes Welker picked up 29 yards on a reception and a run on a reverse, moving the ball to the Giants' 17-yard line.

=== Second quarter ===
The Giants managed to stop the drive at their own 11-yard line, but Stephen Gostkowski kicked a 29-yard field goal to cut the Patriots' deficit to 9–3 early in the second quarter.

After the next three possessions resulted in punts, Weatherford's 51-yard punt gave the Patriots possession on their 2-yard line with 4:03 left in the half. However, this punt did not affect the Patriots, as they stormed 96 yards down the field in 14 plays, tying the record for the longest drive in Super Bowl history. Brady completed a 20-yard pass to tight end Rob Gronkowski, then followed it up with four consecutive completions to tight end Aaron Hernandez for a total gain of 38 yards. The drive ended with Brady's 4-yard touchdown pass to running back Danny Woodhead, giving the Patriots their first lead of the game, 10–9, at halftime.

=== Third quarter ===
The Patriots took the second half kickoff and started out strong; Brady completed a 21-yard pass to wide receiver Chad Johnson (his only reception of the postseason and Brady's longest pass of the game), and a reception and two runs by Green-Ellis gained 29 yards to the Giants' 24-yard line. Brady eventually finished the eight-play, 79-yard drive with a 12-yard touchdown pass to Hernandez, increasing the Patriots' lead to 17–9.

Starting their first drive of the half from their own 35-yard line after wide receiver Jerrel Jernigan's 34-yard kickoff return, aided by Manning's two completions to Nicks for 19 yards, the Giants reached the Patriots' 20-yard line, where kicker Lawrence Tynes made a 38-yard field goal, cutting their deficit to 17–12.

On the Patriots' next drive, the Giants forced a three-and-out, and safety Will Blackmon returned Zoltán Meskó's 43-yard punt 10 yards to the Patriots' 47-yard line. The Giants subsequently drove back into scoring range on a drive that utilized several different players, including a 12-yard reception by seldom used tight end Bear Pascoe to reach the Patriots' 9-yard line. On third down, however, a sack by Anderson and linebacker Rob Ninkovich forced the Giants to settle for a 33-yard field goal by Tynes, cutting the score to 17–15 with 35 seconds left in the third quarter.

=== Fourth quarter ===
On the second play of the fourth quarter, the game's only turnover occurred when Giants linebacker Chase Blackburn stepped in front of Gronkowski and picked off a deep Brady pass at the Giants' 8-yard line. The Giants then drove to the Patriots' 43-yard line, but were stopped there and had to punt. The Patriots took the ball back at their own 8-yard line with less than 10 minutes left in the game. After Brady completed four consecutive passes for 34 yards to reach the Giants' 44-yard line, he threw to a wide-open Welker, but his pass was high and Welker was unable to reel it in while falling to the ground, crucially preventing a huge gain. Brady's next pass was incomplete, and the Patriots were forced to punt, after which Brady's wife supermodel Gisele Bündchen famously blamed Welker, saying her husband could not both "[T]hrow and catch the ball." The television footage of the game showed Patriots head coach Bill Belichick exhorting his defense to focus on stopping Cruz and Nicks, and to force the Giants to go to secondary options Mario Manningham and Pascoe.

The Giants took possession from their own 12-yard line with 3:46 left in the game and one timeout. On the first play, in what would end up being one of the key plays of the game, Manning completed a deep pass along the left sideline to Manningham for a 38-yard gain to midfield (the longest play from scrimmage in the game), which would later draw comparisons to his pass to David Tyree in Super Bowl XLII. Belichick challenged the catch, but the call on the field stood and it cost him the Patriots' first timeout. Two more completions from Manning to Manningham gained another 18 yards. Manning then completed a 14-yard pass to Nicks on the Patriots' 18-yard line at the two-minute warning. Three plays later, the Patriots called their second timeout with 1:03 left after Bradshaw's 1-yard run set up 2nd-and-goal on the 6-yard line.

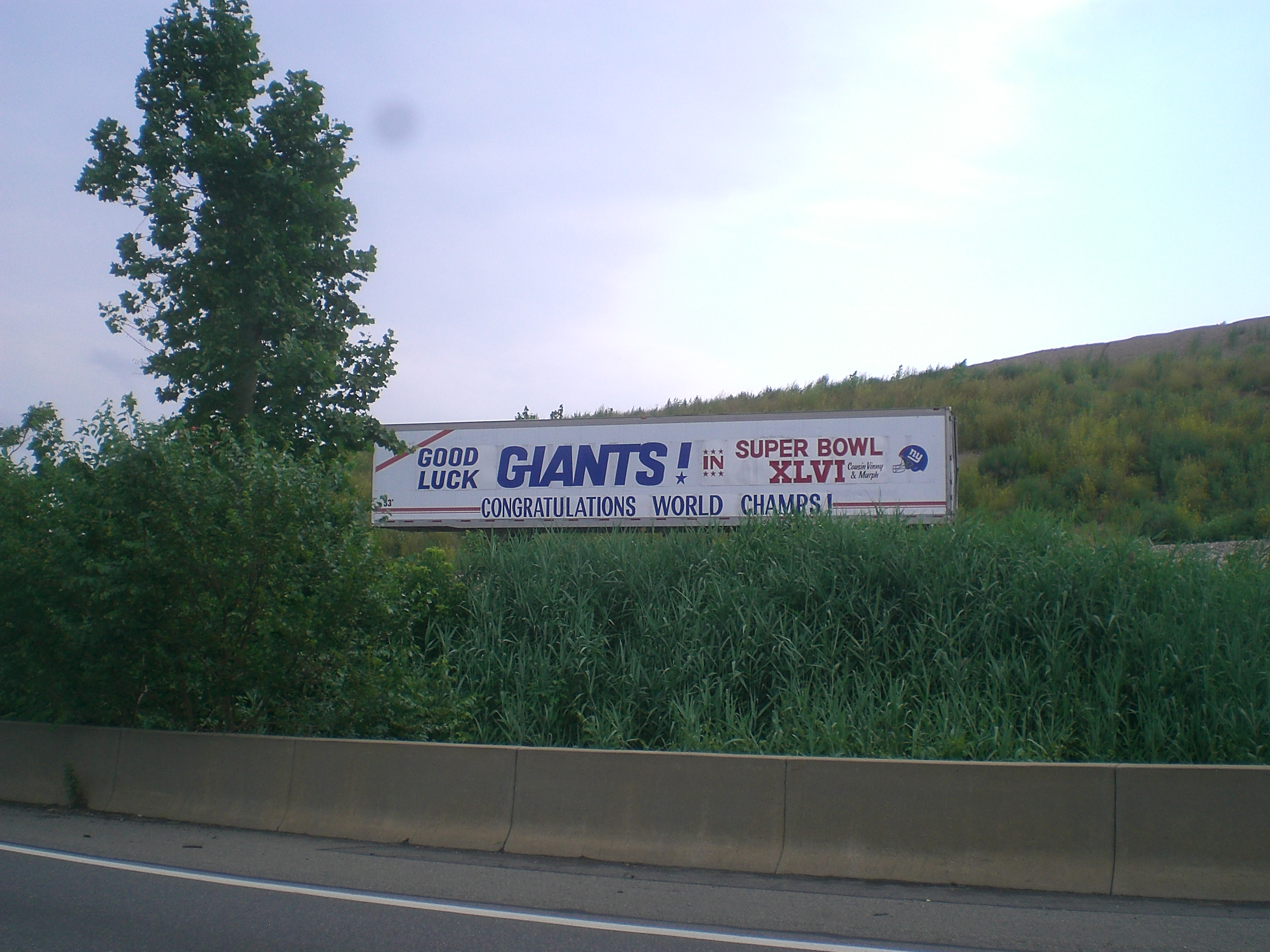
Trailer honoring the Giants for winning the Super Bowl. The trailer was located on the New Jersey Turnpike near Exit 14.

On the second down play, which Sports Illustrated later called "perhaps the strangest play in Super Bowl history", Bradshaw's path to the end zone was clear as the Patriots chose to let him score. Once he realized what was happening, Bradshaw tried to stop running at the 1-yard line, but his forward momentum carried him over the goal line and the Giants took the lead on the uncontested touchdown run. The intentionally surrendered touchdown gave the Patriots 57 seconds to mount a game-winning drive, and they trailed 21–17 after Giants running back DJ Ware was stopped on the two-point conversion attempt.

The game's final drive began on the Patriots' 20-yard line. Brady's first two passes fell incomplete and then he was sacked by Tuck for a 6-yard loss on third down, bringing up 4th-and-16 and forcing the Patriots to use their final timeout. Facing heavy pressure in the pocket, Brady eluded defensive end Jason Pierre-Paul and linebacker Mathias Kiwanuka, then threw a 19-yard bullet to wide receiver Deion Branch, who ran out of bounds at the 33-yard line for a first down. An 11-yard completion from Brady to Hernandez advanced the ball to the Patriots' 44-yard line, followed by a twelve-men-on-the-field penalty against the Giants, which moved the ball to the Patriots' 49-yard line with nine seconds left. After an incomplete pass, Brady, on the game's final play, threw a Hail Mary pass intended for Hernandez in the end zone, but the ball was deflected by five Giants defenders. Gronkowski dove with outstretched arms toward the ball but was still a yard away when it hit the ground, giving the Giants their fourth Super Bowl title in franchise history. This was the most recent "big four" North American professional sports championship won by a New York City-based team until the New York Knicks won the NBA Finals in 2026.

=== Box score ===
Super Bowl XLVI: New York Giants 21, New England Patriots 17

Quarter	1	2	3	4	Total
Giants (NFC)	9	0	6	6	21
Patriots (AFC)	0	10	7	0	17

at Lucas Oil Stadium, Indianapolis, Indiana

- Date: February 5, 2012
- Game time: 6:30 p.m. EST
- Game weather: Played with roof closed, retractable roof stadium
- Game attendance: 68,658
- Referee: John Parry
- TV announcers (NBC): Al Michaels, Cris Collinsworth, Michele Tafoya
- Recap

Scoring summary

Quarter	Time	Drive			Team	Scoring information	Score	
Quarter	Time	Plays	Yards	TOP	Team	Scoring information	NYG	NE
1	8:52	—	—	—	NYG	Intentional grounding penalty on Tom Brady in the end zone for a safety	2	0
1	3:24	9	78	5:28	NYG	Victor Cruz 2-yard touchdown reception from Eli Manning, Lawrence Tynes kick good	9	0
2	13:48	10	60	4:36	NE	29-yard field goal by Stephen Gostkowski	9	3
2	0:08	14	96	3:55	NE	Danny Woodhead 4-yard touchdown reception from Brady, Gostkowski kick good	9	10
3	11:20	8	79	3:40	NE	Aaron Hernandez 12-yard touchdown reception from Brady, Gostkowski kick good	9	17
3	6:43	10	45	4:37	NYG	38-yard field goal by Tynes	12	17
3	0:35	9	33	5:01	NYG	33-yard field goal by Tynes	15	17
4	0:57	9	88	2:49	NYG	Ahmad Bradshaw 6-yard touchdown run, 2-point run no good	21	17
"TOP" = time of possession. For other American football terms, see Glossary of American football.							21	17

=== Statistical overview ===
For the Giants, Manning completed 30 of 40 passes for 296 yards, one touchdown, and no interceptions. Bradshaw was the top rusher of the game with 72 yards and a touchdown, also catching two passes for 19 yards. Nicks was the top receiver with 10 receptions for 109 yards. Blackburn, who had been cut by the Giants earlier in the season before being re-signed, had 6 total tackles and an interception. Tuck made 3 tackles and two sacks. For the Patriots, Brady completed 27 of 41 passes for 276 yards and two touchdowns, with one interception, becoming the first quarterback to throw a touchdown pass in five separate Super Bowls. His top target was tight end Aaron Hernandez, performing in a role similar to the one he played at Florida, catching 8 passes for 67 yards and one score. A 2010 4th-Round selection, Hernandez's stellar performance in the game would only add to the tragedy when his career was cut short by a self-destructive spiral into crime, resulting in his conviction in 2013 for the murder of Odin Lloyd. Fellow second-year tight end Rob Gronkowski, who came into Super Bowl XLVI battling a severe ankle injury, tallied 2 catches for 26 yards and Welker, despite the infamous drop, finished with 7 receptions for 60 yards and two carries for 21. Defensively, linebackers Jerod Mayo and Brandon Spikes each had 8 solo tackles, 3 assists, and a forced fumble.

With the win the Giants became the fifth team to win at least four Super Bowls, while the Patriots became the fourth to lose four. At the time, Brady had yet to win in Lucas Oil Stadium and had not won a game in Indianapolis since 2007, when the Patriots defeated the Indianapolis Colts on their way to a perfect regular season. Belichick dropped to 3–2 as a head coach in the Super Bowl, while Tom Coughlin won his second Super Bowl in as many tries. Some news organizations, among them The St. Louis Post-Dispatch, said that their victory made them NFL's version of the 2011 World Series champion St. Louis Cardinals, saying that these two championship teams that had been given the last rites by many near the end of the season, emerged as champions at the end. Eli Manning was the only quarterback to throw for more than 4,900 yards and win a Super Bowl in the same season until Patrick Mahomes threw for 5,250 yards and won Super Bowl LVII during the 2022 NFL season.

The Giants and Patriots became the 3rd and 4th teams (after the Oakland Raiders and Pittsburgh Steelers) to appear in Super Bowls in four different decades (both in the 1980s, 1990s, 2000s, and 2010s) and the second and third to appear in Super Bowls in four consecutive decades (joining the Pittsburgh Steelers). The Giants became the first and only team in Super Bowl history to win Super Bowls in four different decades (1986, 1990, 2007, 2011). Conversely, the Patriots became the first and only team in Super Bowl history to lose Super Bowls in four different decades (1985, 1996, 2007, 2011).

Dan Shaughnessy said in a piece in The Boston Globe about Boston on the loss to the Giants under the headline, "History Repeats": "Instead of celebrating a grand slam–championships in every major sport over a period of four years and four months–New Englanders are spitting out pieces of their broken luck, bracing for the avalanche of grief from the New Yorkers they envy so badly."

The Giants went into the half trailing 10–9. The Giants have trailed at halftime in all of their Super Bowl appearances, trailing 10–9 to the Broncos, 12–10 to the Bills, 10–0 to the Ravens, and 7–3 to the Patriots.

This would be the fourth time in the Giants' five Super Bowl appearances that they faced their AFC opponent earlier during the regular season. In every season in which the Giants have won the Super Bowl they have faced their AFC Super Bowl counterpart previously during the regular season.

The Giants are now 4–0 in Super Bowls in which Bill Belichick has been on the sidelines. Belichick was the Giants' defensive coordinator for their first two Super Bowl victories, and the opposing head coach in their last two. Three of the Giants' victories have come against AFC East teams, with the Giants having defeated the Buffalo Bills and Patriots twice.

The Giants continued their winning streak in road playoff games with their win in Super Bowl XLVI. The team won every playoff game they played away from their home stadium (Giants Stadium and MetLife Stadium) from 2007 to 2011. Prior to this run, last time the Giants were defeated in a game away from the Meadowlands was in 2006, when they were defeated by the Philadelphia Eagles in the Wild Card round. This streak came to an end in the 2016–17 NFL playoffs, where the Giants were defeated 38–13 by the Green Bay Packers at Lambeau Field in the Wild Card round. Two of the Giants' road playoff victories during this streak occurred at Lambeau.

This was the second Super Bowl, after Super Bowl X, resulting in a final score of 21–17 with the winning score including a safety and a missed extra point as part of its 21-point total (although in this case it was a failed 2-point attempt while in the earlier case it was a blocked kick).

This was the 5th set of teams to have a rematch in Super Bowl history and overall the 6th rematch. The others were the Miami Dolphins and Washington Redskins, who met in Super Bowl VII and Super Bowl XVII; the Dallas Cowboys and Pittsburgh Steelers, who met in Super Bowl X, Super Bowl XIII, and Super Bowl XXX and are the only teams to meet in the Super Bowl more than twice; the San Francisco 49ers and Cincinnati Bengals, who met in Super Bowl XVI and Super Bowl XXIII; and the Cowboys and Buffalo Bills, who met in Super Bowl XXVII and Super Bowl XXVIII and are the only teams to face each other in two consecutive Super Bowls; and later the Patriots and the Philadelphia Eagles becoming the 6th set of teams to have a rematch in Super Bowl history and 7th overall, meeting in Super Bowl LII after previously meeting in Super Bowl XXXIX.

== Final statistics ==
Sources: NFL.com Super Bowl XLVI, Super Bowl XLVI Play Finder NYG, Super Bowl XLVI Play Finder NE, The Football Database Super Bowl XLVI

=== Statistical comparison ===
	New York Giants	New England Patriots
First downs	26	21
First downs rushing	7	6
First downs passing	18	15
First downs penalty	1	0
Third down efficiency	5/11	6/12
Fourth down efficiency	0/0	1/1
Net yards rushing	114	83
Rushing attempts	28	19
Yards per rush	4.1	4.4
Passing – Completions-attempts	30/40	27/41
Times sacked-total yards	3–14	2–10
Interceptions thrown	0	1
Net yards passing	282	266
Total net yards	396	349
Punt returns-total yards	1–10	0–0
Kickoff returns-total yards	4–75	3–73
Interceptions-total return yards	1–0	0–0
Punts-average yardage	4–40.8	3–41.0
Fumbles-lost	2–0	0–0
Penalties-yards	4–24	5–28
Time of possession	37:05	22:55
Turnovers	0	1

Records set
Oldest Winning Head Coach	65	Tom Coughlin (surpassed by Bill Belichick in Super Bowl LIII)
Most Consecutive Completions To Start Game	9	Eli Manning
Most Consecutive Completions	16	Tom Brady
Most Passing Yards, Career	1,277 yards	Tom Brady
Most Passes, Career	197	Tom Brady
Most Completions, Career	127	Tom Brady
Most Punts Inside 10-yard-line, Game	3	Steve Weatherford (New York Giants)
Most First Downs Passing, Both Teams	33	New York Giants 18, New England 15
Records tied
Most Games Started	5	Tom Brady & Matt Light (New England)
Longest Touchdown Drive	96 yards	New England
Fewest Turnovers, Game, Team	0	New York Giants
Most Safeties, Game, Team	1	New York Giants
Fewest Touchdowns Rushing, Game	0	New England
Fewest Passes Had Intercepted, Game	0	New York Giants
Fewest First Downs By Penalty, Game	0	New England
Fewest Punt Returns, Game	0	New England
Fewest Fumbles, Game	0	New England
Fewest Fumbles Lost, Both Teams	0	New York Giants 0, New England 0

=== Individual statistics ===
Giants passing
	C/ATT^{1}	Yds	TD	INT	Rating
Eli Manning	30/40	296	1	0	103.8
Giants rushing
	Car^{2}	Yds	TD	LG^{3}	Yds/Car
Ahmad Bradshaw	17	72	1	24	4.24
Brandon Jacobs	9	37	0	11	4.11
DJ Ware	1	6	0	6	6.00
Eli Manning	1	–1	0	–1	–1.00
Giants receiving
	Rec^{4}	Yds	TD	LG^{3}	Target^{5}
Hakeem Nicks	10	109	0	19	13
Mario Manningham	5	73	0	38	9
Bear Pascoe	4	33	0	12	4
Victor Cruz	4	25	1	8	4
Ahmad Bradshaw	2	19	0	11	3
Henry Hynoski	2	19	0	13	2
Jake Ballard	2	10	0	9	3
DJ Ware	1	8	0	8	1
Brandon Jacobs	0	0	0	0	1

Patriots passing
	C/ATT^{1}	Yds	TD	INT	Rating
Tom Brady	27/41	276	2	1	91.1
Patriots rushing
	Car^{2}	Yds	TD	LG^{3}	Yds/Car
BenJarvus Green-Ellis	10	44	0	17	4.40
Wes Welker	2	21	0	11	10.50
Danny Woodhead	7	18	0	6	2.57
Patriots receiving
	Rec^{4}	Yds	TD	LG^{3}	Target^{5}
Aaron Hernandez	8	67	1	12	14
Wes Welker	7	60	0	19	8
Danny Woodhead	4	42	1	19	4
Deion Branch	3	45	0	19	6
Rob Gronkowski	2	26	0	20	3
BenJarvus Green-Ellis	2	15	0	8	3
Chad Ochocinco	1	21	0	21	1

^{1}Completions/attempts ^{2}Carries ^{3}Long gain ^{4}Receptions ^{5}Times targeted

== Starting lineups ==
New York	Position	Position	New England
Offense
Victor Cruz	WR		Wes Welker
David Diehl	LT		Matt Light
Kevin Boothe	LG		Logan Mankins
David Baas	C		Dan Connolly
Chris Snee	RG		Brian Waters
Kareem McKenzie	RT		Nate Solder
Jake Ballard	TE		Rob Gronkowski
Hakeem Nicks	WR		Deion Branch
Eli Manning	QB		Tom Brady
Henry Hynoski	FB	TE	Aaron Hernandez
Ahmad Bradshaw	RB		BenJarvus Green-Ellis
Defense
Justin Tuck	LE	LB	Tracy White
Linval Joseph	LDT	DT	Vince Wilfork
Chris Canty	RDT	DT	Kyle Love
Jason Pierre-Paul	RE	DL	Brandon Deaderick
Chase Blackburn	MLB	LB	Rob Ninkovich
Michael Boley	WLB	LB	Jerod Mayo
Corey Webster	LCB	LB	Brandon Spikes
Aaron Ross	RCB	LCB	Devin McCourty
Kenny Phillips	SS	RCB	Kyle Arrington
Antrel Rolle	FS	S	James Ihedigbo
Deon Grant	S		Patrick Chung

== Officials ==
- Referee – John Parry
- Umpire – Carl Paganelli
- Head linesman – Tom Stabile
- Line judge – Gary Arthur
- Field judge – Gary Cavaletto
- Side judge – Laird Hayes
- Back judge – Tony Steratore
- Alternate referee - Alberto Riveron
- Alternate umpire - Bill Schuster
- Alternate flank - Wayne Mackie
- Alternate deep - Don Carlsen
- Alternate back judge - Greg Wilson

This was the last game officials wore the traditional white knickers. Beginning the next season, officials wore the full-length black pants introduced in 2006 for cold-weather games full-time.
