= Murder of Odin Lloyd =

2013 murder in North Attleborough, Massachusetts

- Lloyd in an undated photo
- Location: North Attleborough, Massachusetts, U.S.
- Date: June 17, 2013
- Attack type: Murder by shooting
- Perpetrators: Aaron Hernandez; Carlos Ortiz; Ernest Wallace
- Motive: Unknown, possibly a loss of trust
- Coroner: Massachusetts Medical Examiner
- Charges: Hernandez, Ortiz, Wallace: First-degree murder; Ortiz, Wallace: Accessory to murder after-the-fact; Hernandez: Carrying a firearm without a license; Possessing a large-capacity firearm (2 counts); Possessing a firearm without a firearm identification card (2 counts)
- Verdict: Hernandez; Guilty on all counts Wallace; Not guilty of first-degree murder Guilty of accessory to murder after-the-fact Ortiz; Pleaded guilty to accessory to murder after-the-fact (murder charge dropped after plea deal)
- Sentence: Hernandez; Life in prison without the possibility of parole Wallace, Ortiz; 4½ to 7 years in prison

Odin Leonardo John Lloyd (November 14, 1985 – June 17, 2013) was a semi-professional American football player. Lloyd was murdered by Aaron Hernandez, a tight end for the New England Patriots of the National Football League (NFL), in North Attleborough, Massachusetts, on June 17, 2013. His death made international headlines following Hernandez's association with the investigation as a suspect. Lloyd had been a linebacker for a New England Football League (NEFL) semi-professional football team, the Boston Bandits, since 2007.

Hernandez was arrested on June 26, 2013, and charged with the murder. Ninety minutes after his arrest, Hernandez was released by the Patriots. Police also arrested two other men in connection with Lloyd's death: Carlos Ortiz on June 27, 2013, and Ernest Wallace on June 28, 2013. Prosecutors say both men were with Hernandez when they drove to the location of the murder. On August 22, 2013, Hernandez was indicted by a grand jury for the murder of Odin Lloyd. Nearly eight months later, Ortiz and Wallace were also indicted for the murder.

On April 15, 2015, Hernandez was found guilty of first-degree murder, as well as five weapon charges, which required a mandatory sentence of life in prison without the possibility of parole. On May 12, 2016, Wallace was acquitted of first-degree murder of Lloyd, but was convicted of being an accessory after the fact of the crime; he was sentenced to serve four and a half to seven years in prison. On June 27, 2016, Ortiz changed his 'not guilty' plea and pleaded guilty to accessory after the fact. In exchange for his plea, prosecutors dropped the murder charge against Ortiz. He was also sentenced to serve four and a half to seven years in prison.

On April 14, 2017, Hernandez was acquitted on two separate murder charges for the 2012 double homicide of Daniel de Abreu and Safiro Furtado. Five days later, on April 19, 2017, at 3:05 am, Hernandez was found dead in his prison cell by correctional officers after apparently hanging himself with a bedsheet. By killing himself before the appeal of his case could be completed, Hernandez's murder conviction was vacated, technically returning him to a state of innocent until proven guilty. The court's decision to vacate was appealed by the prosecutors and the Lloyd family's attorneys. In March 2019, the Massachusetts Supreme Judicial Court overturned the entire doctrine of abatement ab initio, thus reinstating his original murder conviction.

== Background ==
Odin Leonardo John Lloyd was born in Saint Croix in the U.S. Virgin Islands and spent a few years with his family in Antigua, before they moved to the Dorchester section of Boston. He was the first-born child and only son of Ursula Ward. He played football at John D. O'Bryant School of Mathematics & Science in Roxbury, Boston and enrolled at Delaware State University where he planned to play college football for the Hornets but left within days of arriving on campus. Lloyd was survived by his sisters, Olivia and Shaquilla Thibou, and a maternal uncle, who said that he had last seen Lloyd on the Sunday before his death. A neighbor, who described himself as "a regular at a nearby park where Lloyd would go to work out—not hang out," described Lloyd as usually keeping to himself. Citing Lloyd's physical condition, the neighbor said, "Of everybody on this street, he was the one who could take care of himself...So there had to be some shaky stuff if he was the guy killed." Lloyd was a linebacker for the Boston Bandits, a semi-pro football team. He had played for the team since 2007. At the time of his death, Odin Lloyd was dating Shaneah Jenkins, sister of the fiancée of Aaron Hernandez.

== Death and investigation ==
On June 17, 2013, Lloyd was shot and killed in an industrial park located one mile from Hernandez's house.

On June 16, the night before Lloyd's death, Hernandez texted two friends from his hometown of Bristol, Connecticut asking them to come to Massachusetts, writing, "You can't trust anyone anymore." In the early morning hours of June 17, Lloyd was riding as a passenger in Hernandez's car; he texted his sister, "Did you see who I am with?" and when his sister responded, he replied, "NFL." Lloyd's last text to his sister read, "Just so you know." His sister later said that she had thought he was bragging. Based on an upheld defendant's attorney objection, the court dismissed the texts as testimony, saying there was insufficient evidence that Lloyd feared for his life.

Prosecutors reportedly said that Lloyd and Hernandez were in contact just 10 hours before his death, concerning a bag of marijuana. Furthermore, keys to a car that had been rented by Hernandez were allegedly found in Lloyd's pocket. Prosecutors believe Lloyd recently said something to Hernandez that destroyed his trust, giving Hernandez a motive to kill. Prosecutors also stated how bubble gum that was purchased by Hernandez was found stuck to a gun-shell casing at the scene, that was similar to the one that Lloyd was shot with and the DNA matched Hernandez, as well as found in the rental car that was under Hernandez's name. The prosecution testified that crime scene investigators were able to find shoe tracks at the crime scene that made the same impression of shoes worn by Hernandez the same night according to surveillance footage.

On June 18, 2013, police searched Hernandez's house in North Attleborough for several hours. The Massachusetts State Police obtained a search warrant after evidence surfaced that Hernandez had intentionally destroyed his home security system. A cell phone belonging to Hernandez was turned over to police "in pieces", and Hernandez allegedly hired a "team of house cleaners" the same day Lloyd's body was discovered, raising additional suspicion. In the wake of Lloyd's death, the Boston Bandits released a statement: "The Bandits would like to extend our deepest condolences to Odin's family and his loved ones. He will be deeply missed by his football family but we promise to persevere and play the game that Odin loved in his honor" and "the Boston Bandits are cooperating with local and state police in their efforts to identify the person responsible for Odin Lloyd's death".

== Charges and trial ==
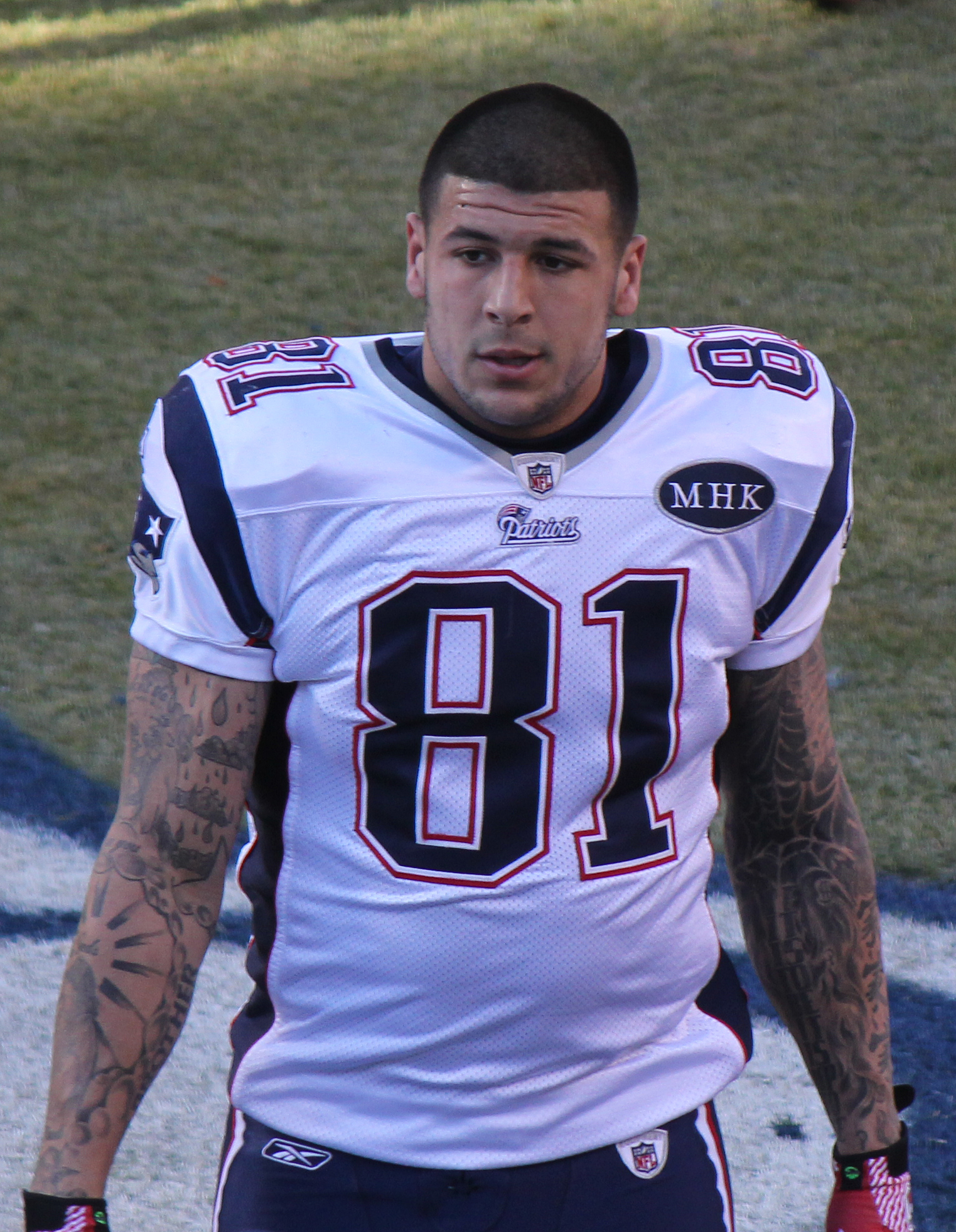
Aaron Hernandez was convicted of Lloyd's murder.

On June 26, 2013, Hernandez was arrested at his home and charged with first-degree murder, one count of carrying a firearm without a license, two counts of possessing a large-capacity firearm, and two counts of possessing a firearm without a firearm identification card. The first-degree murder charge required a mandatory sentence of life in prison without the possibility of parole, as Massachusetts outlawed the death penalty in 1984. Hernandez was held without bail at the Bristol County, Massachusetts Jail and House of Correction. On June 27 and 28, 2013, respectively, Carlos Ortiz and Ernest Wallace were also arrested in connection with Lloyd's death. Ortiz told police that Hernandez had rented an apartment secretly in Franklin, Massachusetts. As reported by the Associated Press, a subsequent search of the apartment "turned up ammunition and clothing that police believe could be evidence in the murder case against him". Ortiz was held on $500,000 bail. On September 27, 2013, Ortiz was indicted on a single count of accessory to murder after the fact in the killing of Lloyd. In addition, Hernandez's fiancée, Shayanna Jenkins, and his cousin, Tanya Cummings Singleton, were charged as accessories to murder for their suspected involvement in assisting Hernandez after he killed Lloyd. On August 22, 2013, Hernandez was indicted by a grand jury for the murder of Odin Lloyd.

On January 29, 2015, the trial began in Fall River, Massachusetts with opening statements by prosecuting attorney Patrick Bomberg and defense attorney Michael Fee. Judge E. Susan Garsh presided. The trial was expected to take about ten weeks. The trial was delayed on a few occasions as a result of the unprecedented snowfall in Greater Boston. In opening statements, prosecutors said Hernandez's DNA was found at the murder scene. On April 9, 2015, a photographer for NBC affiliate WHDH (TV) was banned from reporting and taking pictures at the trial as one of their news trucks had followed the jury van the previous day. In closing statements, in light of substantial physical evidence provided by the prosecution, the defense admitted to Hernandez being present during the murder, but downplayed his role. Defense said that he was an unwilling participant who "was a 23-year-old kid who witnessed something. A shocking killing, committed by someone he knew. He really didn't know what to do. So he just put one foot in front of the other."

On April 15, 2015, Hernandez was convicted of first-degree murder and all weapons charges, and sentenced to life in prison without the possibility of parole. Immediately following the conviction, Hernandez was temporarily transferred to the Massachusetts Correctional Institution – Cedar Junction, a maximum-security intake facility to begin serving his sentence; it is located 1.5 miles from Gillette Stadium, where he formerly played. He was transferred to serve the remainder of his life sentence at the Souza-Baranowski Correctional Center, a maximum-security facility adjacent to the medium-security Massachusetts Correctional Institution – Shirley. Wallace was acquitted of charges of murder on May 12, 2016, but convicted of being an accessory after the fact. He was sentenced to four-and-a-half to seven years in prison.

On April 19, 2017, at around 3:05 am, Hernandez was found hanging in his prison cell. His death was ruled a suicide. Hernandez's attorneys successfully requested that his murder conviction be vacated due to the legal principle of abatement ab initio: if a convicted criminal has not exhausted all legal appeals at the time of his death, a guilty verdict may be officially vacated. His conviction was reinstated in 2019 following an appeal from prosecutors and the Lloyd family.

After being convicted in the Lloyd murder, Hernandez was accused of the 2012 shooting deaths of Boston residents Daniel Jorge Correia de Abreu and Safiro Teixeira Furtado. Attorney Jose Baez represented Hernandez in the murder trial, which resulted in a not guilty verdict. Baez wrote in his 2018 book Unnecessary Roughness that he and Hernandez planned an appeal in the Lloyd case. Baez believed Hernandez made poor choices in associating with criminals, but was not a murderer. He noted that Hernandez did not flee the area after the Lloyd murder and was compliant with every police interview and warrant before his arrest. Baez contended an appeal had a strong chance of success, given what he characterized as weaknesses in the prosecution cases that were overlooked by the initial lawyers and Judge Garsh's comments during a bail hearing that Hernandez appeared to be guilty (a possible violation of presumption of innocence).

== Timeline of events ==
- July 16, 2012 – Daniel de Abreu and Safiro Furtado are killed by gunshots fired into their vehicle in Boston's South End after leaving Cure Nightclub. Hernandez was later indicted for these murders, but acquitted at trial in April 2017.
- February 13, 2013 – After leaving a strip club in Miami, Hernandez allegedly shot friend and drug dealer Alexander Bradley in the forehead, and dumped him in an industrial park off I-95 near Riviera Beach, in Palm Beach County, Florida. Bradley survived but lost his right eye. He filed a civil lawsuit against Hernandez for the shooting. Prosecutors later claimed the incident was due to an argument over Bradley's knowledge of the 2012 homicides. In May 2015 Hernandez was indicted on witness intimidation charges in the Bradley shooting.
- June 14, 2013 – Lloyd and Hernandez went together to Rumor Nightclub in Boston. A witness claimed Hernandez appeared to be upset at Lloyd in the club that night and stormed out. Prosecutors suggested that Hernandez may have been upset at Lloyd for speaking to patrons associated with the victims in the 2012 shootings.
- June 16, 2013 – At approximately 9:30 pm, Hernandez text messaged his friend, Ernest Wallace, asking him to drive up to North Attleborough, Massachusetts, along with Carlos Ortiz, from his home in Bristol, Connecticut.
- June 17, 2013 – At 2:33 am, surveillance footage shows Odin Lloyd leaving his home in the South End of Boston and getting into a silver Nissan Altima with Hernandez, Wallace, and Ortiz.
- June 17, 2013 – 3:07 to 3:23 am, Lloyd sent his last text messages, to his sister Shaquilla Thibou. They read: "U saw who I'm with."; "hello"; "Nfl."; and "just so you know.".
- June 17, 2013 – Around 3:25 am, surveillance camera footage shows a car driving toward a secluded gravel pit in an industrial area on John Dietsch Boulevard in North Attleborough. Approximately four minutes later, a car is shown driving back. Police say that Lloyd was fatally shot during the period in between.
- June 17, 2013 – Around 5:30 pm, a jogger taking a shortcut home discovered a body in a gravel pit on John Dietsch Boulevard. Later in the evening, the news broke that a man had been murdered about 1 mile from Hernandez's North Attleborough, Massachusetts home.
- June 18, 2013 – Hernandez was identified as playing a role in the murder of the man, later revealed to be Odin Lloyd.
- June 26, 2013 – Hernandez was arrested at his home after an arrest warrant was issued for him the previous day. He was released by the New England Patriots after his arrest. He was charged with first-degree murder.
- June 27–28, 2013 – Two other men, Carlos Ortiz and Ernest Wallace, are arrested in connection to Lloyd's death. A silver Toyota 4Runner later implicated in the 2012 double shooting is found in the house of Hernandez's cousin, Tanya Singleton, as police execute a search warrant in the Lloyd murder.
- August 22, 2013 – Hernandez is indicted on the charge of first-degree murder.
- September 6, 2013 – Hernandez is arraigned and pleads not guilty to murder.
- September 27, 2013 – Ortiz and Singleton are indicted on accessory charges in connection with Lloyd's death. Shayanna Jenkins is indicted for perjury.
- April 11, 2014 – Ortiz and Wallace charged with first-degree murder in new indictment.
- May 15, 2014 – Hernandez is indicted on murder charges for the killings of Abreu and Furtado.
- April 15, 2015 – Hernandez is convicted of first-degree murder of Lloyd and sentenced to life in prison without the possibility of parole.
- May 15, 2015 – Perjury charges dismissed against Shayanna Jenkins.
- May 12, 2016 – Wallace is acquitted of first-degree murder, but convicted of being an accessory after the fact of the crime; he is sentenced to four-and-a-half years to seven years in prison.
- June 27, 2016 – Ortiz changed his not guilty plea and pleaded guilty to accessory after the fact; he is sentenced to serve four-and-a-half to seven years in prison.
- April 19, 2017 – Hernandez was found dead in his prison cell by correctional officers after apparently hanging himself with a bedsheet.
- May 9, 2017 – Massachusetts Superior Court vacates Hernandez' murder conviction, due to the legal principle of abatement ab initio.
- March 13, 2019 – The Massachusetts Supreme Judicial Court reinstates Hernandez's conviction, ending ab initio in the state.

== See also ==
- American Sports Story
- History of the New England Patriots
- Killer Inside: The Mind of Aaron Hernandez, 2020 Netflix documentary series
- List of homicides in Massachusetts
- List of gridiron football players who died during their careers
