= Vacated judgment =

Voiding a previous legal judgment

A vacated judgment (also known as vacatur relief) is a legal judgment that legally voids a previous legal judgment. A vacated judgment is usually the result of the judgment of an appellate court, which overturns, reverses, or sets aside the judgment of a lower court. An appellate court may also vacate its own decisions. Rules of procedure may allow vacatur either at the request of a party (a motion to vacate) or sua sponte (at the court's initiative).

A vacated judgment may free the parties to civil litigation to re-litigate the issues subject to the vacated judgment.

Another means of having a vacated judgment would be if the defendant dies prior to all appeals being exhausted. Notable defendants having their convictions vacated under this include Kenneth Lay, the former chairman and CEO of Enron who died before sentencing, and Aaron Hernandez, a former football player who killed himself in jail before his appeals were exhausted. In the latter case, the vacatur was itself later overturned.

== United States ==
"Relief from judgment" of a United States District Court is governed by Rule 60 of the Federal Rules of Civil Procedure. The United States Court of Appeals for the Seventh Circuit has noted that a vacated judgment "place[s] the parties in the position of no trial having taken place at all; thus a vacated judgment is of no further force or effect."

One form of a vacatur in the United States legal system was established by United States v. Munsingwear, Inc. 340 U.S. 36 (1950), otherwise known as the Munsingwear vacatur. This approach is used when while a case is being held on appeal, whether at the Circuit Court or Supreme Court level, underlying factors make the case moot. The higher court will vacate the lower court's ruling, send the case back to the lower court, and have them render the case moot. Certain conditions must be met before the higher court can give a Munsingwear vacatur, generally allowing this vacatur to be used in three situations: in the matter of "happenstance" (such as the death of a litigant), through a settlement of the parties, or a unilateral action by the prevailing party in the lower court.

In a 2026 article for the Yale Law Journal, Benjamin B. Johnson writes that the Roberts court's usage of vacatur departs substantially from traditional usage of vacatur. The Roberts court "frequently employs vacatur to declare binding legal rules without issuing judgments, effectively circumventing traditional limits on judicial power."

== See also ==
- Central Park jogger case – 1989 crime in New York City
- Judgment – Evaluation of circumstances to make a decision
- Jury nullification – Type of jury verdict in criminal trials
- Kenneth Lay – Founder of Enron Corporation (1942–2006)
- Remand (court procedure) – Case referral back from higher court
- Abatement ab initio – Legal doctrine re death of defendant
- Expungement – Process by which a record of criminal conviction is destroyed or sealed
