= Killer Inside: The Mind of Aaron Hernandez =

2020 American true crime documentary

- Genre: True crime Documentary
- Directed by: Geno McDermott
- Starring: Aaron Hernandez; Susan Candiotti; Dan Wetzel; Ryan O'Callaghan; Chris Borland; Leigh Bodden; Jermaine Wiggins
- Composer: Jeremy Turner
- Country of origin: United States
- Original language: English
- No. of seasons: 1
- No. of episodes: 3

Production
- Executive producers: Dan Wetzel; Kevin Armstrong; Dan DiStefano; Angus Wall
- Producers: Jennifer Sofio Hall; Kent Kubena; Terry Leonard; Michael Steiner
- Editors: Alex Trudeau Viriato; Will Znidaric
- Running time: 200 minutes
- Production companies: Blackfin; Makemake

Original release
- Network: Netflix
- Release: January 15, 2020

Killer Inside: The Mind of Aaron Hernandez is a 2020 American true crime documentary series about convicted murderer and former professional American football player Aaron Hernandez. The three-part documentary explores his conviction for the murder of Odin Lloyd, other murder cases in which he was a suspect, and the factors in his life that shaped his behavior. It premiered on Netflix on January 15, 2020.

== Premise ==
Friends, officials, attorneys, journalists, and former teammates discuss the rise, fall, and eventual suicide of professional football player Aaron Hernandez (1989–2017), who was sentenced to life in prison after his conviction for the 2013 murder of Odin Lloyd.

== Production ==
In January 2017, director Geno McDermott met with journalists Dan Wetzel and Kevin Armstrong, who had both covered Hernandez's trial for the murder of Odin Lloyd and were writing a book about Hernandez. They began gathering interviews and other research for the documentary. After a year and a half, McDermott originally compiled a documentary film, My Perfect World: The Aaron Hernandez Story, that was shown at the DOC NYC film festival, but decided to make it a series after partnering with Netflix.

Information about Hernandez's sexuality was not included in the original film, as it was unsubstantiated. McDermott spent several days interviewing Dennis SanSoucie and his father for the documentary. They began investigating CTE following Hernandez's death, when his autopsy revealed a "severe" case of the degenerative brain disease. After Hernandez died by suicide, McDermott filed a FOIA request to obtain recordings of Hernandez's phone calls from jail and prison.

Hernandez's immediate family "very respectfully" declined to participate.

== Episodes ==
No.	Directed by	Original release date
1	Geno McDermott	January 15, 2020
Aaron Hernandez's life as a football star for the New England Patriots comes to a crashing halt following his arrest for the murder of his friend Odin Lloyd, a semi-pro football player. Journalists investigate Hernandez's early life growing up as a football star – the son of a local football legend turned abusive alcoholic – in Bristol, Connecticut. His former high school quarterback, Dennis Sansoucie, reveals he and Hernandez began a sexual relationship in the seventh grade until around their junior year in high school. Police investigating the Lloyd murder discover a silver SUV linking Hernandez to an unsolved 2012 double homicide of immigrants from Cape Verde in Boston.
2	Geno McDermott	January 15, 2020
After the unexpected death of his father in 2006, Hernandez surprises his family by playing for the Florida Gators, though his father and brother both played for the University of Connecticut. At Florida, Hernandez shines under coach Urban Meyer and quarterback Tim Tebow, but the pressure takes its toll on the teen star and red flags emerge. In 2010, 20-year-old Hernandez is drafted by the New England Patriots in the fourth round, despite the reputation he earned at Florida. Friends recall Hernandez exhibiting increasing paranoia. Meanwhile, prosecutors try Hernandez for Lloyd's murder in 2013 while investigating his role in the 2012 double homicide that baffled police.
3	Geno McDermott	January 15, 2020
Hernandez's paranoia leads to him to shooting Alexander Bradley, who survives and later testifies that he witnessed him killing Daniel de Abreu and Safiro Furtado outside a Boston nightclub in 2012. At the Odin Lloyd murder trial, Patriots owner Robert Kraft gives damning testimony that implicates Hernandez, who is found guilty of first-degree murder and sentenced to life in prison. Celebrity lawyer Jose Baez represents Hernandez in the double homicide case, and he is acquitted. Hernandez dies by suicide days after a Boston radio station outs him. The autopsy reveals severe CTE damage.

== Reception ==
=== Controversy ===
Attorney Jose Baez, who successfully defended Hernandez in his second murder trial, strongly criticized the documentary for including audio and photos of Hernandez's young daughter, Avielle. He also said too much time was spent discussing Hernandez's sexuality. Baez was interviewed for the documentary but said he regretted taking part.

=== Critical response ===
Killer Inside has received mostly positive reviews from critics. On Rotten Tomatoes, the series holds an approval rating of 75% based on 12 reviews, with an average rating of 7/10. The site's critical consensus reads: "Though it can't help but feel a little incomplete given the circumstances, The Killer Inside crafts a compelling overview of a series of tragic events." On Metacritic, the series has a weighted average score of 75 out of 100, based on 4 critics, indicating "generally favorable reviews".

Bob Hohler of The Boston Globe called it a "gripping look" at Hernandez's downfall, writing, "The finest video documentary yet on the Hernandez tragedy, Killer Inside is richly enhanced by archival footage."

Brian Lowry of CNN wrote that there are too many variables to provide a conclusive explanation for Hernandez's downfall, but praised the insight provided by his phone calls from prison, writing, "In terms of the presentation, the most illuminating wrinkle in Killer Inside involves having access to audio of phone calls Hernandez made from prison, providing modest insight about his post-arrest state of mind and relationships with those closest to him."

Ashlie D. Stevens of Salon praised the series for putting CTE in the spotlight, writing, "But perhaps more captivatingly, Killer Inside takes an objective look at chronic traumatic encephalopathy (CTE) – a neurodegenerative disease caused by head injuries – and how that changes or inhibits brain function and impulse control."
