= Durham v. United States (1971) =

- Supreme Court of the United States

Decided March 8, 1971
- Full case name: George Washington Durham, Petitioner, v. United States
- Citations: 401 U.S. 481 (more) 91 S. Ct. 858; 28 L. Ed. 2d 200

Case history
- Prior: Defendant convicted (D. Or.); reversed and remanded, 403 F.2d 190 (9th Cir. 1968); on remand, defendant convicted (D. Or.); affirmed, 419 F.2d 392 (9th Cir. 1969).

Holding
- The death of a criminal defendant during the pendency of direct review – including during the consideration of a petition for certiorari by the Supreme Court – abates the criminal case ab initio.

Court membership
- Chief Justice Warren E. Burger Associate Justices Hugo Black · William O. Douglas; John M. Harlan II · William J. Brennan Jr. Potter Stewart · Byron White; Thurgood Marshall · Harry Blackmun

Case opinions
- Majority: Per curiam, joined by Black, Douglas, Harlan, Brennan, and White
- Dissent: Marshall, joined by Burger, Stewart
- Dissent: Blackmun
- Overruled by
- Dove v. United States, 423 U.S. 325 (1976)

Durham v. United States, 401 U.S. 481 (1971), was a United States Supreme Court case in which the Court held that the death of a defendant accused of possessing a counterfeit bill pending a petition for certiorari before the Supreme Court on direct review of the criminal conviction will cause the Court to vacate the conviction. In a per curiam opinion, the Court wrote that "[t]he unanimity of the lower federal courts" in vacating criminal convictions when the defendant dies during direct review was "impressive" and accordingly vacated the original conviction.

In a one-sentence dissent, Justice Marshall, joined by Chief Justice Burger and Justice Stewart, wrote that the Court should dismiss only the petition for writ of certiorari rather than the entire conviction, writing:

MR. JUSTICE MARSHALL, whom THE CHIEF JUSTICE and MR. JUSTICE STEWART join, believes that the case should be disposed of as follows:
The petitioner having died while his petition for certiorari was pending before this Court, we dismiss the petition as moot and direct the Court of Appeals to note this action on its records.

Justice Blackmun wrote a separate dissenting opinion, noting that the petitioner had filed his petition out of time and that the Court should not dismiss a criminal conviction "which was unsuccessfully appealed throughout the entire appeal process to which the petitioner was entitled as of right".

The Court's decision in this case and other abatement cases has been criticized for allowing convicted criminal defendants to escape the collateral consequences of their convictions, including restitution orders.

The Court's decision in Durham was later overruled in Dove v. United States.
