= Aaron Hernandez =

American football player and murderer (1989–2017)

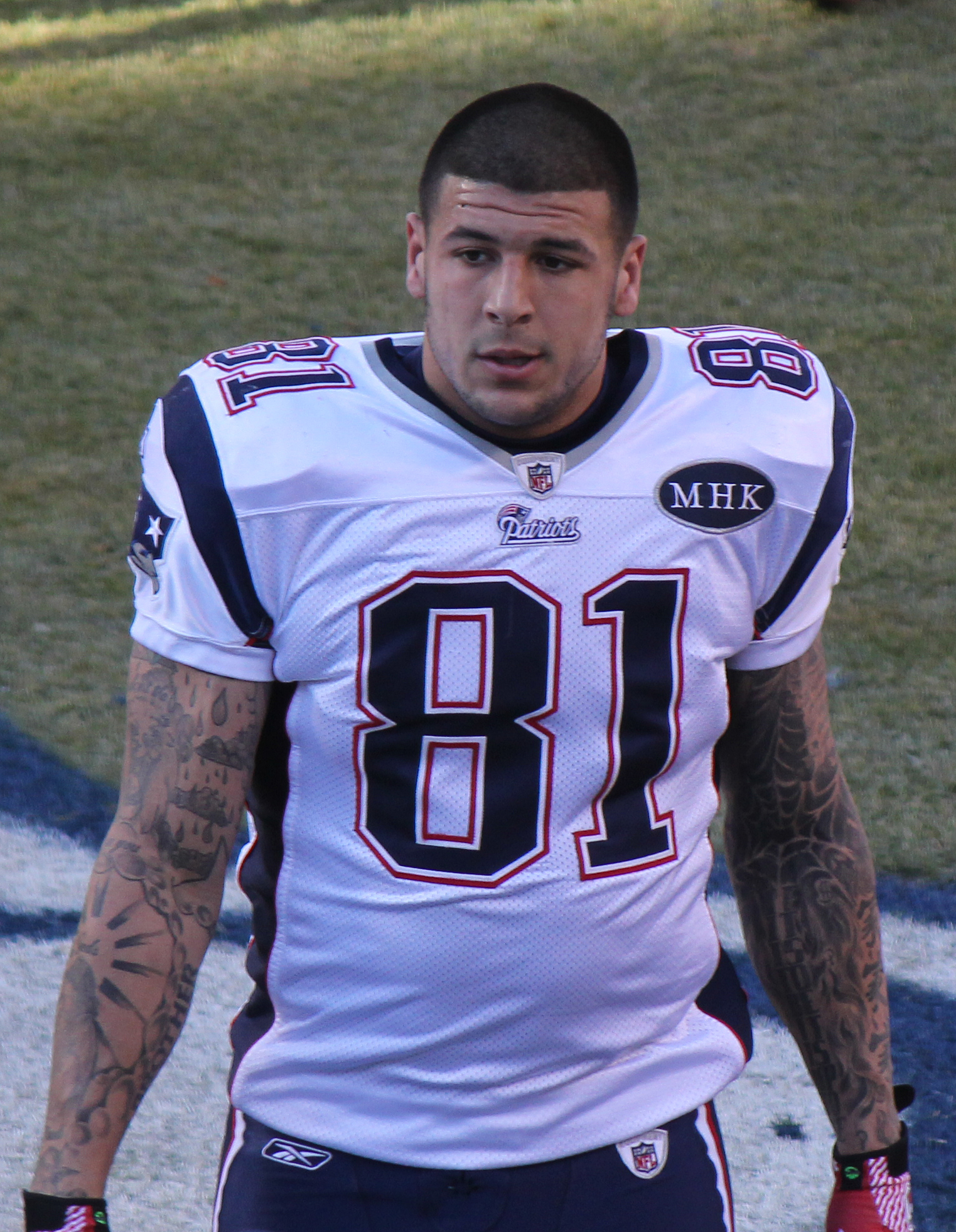
- Hernandez with the New England Patriots in 2011

No. 85, 81
- Position: Tight end

Personal information
- Born: November 6, 1989; Bristol, Connecticut, U.S.
- Died: April 19, 2017 (aged 27); Leominster, Massachusetts, U.S.
- Listed height: 6 ft 2 in (1.88 m)
- Listed weight: 250 lb (113 kg)

Career information
- High school: Bristol Central
- College: Florida (2007–2009)
- NFL draft: 2010: 4th round, 113th overall pick

Career history
- New England Patriots (2010–2012)

Awards and highlights
- BCS national champion (2008); John Mackey Award (2009); Ozzie Newsome Award (2009); First-team All-American (2009); First-team All-SEC (2009)

Career NFL statistics
- Receptions: 175
- Receiving yards: 1,956
- Receiving average: 11.2
- Receiving touchdowns: 18
- Stats at Pro Football Reference

Other information
- Criminal information
- Status: Deceased

Details
- Victims: Odin Lloyd
- Date: June 17, 2013
- Span of crimes: Potentially 2007 – 2013
- Killed: 1

Aaron Josef Hernandez (Note: Hernandez's proper full name was Aaron Josef Hernandez, but this has been misreported as Aaron Michael Hernandez.) (November 6, 1989 – April 19, 2017) was an American professional football tight end. He played in the National Football League (NFL) for three seasons with the New England Patriots until his arrest and conviction for the murder of Odin Lloyd.

Hernandez played college football for the Florida Gators, winning the 2009 BCS National Championship Game and receiving the John Mackey and Ozzie Newsome awards and first-team All-American honors the following season. Due to concerns towards his size and off the field incidents, he was not selected until the fourth round of the 2010 NFL draft by the Patriots. Alongside teammate Rob Gronkowski, Hernandez formed one of the league's most dominant tight end duos, becoming the first pair to score at least five touchdowns each in consecutive seasons for the same team. He also made an appearance in Super Bowl XLVI.

During the 2013 offseason, Hernandez was arrested and charged for the murder of Odin Lloyd, a semi-professional player who was dating the sister of Hernandez's fiancée. Hernandez was immediately released by the Patriots following his arrest. He was found guilty of first-degree murder in 2015 and sentenced to life in prison without the possibility of parole at the Souza-Baranowski Correctional Center. While on trial for Lloyd's murder, Hernandez was also indicted for the 2012 double homicide of Daniel de Abreu and Safiro Furtado; he was acquitted in 2017.

Five days after being acquitted of the double homicide, Hernandez was found dead in his cell, which was ruled a suicide. His conviction for Lloyd's murder was initially vacated under the doctrine of abatement ab initio because Hernandez died during its appeal, but was reinstated in 2019 following an appeal from prosecutors and Lloyd's family. Hernandez was posthumously diagnosed with chronic traumatic encephalopathy (CTE), which has led to speculation over how the condition may have affected his behavior.

== Early life ==
=== Family and abuse ===
Aaron Josef Hernandez was born in Bristol, Connecticut, on November 6, 1989, and raised on Greystone Avenue. His parents were Dennis Hernandez, of Puerto Rican descent, and Terri Valentine Hernandez, of Italian descent. As an adult, Hernandez remembered his mother throwing his father out of the house on multiple occasions, but always letting him back in. The couple married in 1986, divorced in 1991, and remarried in 1996. In 1999, they filed for bankruptcy. Hernandez later stated there was constant fighting going on in the home. Both parents would be arrested and involved in crime during their lives.

Hernandez had an older brother, Dennis Jonathan Jr., known as D.J. Their father pushed them to excel, including through sports, but was often abusive towards both the boys and their mother. The beatings Hernandez's father gave him and his brother were sometimes for no reason at all or were alcohol-related, but often came when their father believed they were not trying hard enough in school or athletics. Hernandez and his brother lived in constant fear of their father, but also revered him. Hernandez once came to school with a bruise around his eye, and his coach believed that the injury resulted from his father attacking him. His father once punched Hernandez's youth football coach after a dispute about coaching methods.

Publicly, their father projected an image of someone who had some run-ins with the police but turned his life around to become a good father and citizen. In January 2006, when Hernandez was 16 years old, Dennis died of complications from hernia surgery. According to his mother, Hernandez was heavily affected by his father's death, and he acted out his grief by rebelling against authority figures. Those who knew him said he never got over his father's death.

Hernandez became estranged from his mother, and largely moved in with Tanya Singleton, his older cousin. Following Dennis's death, the family learned that Terri Hernandez and Singleton's husband, Jeff Cummings, had been having an extramarital affair. After the affair became public, Singleton and Cummings divorced, and Cummings moved in with Terri. This "enraged" Hernandez. It was while he was living with Singleton that Hernandez became more involved in criminal activity.

In a jailhouse conversation, Hernandez accused his mother, Terri, of failing to obtain medication for his ADHD, which he said caused him to struggle in school. In another call, he told her, "There's so many things I would love to talk to you [about], so you can know me as a person. But I never could tell you. And you're gonna die without even knowing your son."

According to Hernandez's brother D.J., Hernandez was also sexually molested as a child. A teenage boy in his babysitter's house forced Hernandez to perform oral sex on him beginning when Hernandez was six years old and continuing for several years.

=== High school ===
Hernandez attended Bristol Central High School, where he played for the Bristol Rams football team. He was also an exceptional basketball player and track runner. He started as a wide receiver before becoming a tight end, and also played defensive end. As a senior, he was Connecticut's Gatorade Football Player of the Year after making 67 receptions for 1,807 yards and 24 touchdowns on offense and 72 tackles, twelve sacks, three forced fumbles, two fumble recoveries, and four blocked kicks on defense. He was also a US Army All-American.

The 1,807 receiving yards and 24 touchdowns made by Hernandez were state records. Hernandez's 31 career touchdowns tied the state record. He also set the state record for receiving yards in a single game with 376, the seventh-best in national high school history; he set a national high school record for yards receiving per game with 180.7. Hernandez was considered the top tight-end recruit in 2007 by Scout.com. He was not known for working hard as a child but, by high school, when he was over 6 feet tall, he worked harder than anyone else on the team. During one game in 2006, Hernandez took a blindside hit to the head so hard that he was knocked out cold. An ambulance had to take him off the field.

Hernandez was popular in school. He first began dating his future fiancée, Shayanna Jenkins, during high school. The two had known each other since elementary school. He also smoked a large quantity of marijuana, smoking before school, practices, and games. His social life included "a sizable amount of drinking" in addition to the marijuana.

== College career ==
=== Recruitment ===
At first, Hernandez committed to play at the University of Connecticut with his brother D.J., but later chose to play for the University of Florida under head coach Urban Meyer. Meyer flew to Connecticut and convinced Hernandez's principal to allow him to graduate more than a semester early. This allowed Hernandez to move to Florida, join the team, and learn the playbook shortly after his 17th birthday. The Boston Globe later opined that

There was no way, except physically, he was ready for this. The young man who came to Gainesville wasn't academically prepared or emotionally grounded for college life, according to previously undisclosed college records and recordings of phone calls Hernandez later made from jail. He had graduated high school more than a semester early—not because he was a great student but because he was a great football player. ... The athletic gifts were obvious, but behind them was an angry teenager struggling with an abusive upbringing, a growing dependence on drugs, and questions about his own sexual identity.

Meyer was aided in the recruitment by Steve Addazio, a Connecticut native, and Florida quarterback Tim Tebow. Addazio and Meyer told Hernandez that they believed he had the potential to play in the National Football League (NFL). Hernandez's principal later said that the two were persuasive and heavily pressured Hernandez, but in retrospect that it was a mistake to allow him to graduate early.

Hernandez was not academically prepared for college and had to take remedial courses at Santa Fe Community College. Many of his teammates, particularly those whom Meyer convinced to come to Gainesville early, did likewise.

=== Florida Gators football ===
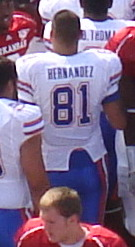
Hernandez with the Florida Gators in 2008

Between practices, games, team meetings, and other events, Hernandez put 40 to 60 hours a week into football, nearly year-round. As a freshman in 2007, Hernandez started three games for the Florida Gators. He finished the season with nine receptions for 151 yards and two touchdowns. Though he excelled his freshman year, he was benched in the season opener of his sophomore year due to a failed drug test. Following that, he started eleven of thirteen games during the 2008 season in place of the injured Cornelius Ingram, and finished the season with 34 receptions for 381 yards and five touchdowns. In the 2009 BCS National Championship Game against the Oklahoma Sooners, Hernandez led the Gators in receiving yards with 57 on five receptions, as the Gators defeated the Sooners 24–14 to win their second BCS championship in three seasons.

As a junior in 2009, and after leading the team in receptions with 68 for 850 yards and five touchdowns, Hernandez won the John Mackey Award as the nation's best tight end. He was also a first-team All-Southeastern Conference selection and was recognized as a first-team All-American by the Associated Press, College Football News, and The Sporting News. During his final game, he threw the ball into the stands to celebrate a touchdown. The excessive display risked a personal foul penalty, but sportswriters saw an athlete with little to lose personally if he chose to go into the NFL instead of returning for another year of collegiate football.

Hernandez later said that he was high on drugs every time he took the field. Meyer had wanted to remove Hernandez from the team for his chronic marijuana use, but relented after an appeal from Tebow. However, after Hernandez's junior year, Meyer told him that he would not be welcome back for a fourth year, and that he would have to try to get picked up by a professional team in the 2010 NFL draft. Hernandez finished his college career with 111 receptions for 1,382 yards and 12 touchdowns.

=== Off the field ===
Hernandez was always trying to be "the life of the party", according to a teammate. His classes his first year included bowling, theater appreciation, wildlife issues, and a course entitled "plants, gardening and you". During his first semester, he largely earned Bs. He made the conference honor roll during his sophomore year, but as a junior got a D in a class on poverty and did not complete his second attempt at an introductory statistics class.

Meyer later said that he found Hernandez to be "a distressed person" when he arrived on campus and tried to steer him in the right direction. Florida coaches aligned Hernandez with Maurkice and Mike Pouncey. He reportedly grew close with the twins after rooming with them and staff considered the Pounceys a positive influence on Hernandez.

== Professional career ==
=== Pre-draft ===
On January 6, 2010, Hernandez announced his decision to forgo his senior year and enter the draft. He attended the NFL Scouting Combine, but was unable to perform any physical drills after tearing a muscle in his back during the offseason. On March 17, 2010, Hernandez participated at Florida's pro day and performed all of the combine drills. His time in the 40-yard dash would have ranked fourth among all tight ends at the NFL Combine. Hernandez also performed 30 repetitions of 225 pounds on the bench press and would have been the top performance of all tight ends, surpassing Dennis Pitta's top performance of 27 repetitions.

NFL analyst Mike Mayock stated that "off the field concerns" and concerns over Hernandez's physical size were causing his draft stock to plummet, but believed that Hernandez would still be drafted in the second round. At the conclusion of the pre-draft process, he was projected to be a second round pick by the majority of NFL draft experts and scouts. He was ranked as the third-best tight end prospect in the draft by Bleacher Report, was ranked the fourth-best by Mayock, and was ranked the fifth-best by DraftScout.com.

Pre-draft measurables
Height	Weight	Arm length	Hand span	40-yard dash	10-yard split	20-yard split	20-yard shuttle	Three-cone drill	Vertical jump	Broad jump	Bench press
6 ft 2 3/8 in (1.89 m)	245 lb (111 kg)	32 1/4 in (0.82 m)	9 3/4 in (0.25 m)	4.64 s	1.65 s	2.71 s	4.18 s	6.83 s	33.0 in (0.84 m)	9 ft 3 in (2.82 m)	30 reps
All values from NFL Combine/Florida's Pro Day

=== Draft and signing ===
The New England Patriots selected Hernandez in the fourth round (113th overall) of the 2010 NFL draft at 20 years old. The previous day, in the second round, the Patriots selected Arizona Wildcats tight end Rob Gronkowski (42nd overall). Hernandez was the sixth tight end drafted in 2010. Despite him being considered a top tight end prospect, multiple teams reportedly chose not to draft him because "he was a problem".

Hernandez's draft stock had plummeted due to multiple off-the-field issues during college, rumors of multiple failed drug tests, and character concerns. Multiple teams elected to remove Hernandez from their draft boards entirely due to character concerns, including the Indianapolis Colts, Cincinnati Bengals, and Miami Dolphins. Hernandez received the lowest possible score in "social maturity" in a pre-draft report. The Patriots signed free agent Alge Crumpler and selected both Hernandez and Gronkowski after they overhauled the tight end position by releasing Benjamin Watson and opting to not re-sign Chris Baker and backup Michael Matthews.

On April 27, 2010, The Boston Globe reported from multiple sources that Hernandez admitted to scouts and team representatives during interviews at the NFL Combine that he had a history of marijuana use and had failed multiple drug tests while in college. Later that day, the Patriots released a statement from Hernandez, who said that he had failed only one drug test while in college and was candid about it to interested teams at the NFL Combine. He wrote a letter to every team, offering to be tested every other week during his rookie season. Patriots owner Robert Kraft later said, after Hernandez's arrest, that the Patriots drafted him after he gained their trust and said they had "absolutely nothing to worry about" in a letter sent to Patriots Director of Player Personnel Nick Caserio before the draft.

On June 8, 2010, the Patriots signed Hernandez to a four-year, $2.37 million contract that included a signing bonus of $200,000. The terms of his contract limited Hernandez's signing bonus to $200,000, which was less than half the signing bonus received by Patriots fourth-round pick (118th overall) Memphis Tigers placekicker Stephen Gostkowski in 2006. The Patriots declined to give Hernandez the expected $500,000 signing bonus as a precautionary measure. To compensate for the smaller signing bonus, he received a contract that included a series of roster and workout bonuses up to an additional $700,000. If Hernandez reached all bonuses and escalators he could receive an annual salary comparable to a third-rounder, but would have to "walk the straight and narrow line to do so".

=== 2010 ===
Throughout training camp, Hernandez competed to be a starting tight end against Crumpler, Gronkowski, and Rob Myers. Hernandez had an impressive preseason alongside Gronkowski. Their preseason performance would ultimately foreshadow their future success as one of the top tight end tandems in league history. Head coach Bill Belichick named Hernandez the third tight end on the Patriots depth chart, behind Crumpler and Gronkowski. Hernandez was used as the receiving tight end option with Crumpler inserted for plays that required blocking. Hernandez started the 2010 season as the youngest player on any active roster in the NFL.

Hernandez made his professional regular season debut and first career start at 20 years old in the Patriots' season opener against the Bengals and recorded one reception for 45 yards during their 38–24 victory. On September 19, 2010, he made six receptions for a total of 101 receiving yards during the Patriots' 28–14 loss at the New York Jets in Week 2. Hernandez became the youngest player since 1960 to have more than 100 receiving yards in a single game. In Week 3, Hernandez led all Patriots receivers with six catches for 65 yards during a 38–30 win against the Buffalo Bills. He also had his first career carry for a three-yard gain against the Bills in Week 3. On November 7, 2010, Hernandez caught five passes for 48 yards and scored the first two touchdowns of his career during a 34–14 loss at the Cleveland Browns in Week 9. He caught his first career touchdown on a two-yard pass by Patriots' quarterback Tom Brady during the second quarter. His second touchdown of the game was scored on a one-yard pass by Brady in the fourth quarter.

On December 19, 2010, Hernandez made four catches for 31 yards and caught two touchdown passes in the Patriots' 31–27 win against the Green Bay Packers in Week 15. His two-touchdown performance earned him the Pepsi NFL Rookie of the Week. Hernandez was inactive for the last two games of the regular season (Weeks 16–17) due to a hip injury. He finished his rookie season in 2010 with 45 receptions for 563 receiving yards and six touchdown receptions over 14 games with seven starts. Hernandez and Gronkowski began having success as Belichick increased the use of two tight end sets to capitalize on their exceptional receiving ability. Together, they combined for 87 receptions for 1,109 receiving yards and 16 receiving touchdowns.

The Patriots finished the 2010 season first in the AFC East with a 14–2 record and earned a first round bye. On January 16, 2011, Hernandez started in his first career playoff game and caught one pass for a four-yard gain as the Patriots lost 28–21 against the New York Jets in the AFC Divisional Round.

=== 2011 ===
On February 21, 2011, it was reported that Hernandez had undergone hip surgery after injuring it in Week 15. He entered training camp slated as a backup tight end and competed to be the secondary tight end against Crumpler and Lee Smith.

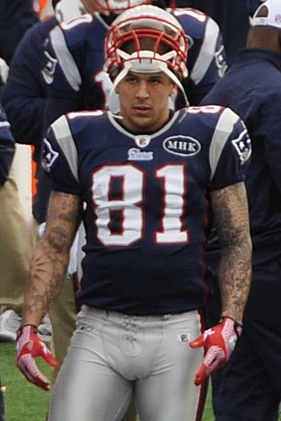
Hernandez in December 2011

During training camp, wide receiver Chad Johnson arrived in a trade from the Bengals. Hernandez immediately let Johnson, who then legally had the last name "Ochocinco" based on his uniform number, have the No. 85, choosing to go back to his college number of No. 81, which was worn in 2010 by wide receiver Randy Moss, but became available after Moss was traded to the Minnesota Vikings in 2010. Johnson and Hernandez both claimed no compensation was arranged and the transaction was a kind gesture between teammates and nothing more. Hernandez's attorney, Jose Baez, claimed Hernandez saw an opportunity after the arrival of Johnson and offered No. 85 to Johnson for $75,000. It was claimed by Baez that Johnson countered with a $50,000 offer that Hernandez accepted. The money was reportedly used to finance a wholesale marijuana purchase by Hernandez for his cousin's husband, T.L. Singleton, who later paid Hernandez back $120,000 for the loan.

Belichick named Hernandez the secondary starting tight end to start the regular season, alongside primary tight end Gronkowski. Belichick continued to increase the use of the Patriots "12 personnel" and began using Hernandez as an H-back lined up in the slot to dictate pass coverages. He started in the Patriots' 2011 season-opener at the Dolphins and caught seven passes for 103-yards and scored on a one-yard touchdown pass by Brady during the third quarter of a 38–24 victory. The following week, Hernandez made seven receptions for 62-yards and a touchdown before exiting in the third quarter of the Patriots' 35–21 win against the San Diego Chargers due to a knee injury. He was diagnosed with a sprained MCL and was inactive for the next two games (Weeks 3–4). On December 19, 2011, Hernandez caught a season-high nine passes for 129 receiving yards and scored one touchdown during a 41–23 victory at the Denver Broncos in Week 15. On December 28, 2011, it was announced he was voted to the 2012 Pro Bowl as an alternate. Hernandez was perceived as a snub for the Pro Bowl by many analysts who argued he was more deserving than San Diego Chargers' tight end Antonio Gates. He finished the season with a career-high 79 receptions for 910 receiving yards and seven touchdown receptions in 14 games and 12 starts. Hernandez ranked 15th among all players in receptions in 2011 and fifth among tight ends. New England Patriots' wide receiver Wes Welker finished first in the league with 122 receptions and Gronkowski finished fifth among all players with 90 total receptions in 2011. Hernandez also finished 31st in the league with 910 receiving yards and tied for 21st with seven touchdown receptions.

According to NBC Sports, Hernandez and Gronkowski were the first pair of tight-ends in NFL history to catch at least five touchdowns each in consecutive seasons for the same team. In 2011, they also set NFL records for yardage, receptions, and touchdowns by tight ends on one team, combining for 169 receptions, 2,237 yards, and 24 touchdowns. The previous records for receptions and yards by multiple tight ends on a single team were set in 1984 by the San Diego Chargers, who used four tight ends to combine for 163 receptions and 1,927 yards; The success of the Hernandez-Gronkowski tandem revolutionized the tight end position. Multiple teams attempted to recreate the success of the Patriots' "12 Personnel" that used two-tight end sets. Hernandez was considered to be the top H-Back in the league in 2011 and the tandem of Hernandez and Gronkowski widely regarded as one of the top offensive tandems in the league. The combination of Hernandez and Gronkowski tied for the most touchdown receptions in 2011 with the Green Bay Packers' wide receiver tandem of Jordy Nelson and Greg Jennings. They also had the most receptions of any offensive tandem in 2011 and finished fourth in receiving yards among all offensive tandems. Hernandez and Gronkowski were by far the top tight end combination in 2011. Their 2,237 receiving yards finished first among all tight end tandems in 2011 with the Carolina Panthers' tight end combination of Jeremy Shockey and Greg Olsen coming in second with 995 combined receiving yards.

The Patriots finished first in the AFC East with a 13–3 record and earned a first round bye. On January 14, 2012, Hernandez made four receptions for 55-yards and one touchdown in the Patriots' 45–10 win against the Broncos in the AFC Divisional Round. Hernandez also had a 42-yard carry against the Broncos on the Patriots' first offensive drive of the game. The following week, the Patriots defeated the Baltimore Ravens 23–20 in the AFC Championship Game. Hernandez caught seven passes for 66 receiving yards during the game. On February 5, 2012, Hernandez started in Super Bowl XLVI and caught eight passes for 67 yards and made a 12-yard touchdown reception as the Patriots lost 21–17 to the New York Giants.

=== 2012 ===
On August 27, 2012, the Patriots signed Hernandez to a five-year, $39.58 million contract extension that included $15.95 million guaranteed and a signing bonus of $12.50 million. The $12.5 million signing bonus was the largest signing bonus ever received by an NFL tight end. His $40 million total was the second-largest contract extension ever given to a tight end, after teammate Gronkowski's $53 million. Hernandez gave $50,000 of that bonus to a charity named for the late wife of the Patriots owner.

Hernandez was sidelined during the Patriots' Week 2 game against the Arizona Cardinals with a high ankle sprain and missed several weeks. On December 10, during the Monday Night Football game against the Houston Texans, Hernandez recorded eight receptions for 58 yards and two touchdowns.

Hernandez's last NFL appearance was the 2012 AFC Championship game on January 20, 2013, against the Baltimore Ravens, where he had nine catches for 83 yards in the 28–13 loss.

=== Relationship with the team ===
Hernandez was not popular with his teammates, and had few friends in the locker room. According to one of his teammates, he seemed to enjoy being an outcast on the team. Brady was overheard after a game telling Tim Tebow, Hernandez's quarterback in college, that he was trying to steer Hernandez in the right direction but called him "a lot to handle". Tebow had previously tried to help Hernandez and enlisted Brady for the same purpose. Hernandez was, however, known as one of the hardest working members of the team.

Other Patriots said that Hernandez was often seeking attention and at times seemed "unhinged". Belichick was running out of patience with Hernandez by June 2013, and intended to notify the front office to have Hernandez released from the team. After his arrest for the murder of Odin Lloyd, Belichick prohibited Hernandez's name from being spoken in the locker room. Gronkowski repeatedly declined to answer any questions about Hernandez in interviews and nearly walked out during a CBS interview in July 2013 until the reporter agreed to change the subject away from his former teammate.

In one of his letters sent from his time in prison, Hernandez disparaged Kraft as "fake-ass non-loyal" but expressed admiration for several of his teammates. He was probably the closest with Brady, he said, and also friendly with Julian Edelman and Deion Branch. He also called Gronkowski "the BEST TE ever to walk on a football field". Hernandez also had close friendships with Brandon Spikes and Fred Taylor, who both expressed their support of Hernandez following his death.

== Career statistics ==
Legend
**Bold**	Career high

=== NFL ===
==== Regular season ====
Year	Team	Games		Receiving					Rushing					Fumbles	
Year	Team	GP	GS	Rec	Yds	Avg	Lng	TD	Att	Yds	Avg	Lng	TD	Fum	Lost
2010	NE	14	7	45	563	**12.5**	**46**	6	3	**47**	**15.7**	18	0	0	0
2011	NE	14	12	**79**	**910**	11.5	**46**	**7**	**5**	45	9.0	**19**	0	**1**	**1**
2012	NE	10	10	51	483	9.5	31	5	1	5	5.0	5	0	0	0
Career		38	29	175	1,956	11.2	46	18	9	97	10.8	19	0	1	1

==== Postseason ====
Year	Team	Games		Receiving					Rushing					Fumbles	
Year	Team	GP	GS	Rec	Yds	Avg	Lng	TD	Att	Yds	Avg	Lng	TD	Fum	Lost
2010	NE	1	1	1	4	4.0	4	0	—	—	—	—	—	0	0
2011	NE	3	2	**19**	**188**	9.9	20	**2**	**8**	**70**	**8.8**	**43**	0	0	0
2012	NE	2	2	15	168	**11.2**	**40**	0	1	6	6.0	6	0	0	0
Career		6	5	35	360	10.3	40	2	9	76	8.4	43	0	0	0

=== College ===
Season	Team	GP	Receiving			
Season	Team	GP	Rec	Yds	Avg	TD
2007	Florida	13	9	151	**16.8**	2
2008	Florida	13	34	381	11.2	**5**
2009	Florida	14	**68**	**850**	12.5	**5**
Career		40	111	1,382	12.5	12

== Legal issues ==
Hernandez had a number of run-ins with the law throughout his life, beginning just a few months after he arrived in Florida as a pre-freshman. By his own admission, Hernandez became jumpy in nightclubs, and had a history of taking offense at minor slights. He also said that he believed people were trying to physically challenge him and were looking to fight him.

Acquaintances described Hernandez as a follower who put himself in jeopardy by hanging out with a dangerous crowd. As a Patriot, Hernandez hired two of his friends from Bristol, both of whom had criminal records, as assistants. One of them, Alexander S. Bradley, was his drug dealer. As Hernandez's assistant, Bradley's other duties included calming Hernandez down during fits of rage and paranoia, and obtaining weapons for him. After his death, his high school teammate Dennis SanSoucie said that being drafted by the Patriots "was the worst thing the NFL could have done" because it put him back into close proximity to the criminal friends he had in Connecticut.

Hernandez had a second apartment that was kept a secret from his fiancée Shayanna Jenkins. It was used to store drugs and weapons. He would often go there to chain smoke marijuana. In 2012, Hernandez told his agent that he got his respect through weapons. Boston Police detectives once questioned Hernandez outside of a local bar, but the circumstances around the interview are unclear.

While in prison, he told a fellow prisoner that he was a member of the Bloods.

=== 2007 Gainesville bar fight ===
On April 28, 2007, according to a police report in Gainesville, Florida, a 17-year-old Hernandez consumed two alcoholic drinks in a restaurant with Tim Tebow, refused to pay the bill, and was escorted out by a restaurant employee. As the manager walked away, Hernandez "sucker punched" him on the side of the head, rupturing his eardrum.

The police responded at 1:17 a.m. Hernandez called Coach Urban Meyer, and Meyer called Huntley Johnson, the team's unofficial defense lawyer. The victim later told police that he had been contacted by lawyers and the team and that a settlement was being worked out, something the team denied. The police department recommended charging Hernandez with felony battery, but the incident was settled out of court with a deferred prosecution agreement.

=== 2007 Gainesville double shooting ===
On September 30, 2007, someone approached a car containing Randall Carson, Justin Glass, and Corey Smith on foot and fired five shots while they were waiting at a Gainesville traffic light after having left a nightclub. Smith was shot in the back of the head, and Glass was shot in the arm. Both men survived. Carson, a back-seat passenger, was unharmed, and told police that the shooter was a "Hawaiian" or "Hispanic" male with a large build weighing about 230 lb (100 kg) and having many tattoos. He picked a photo of Hernandez out of a police lineup.

The police told Meyer's personal assistant that they wanted to see Hernandez and two teammates immediately. Detectives "kept pushing coaches" to bring the players to the station, but they did not arrive for four hours. In the interim, the players spoke with Johnson, the attorney who often represented players. The other players cooperated with police, but Hernandez invoked his right to counsel and refused to talk to police. When police walked into the room to speak to Hernandez, the last of the players to be interviewed, they found him with his head down on the table and sleeping, a posture they said was unusual for someone in the middle of a shooting investigation.

No charges were filed at the time but, due to his 2013 arrest and subsequent conviction for the murder of Odin Lloyd, Massachusetts authorities contacted police in Florida to try to determine whether Hernandez was suspected to have a role in the 2007 shooting. Detective Tom Mullins, who was assigned to reinvestigate the shooting, concluded that Hernandez was not the triggerman. Although Carson initially identified Hernandez as such, other witnesses that night described the shooter as looking like a black male, possibly with cornrows. When Mullins re-interviewed Carson, Carson rescinded his statement of the shooter matching Hernandez and said he never saw Hernandez at the scene, but assumed he was the shooter because "they had words earlier at the club".

=== 2011 Plainville fight ===
At 3:45 a.m. on April 30, 2011, police responded to a fight in front of Hernandez's rented townhouse in Plainville, Massachusetts. A high school friend had been pulled over earlier in the evening after driving Hernandez home from a Boston bar. The driver was weaving in and out of lanes and traveling at 120 miles per hour in a work zone and on a highway with a speed limit of 55 miles per hour. The Massachusetts State Trooper who pulled the car over did not arrest the driver because he recognized Hernandez in the passenger seat. The Plainville police also recognized Hernandez, and told the two to go indoors.

=== 2012 Boston double homicide ===
Hernandez was investigated in connection with a double homicide that took place on July 16, 2012, near the Cure Lounge in Boston's South End. Daniel Jorge Correia de Abreu, 29, and Safiro Teixeira Furtado, 28, both immigrants from Cape Verde and living in Dorchester, were killed by gunshots fired into their vehicle. Witnesses testified that Hernandez's silver SUV pulled up next to the victims and someone from his car yelled racial epithets towards the victims. Someone from the car then fired five shots, killing the two men. Police immediately identified Hernandez, who was then playing for the Patriots, in the club's security camera footage, but thought it was a coincidence that Hernandez happened to be at the club that evening.

On May 15, 2014, Hernandez was indicted on murder charges for the killings of de Abreu and Furtado, with additional charges of armed assault and attempted murder associated with shots fired at the surviving occupants in the vehicle. The trial began March 1, 2017. The prosecution case was strongly based on testimony by Bradley, a known drug dealer who had been feuding with Hernandez since Hernandez allegedly shot him in the face and left him to die. Hernandez and Bradley each claimed that the other person pulled the trigger.

Jose Baez, Hernandez's attorney, argued that the proposed motive was implausible, and Hernandez was a suspect of convenience too close to two unsolved murders. Bradley alleged that Hernandez was infuriated after the victims spilled a drink on him at a nightclub several hours before the shooting and killed them in retaliation. Security camera footage confirmed that Hernandez was in the club for less than ten minutes. Around that time, he calmly posed for a photo with a fan, and left by himself – contradicting Bradley's testimony that he departed with Hernandez. Furthermore, Baez characterized the police investigation as extraordinarily sloppy (e.g., the victims' bodies were kept in their bullet-riddled vehicle as it was towed away from the shooting scene, a major protocol violation) with no physical evidence tying Hernandez to the murders.

According to The Boston Globe, there was "powerful evidence that [Hernandez] was at the scene and played a role in their deaths". On April 14, 2017, Hernandez was acquitted of the murders and most of the other charges and found guilty of illegal possession of a handgun.

=== 2013 traffic stop ===
In January 2013, Hernandez and Bradley partied at Cure again. At 2:20 a.m., Bradley was pulled over on the Southeast Expressway after his vehicle was seen speeding at 105 miles per hour. According to the State Police he was "wobbly drunk". Hernandez tried to get his friend out of trouble by saying, "Trooper, I am Aaron Hernandez. It's okay." Bradley was arrested for drunk driving.

=== 2013 Miami shooting of Alexander Bradley ===
In February 2013, Hernandez, Bradley, and several others visited a Florida strip club where they had a $10,000 bill. Hernandez began to worry about two men sitting across from them, thinking they were plainclothes Boston police officers. Bradley later recalled telling Hernandez that they were probably tracking the pair as part of their investigation into the double murder outside the Cure.

Hernandez and Bradley had a troubled relationship at this point. Bradley claimed that on February 13, 2013, during the same trip, he woke up in a car with Hernandez pointing a gun at his face. The next morning, police found Bradley lying in a parking lot and bleeding from a bullet hole between his eyes. Bradley survived, but lost his right eye. He did not cooperate with police, and sought revenge.

The pair would trade more than 500 text messages in the next three months, which included death threats and attempts at extortion. Bradley told Hernandez that he had "semiautomatic weapons, bulletproof vests, and a crew that ran six deep". Hernandez's agent tried, unsuccessfully, to settle the matter quietly. Bradley demanded $5 million to keep his silence, and Hernandez countered with $1.5 million. Bradley then asked for $2.5 million. Hernandez did not respond, and went to see his lawyer.

On June 13, 2013, Bradley filed a civil lawsuit for damages against Hernandez in a Florida federal court. He withdrew the suit four days later, giving the two a chance to work out a settlement without the media knowing about it. On September 3, 2013, Hernandez's lawyers filed a postponement request in federal court until his murder charges were resolved. In February 2016, Hernandez reached a settlement with Bradley over the lawsuit. The terms of the settlement were not disclosed.

On May 11, 2015, Hernandez was indicted for witness intimidation in relation to the Bradley shooting, since Bradley was reportedly a witness to the 2012 Boston double homicide. The intimidation charge for Hernandez carried a maximum penalty of ten years in prison. This charge was included in Hernandez's trial for the double homicide, which began on March 1, 2017. During the trial, it was revealed Bradley texted his lawyer about the shooting in a deleted text message, which read: "Now u sure once I withdraw this lawsuit I wont be held on perjury after I tell the truth about me not recalling anything about who shot me." According to Hernandez, the shooting of Bradley was the result of a drug deal gone wrong. "Aaron was telling us that there was a drug deal that was going on and it went bad and [Alexander Bradley] he was pissed at Aaron for vouching for these guys," his attorney Jose Baez said in an interview.

Hernandez was later acquitted of the charge of witness intimidation by a jury on April 14, 2017. They found Hernandez guilty on one count of illegal possession of firearms and acquitted him of all other charges in the murders of de Abreu and Furtado.

=== 2013 California incidents ===
Hernandez traveled to California with Jenkins and their young daughter in 2013 to have shoulder surgery. While there, Jenkins called the police twice in less than a week, claiming that Hernandez was drunk and violent. In the first incident, Hernandez put his hand through a window. Hernandez's brother and friends later said that there were drugs and guns in the rented apartment, but police determined that Jenkins and the child were not in danger and never searched the premises. D.J. Hernandez found his brother alone on the roof of the building one night, looking defeated and rubbing the barrel of a gun against his face.

== Murder of Odin Lloyd ==
On June 18, 2013, police searched Hernandez's home in connection with an investigation into the shooting death of a friend, Odin Lloyd, whose body was found, with multiple gunshot wounds to the back and chest, in an industrial park about a mile from Hernandez's house.

The following day, Hernandez assured Patriots head coach Bill Belichick and owner Robert Kraft that he had nothing to do with the shooting. After this, Hernandez was "barred" from Gillette Stadium lest it become "the site of a media stakeout". The team also decided, a week before his eventual arrest, to sever all ties with Hernandez if he was arrested on any charge related to the case.

On June 26, 2013, Hernandez was charged with first-degree murder, in addition to five gun-related charges. The Patriots released Hernandez from the team about ninety minutes later, before being officially informed of the charges against him. Two other men were also arrested in connection with Lloyd's death.

On August 22, 2013, Hernandez was indicted by a grand jury for the murder of Lloyd; he pled not guilty on September 6, 2013. On April 15, 2015, he was found guilty of murder in the first degree, a charge that in Massachusetts automatically carried a sentence of life imprisonment without any possibility of parole; he also was found guilty of five firearm charges. A motive for the murder was never definitively established. Police investigated the possibility that Lloyd may have learned of Hernandez's bisexuality and that Hernandez was worried that Lloyd might out him to others.

=== Release from team and aftermath ===
Hernandez's arrest and subsequent termination by the Patriots resulted in financial and other consequences. He automatically forfeited his 2015–2018 salaries, totaling $19.3 million, which were not guaranteed. The Patriots voided all remaining guarantees, including his 2013 and 2014 salaries, on the terms that those guarantees were for skill, injury, or salary cap room, and did not include being cut for "conduct detrimental to the best interests of professional football". The team planned to withhold $3.25 million of Hernandez's 2012 signing bonus that was due to be paid in 2014, and to recoup the signing bonus already paid. The NFL salary cap allows teams to pro-rate signing bonuses over the life of a contract or a five-year period, whichever is shorter. By releasing Hernandez, the Patriots accelerated all of Hernandez's remaining guaranteed money into the 2013 and 2014 salary caps: the team took a $2.55 million hit in 2013, and another $7.5 million in 2014.

Since Hernandez had not completed his fourth season in the league, the Patriots were required to place him on waivers after releasing him and he went unclaimed. After Hernandez cleared waivers on June 28, NFL commissioner Roger Goodell announced that, while charges against Hernandez were pending, the NFL would not approve any contract signed by Hernandez until Goodell held a hearing to determine whether or not Hernandez should face suspension or other action under the league's Personal Conduct Policy. In prison phone calls, Hernandez expressed distress at his treatment by Belichick and the Patriots.

Within hours of Hernandez's arrest, employees at the team's official pro shop at Patriot Place were instructed to remove all his memorabilia and merchandise, and to remove these items from its website as well. The Patriots ProShop exchanged about 2,500 previously sold Hernandez jerseys for other jerseys, destroying and recycling the Hernandez jerseys for a loss of approximately $250,000.

CytoSport and Puma terminated their endorsement deals with Hernandez. EA Sports announced that Hernandez's likeness would be removed from its NCAA Football 14 and Madden NFL 25 video games. After visitor complaints, a prize-winning photograph of Hernandez from his rookie season, depicting him high-stepping into the end zone in front of Green Bay Packers cornerback Sam Shields, was removed from the Pro Football Hall of Fame. Panini America, a sports memorabilia and trading-card company, removed stickers of Hernandez from approximately 500,000 sticker books that had not yet been sent to collectors. The company replaced the stickers, as well as trading cards, with cards depicting Tim Tebow.

The University of Florida removed Hernandez's name and likeness from various locations at its football facilities, including a stone that had his name and "All American" inscribed upon it. Bristol Central High School also removed all his awards and gave them to his family. Pop Warner removed his name from a list of award recipients.

Hernandez gave power of attorney to his agent, and instructed him to provide his fiancée with $3,000 a month and to help her find more affordable housing. He also set aside $500,000 for his fiancée and their daughter, and $120,000 for a close friend. After his arrest, his vacant house fell into "extreme disrepair", including suffering burst pipes and mold.

=== Appeal and conviction ===
After Hernandez's death, on April 25, 2017, his lawyers filed a motion at Massachusetts Superior Court in Fall River to vacate his murder conviction. The request was granted May 9, 2017; therefore Hernandez legally died an innocent man, due to the legal principle of abatement ab initio. Under Massachusetts law, this principle asserts that when a criminal defendant dies but has not exhausted all legal appeals, the case reverts to its status "at the beginning"—the conviction is vacated and the defendant is rendered "innocent". At the time of his death, Hernandez was in the process of filing an appeal for his 2015 conviction in the murder of Odin Lloyd.

As of May 9, 2017, the date of the judge's ruling to vacate, the Bristol County district attorneys stated they planned to appeal the ruling, to the Massachusetts Supreme Court if necessary. The Lloyd family was disappointed with the ruling; however, their attorney did not believe it would affect the wrongful death civil suit which the family had filed.

The appeal was heard by the Massachusetts Supreme Judicial Court in November 2018, a year after Hernandez's death, by six justices. The attorney representing the Lloyd family, Thomas M. Quinn, III, argued that Hernandez was rightfully convicted of Lloyd's murder and that the conviction was unfairly cancelled. Quinn also argued that Hernandez killed himself knowing of the technicality that would get his conviction undone, and that, "He should not be able to accomplish in death, what he never would have been able to do in life."

On March 13, 2019, the Supreme Judicial Court reinstated Hernandez's conviction, and stated that the trial record would note that his conviction was "neither affirmed nor reversed"; the appeal was rendered moot because Hernandez died while the case was on appeal. The Court, in their ruling, also officially ended the practice of abatement ab initio, ruling that it was outdated, never made sense, and that it was "no longer consonant with the circumstances of contemporary life, if, in fact, it ever was". After the ruling, Hernandez' estate vowed to appeal the ruling further.

== Prison ==
The Boston Globe described Hernandez as being "strangely content" while in jail, an attitude that confounded his fiancée Shayanna Jenkins. He told his mother that, "I've been the most relaxed and less stressed in jail than I have out of jail." He was punished on multiple occasions for breaking prison rules, including screaming and banging on his cell door. Over the course of his four years behind bars, he increasingly turned to the Bible and became more religious.

The Globe said that prison officials "seemed to turn a blind eye to Hernandez's drug use [and] neglected to safeguard their famous inmate". A fellow inmate reports multiple instances of Hernandez needing medical attention after smoking too much of the synthetic cannabinoid K2, which was rife at the prison at the time.

Hernandez could speak to Jenkins on the phone, and often did twice a day. She was facing perjury charges related to his arrest. He saw their daughter when Jenkins's mother brought her to visit. While in prison, he reconciled with his mother, from whom he had been estranged for many years.

While being held at the Bristol County Jail, Hernandez was kept in a segregated unit, an "especially grim section" that normally housed the mentally ill and violent. He asked to move out of segregation, but Sheriff Thomas M. Hodgson would not allow it. Hernandez believed that Hodgson exploited his incarceration for publicity.

After his conviction for the murder of Lloyd, Hernandez was transferred to cell 57 of the G-2 block at Souza-Baranowski Correctional Center, a maximum security prison where inmates typically spend twenty hours a day in their cells. In the two years he spent in the prison, Hernandez was disciplined dozens of times. His lawyer claimed that he was taunted relentlessly by guards. According to Keiko Thomas, who was serving 17–19 years with Hernandez on a manslaughter charge, he "was seen as a fraud by many and a god by some". While in prison, Hernandez continued to work out and anticipated returning to the NFL.

When his acquittal on the charges of murdering de Abreu and Furtado was read on the news, the inmates gathered around the television in the prison cheered. They kicked their cell doors and cheered when Hernandez returned to the prison that night. In the five days between his acquittal and his death, Hernandez gave his food and books, and even a television, to his fellow prisoners and gave no indication that he intended to take his own life. Gifts such as these were rare in prison, but not unusual for Hernandez, according to a fellow inmate.

Two days before his death, reporter Michele McPhee appeared on the Kirk and Callahan sports radio show, during which she and the two hosts used innuendo to imply that Hernandez was gay. It has been suggested that this speculative outing may have played a role in Hernandez's suicide.

== Death ==
On April 19, 2017, at 3:05 am EDT, five days after Hernandez was acquitted of the 2012 Boston double homicide of Daniel de Abreu and Safiro Furtado, correction officers found Hernandez hanging with bed sheets from the window in his cell at the Souza-Baranowski Correctional Center in Lancaster, Massachusetts. He was transported to UMass Memorial Hospital-Leominster where he was pronounced dead at 4:07 am. He had been smoking K2, a drug associated with psychosis, within thirty hours of his death. A fellow inmate told investigators that he had spent much of the previous two days smoking the synthetic cannabinoid.

State Department of Correction spokesman Christopher Fallon first said that no suicide note was found in the initial search of the two-person cell, which Hernandez occupied alone. On April 20, 2017, investigators reported that three handwritten notes were next to a Bible opened to John 3:16 and that "John 3:16" was written on his forehead in red ink.

Shampoo was found covering the floor, cardboard was wedged under the cell door to make it difficult for someone to enter, and there were drawings in blood (Note: The blood came from a cut on his right middle finger.) on the walls showing an unfinished pyramid and the all-seeing eye of God, with the word "Illuminati" written in capital letters underneath. The drawings were references to the Five-Percent Nation, a Black supremacist movement. Hernandez learned about the Nation of Gods and Earths, a movement influenced by Islam, through hip-hop culture while in prison. He also expressed an interest in Christianity, telling fellow prisoners that "we all have Jesus Christ inside of us".

Jose Baez, Hernandez's attorney, reprinted the contents of the notes in his 2018 book Unnecessary Roughness. One short letter was addressed to Baez, thanking him for securing the acquittal in the double homicide and anticipating an appeal in the Odin Lloyd case. In addition, he asked Baez to pass along thanks to specific musicians whose songs Hernandez found inspiring. The other two notes were addressed to Hernandez's fiancée and daughter. He told Jenkins "You're rich," which prosecutors in the Lloyd case believed was a reference to abatement ab initio, the legal doctrine that vacates convictions if a defendant dies before his appeals are exhausted.

In contrast to the straightforward letter to Baez, the lawyer described the other notes as written in a disjointed and markedly "ominous" tone. The letter to his daughter was described by The Boston Globe as "strange, rambling, mystical, and tender". In these notes, Hernandez described entering a "timeless realm" and announced he would see his family in heaven.

Prison officials had not observed any signs that Hernandez was at risk for suicide, so he had not been put on around-the-clock watch. Upon completion of the autopsy by the medical examiner, the death was officially ruled a suicide by hanging. At the request of his family, Hernandez's brain was released to Boston University to be studied for signs of chronic traumatic encephalopathy (CTE), a progressive degenerative disease found in people who have had a severe blow or repeated blows to the head, including football players. Baez quickly disputed any claim of suicide and stated that he would initiate his own investigation of the death. In 2018, Baez wrote that he was initially suspicious of the suicide finding, given Hernandez's optimistic demeanor after the acquittal in the double homicide, but later came to believe Hernandez had taken his own life, with CTE being a major contributing factor. After his brain was removed, Hernandez's body was cremated and the ashes were given to his family. A private funeral service was held for Hernandez in his hometown of Bristol, Connecticut, following his death and was attended by his family, friends and former teammates including Maurkice Pouncey, Mike Pouncey, and Brandon Spikes, and his attorneys.

The New England Patriots declined to issue a statement on Hernandez's death. Sports analyst Stephen A. Smith said he had no sympathy for Hernandez after his suicide and instead offered sympathies to the families affected by Hernandez's criminal actions, including Hernandez's own family and Odin Lloyd's family. Odin Lloyd's sister Olivia Thibou told Bleacher Report of her reaction to Hernandez's suicide, "I just started crying. I'm just ... confused. It doesn't make sense. The timing doesn't make any sense." Thibou said her sister Shaquilla visited their brother's grave after the suicide news broke. Then Shaquilla posted on Facebook: "Not every death deserves an RIP...." Ernesto Abreu, father of Daniel de Abreu, told The Boston Globe, "I'm not happy about his death. It's actually a shame. Any loss of life is a shame. I believe in leaving things in God's hands." Salvatore Furtado, father of Safiro Furtado, similarly told The Boston Globe, "Only God has the right to take somebody's life. It's very painful to me when somebody takes their own life."

Maurkice Pouncey and Mike Pouncey, friends and teammates of Hernandez from the Florida Gators, posted tributes to Hernandez on Instagram following his death. Snoop Dogg posted that he was saddened by Hernandez's death on his social media accounts. Jesse Jackson tweeted "Pray for the soul and family of Aaron Hernandez" after it was announced Hernandez committed suicide. Xavier Nixon, Hernandez's teammate from the Florida Gators, tweeted, "I don't care what anyone says. That was the homie. And no one deserves to go out like that." Deonte Thompson, Hernandez's teammate from the Florida Gators, said in a brief phone interview, "I never thought he'd do that to himself. It's all new to me." Thompson called Hernandez "my guy" while testifying at his double murder trial a month before his suicide.

Former professional football player and sports analyst Shannon Sharpe reflected on Hernandez's downfall, "Once you reach a certain level, once you reach a professional athlete status, a lot of guys leave that life behind; Aaron Hernandez could not. He could not. He was not a studio gangster. He was a for-real gang member, and that was a part of him. That was equally as important to him as playing in the National Football League for the New England Patriots." Donté Stallworth, Hernandez's teammate from the New England Patriots, quoted a photo of Hernandez's fiancée Shayanna Jenkins and their daughter Avielle sitting in the courtroom during his double murder trial a few days before his suicide and tweeted, "While many are ecstatic about Aaron taking his life, let's not forget about this sweet little 4 year old baby who has to grow up with this." Urban Meyer, former head coach of the Florida Gators, later said of Hernandez's suicide in an interview with 48 Hours, "I was crushed. I was devastated. I couldn't imagine the kid that I knew doin' this."

Hernandez was featured in an "In Memoriam" video that paid tribute to NFL players who died in the last year at the U.S. Bank Stadium ahead of Super Bowl LII, surprising reporters in the audience.

== Personal life ==
=== Relationships ===
In 2007, Hernandez began dating Shayanna Jenkins, a girl he had known since elementary school. Their daughter Avielle was born in 2012, the same month that the couple became engaged, also the month that Hernandez purchased a $1.3 million, 8,130-square-foot (755 m^{2}), four-story home with an in-ground pool in North Attleborough, Massachusetts, where the family lived together. Jenkins moved in with Hernandez in 2011, during his second season with the Patriots.

After she discovered him cheating on her, Jenkins moved out but returned in the summer of 2012. During Hernandez's trial for the murder of Odin Lloyd, it was claimed that Hernandez had flirted with and kissed the nanny who took care of his daughter. Jenkins testified in court that she wanted to make their relationship work, and that it required her to compromise on some of his behavior. She told police that she cooked and cleaned and she knew her role. Hernandez and Jenkins never married.

=== Sexuality ===
Following Hernandez's death, a high school teammate, Dennis SanSoucie, described a secret homosexual relationship between the two between the 7th and 11th grades. The teammate stated that Hernandez had many sexual partners, male and female, during this time. Hernandez's brother D.J., mother Terri, and attorney George Leontire report that Hernandez came out as gay to his mother and ex-girlfriend while in prison. Leontire, who is also gay, said his client "clearly was gay" and described the "immense pain that it caused him" and the self-hatred that came from growing up in a culture that was anti-gay. According to Leontire, Hernandez believed that the sexual abuse he experienced as a boy caused him to become gay. SanSoucie stated that Hernandez was terrified that his father would find out about his sexuality. SanSoucie however stated he believes Hernandez was not ashamed of who he was and that he was proud of his sexuality. "Being bisexual has no difference in being an athlete or just being yourself. ... It was just, he couldn't say anything at the time. There was no one in the NFL that ever broke this news," SanSoucie said in an interview.

After listening to nearly 300 recorded phone calls, The Boston Globe reported that Hernandez was "prone to going on homophobic rants." He admitted to a woman that he called frequently from prison that he was attracted to men and said it made him "angry all the time". Patriots receiver Brandon Lloyd said that he had been warned by teammate Wes Welker that Hernandez would expose his genitalia and talk about gay sex. "Everything about Aaron was a struggle," a former teammate from the University of Florida told People. "He had these really angry outbursts a lot, over insignificant things. And when he started, he couldn't stop." The teammate also stated, "He wanted to be the big man on campus who was having sex with a lot of women, but then he'd find guys on the down low. The girls were public, the guys were not. It wasn't his only struggle, but it was a struggle for a guy like Aaron."

Prosecutors intended to raise the issue of his sexuality during the 2012 double homicide trial, a prospect that frightened Hernandez. He wished to keep his sexuality a secret. After his death, his fiancée Shayanna Jenkins said of his sexuality, "Aaron was very much a man to me. I saw no indication he was gay or homosexual. I wish I had known how he felt, just so we could have talked about it. I wouldn't have disowned him. I would have been supportive. I can't fault him if he was feeling that way. When you love someone so much you just want to be there to support them. The fact that he felt he couldn't come out to me or he couldn't tell me these things hurts, because we had that bond. I've accepted that he may have been the way he was said to be, or that it may not be true. Regardless, I won't know."

=== Paranoia ===
D.J. described Hernandez as growing increasingly paranoid as an adult, believing that the Federal Bureau of Investigation and others were out to get him. D.J. said that Hernandez slept with a large knife by his bed and collected a large number of weapons for his protection. After the 2013 shooting of Alexander Bradley, Hernandez hired a friend from Bristol to serve as his bodyguard 24 hours a day. He also installed a sophisticated surveillance system in his home. Shortly thereafter, Hernandez approached coach Bill Belichick "in a state of deepening paranoia", saying he feared for his family's safety. Hernandez's agent testified that Hernandez requested the meeting because he was in fear for his life. Hernandez requested a trade to a team on the other side of the country, but the request was denied.

In April 2013, Hernandez purchased a used car with two handguns and two rifles inside. He also purchased a Chevrolet Suburban that had been outfitted as an armored car. He had secret compartments installed in vehicles to store firearms. When being driven, he refused to travel in cars without tinted windows for fear that one of his enemies might see him. Teammates said that Hernandez was prone to wild mood swings and became more agitated as time went on. He was said to go from being hyper-masculine to talking about cuddling with his mother. As a Patriot, he smoked large quantities of marijuana and used other drugs, including cocaine.

=== Brain damage ===
After his death, researchers at Boston University studied Hernandez's brain and diagnosed him with chronic traumatic encephalopathy (CTE), stage 3 of 4, and described Hernandez's brain as a classic case of the pathology. CTE is caused by repeated head trauma. Hernandez had two confirmed concussions since he began playing football at eight years old, but the Boston Globe believed "he undoubtedly took other punishing hits to the head that were never recorded". CTE is associated with cumulative injuries. In a phone conversation recorded in prison, Hernandez said "I'm like a grandpa. All my bones are so sore."

The researchers suggested that the CTE, which results in poor judgment, lack of impulse control, or aggression, anger, paranoia, emotional volatility, and rage behaviors, may have explained some of Hernandez's criminal acts and other behavior. Sam Gandy of Mount Sinai Hospital in New York said, "It's impossible for me to look at the severity of CTE and Mr. Hernandez's brain and not think that that had a profound effect on his behavior." Hernandez experienced migraines in prison, and had trouble with memory. Jose Baez wrote that he saw symptoms consistent with CTE from his earliest meetings with Hernandez: Hernandez sometimes showed keen insight and observational skills, while other times he had gaps in memory that were highly unusual for a young person.

After release of the Boston University statement, Hernandez's fiancée and daughter sued the Patriots and the NFL for causing Hernandez's death and depriving his daughter of her father's companionship, arguing that Hernandez's NFL career had caused what researchers described as "the most severe case of [CTE] medically seen" in a person at his age. The suit was dismissed in February 2019 because the deadline to opt out of a class action suit against the league had been missed. Hernandez was one of at least 345 NFL players to be diagnosed after death with CTE.

== In other media ==
Hernandez's arrest, conviction, and death attracted a great deal of media attention, especially because of increasing concerns about CTE in athletes. His life was the focus of a 2018 Boston Globe Spotlight Team investigation and a podcast called "Gladiator: Aaron Hernandez & Football, Inc."

A Netflix documentary entitled Killer Inside: The Mind of Aaron Hernandez was released on January 15, 2020.

The FX series American Sports Story is centered on Hernandez's rise in the NFL before his downfall, with Josh Andrés Rivera playing Hernandez.

Hernandez, his crimes, conviction, and suicide were referenced during the Netflix special The Roast of Tom Brady (2024).

== See also ==
- 27 Club – Notional club occupied by those who died at age 27
- 2009 All-America college football team
- Crime in Massachusetts
- New England Patriots all-time roster
- List of NFL players with chronic traumatic encephalopathy
