= Abatement ab initio =

Legal doctrine re death of defendant

Abatement ab initio (Latin for "from the beginning") is a common law legal doctrine that states that the death of a defendant who is appealing a criminal conviction extinguishes all criminal proceedings initiated against that defendant from indictment through conviction. Abatement ab initio was the subject of two United States Supreme Court decisions, Durham v. United States (1971) and Dove v. United States (1976). The former extended the doctrine to cases where certiorari was pending and not yet granted, and the latter excluded discretionary appeals.

== Cases ==
Abatement ab initio was used in federal court to overturn the conviction of Enron CEO Kenneth Lay. In the state of Massachusetts, it was used to overturn the convictions of John Salvi and Aaron Hernandez, both convicted of murder. In the latter case, however, the state appealed the decision; in March 2019 the Massachusetts Supreme Judicial Court reinstated Hernandez's conviction and ended the use of the doctrine in Massachusetts. The ruling held that the defendant's death rendered the appeal moot; it also held that trial records should indicate that such convictions were "neither affirmed nor reversed".

== Retroactive effect ==
In instances where the doctrine is applied, a legal issue emerges concerning previous rulings or actions made. An example is the case of Aaron Hernandez's conviction for Odin Lloyd's murder. Due to the principle of abatement ab initio, his conviction was initially rendered void before the Massachusetts Supreme Court ruled to abolish abatement ab initio (see above). It was thus argued that, since he was cleared of every murder he was accused of, Hernandez's family was entitled to the money that the New England Patriots refused to pay after it voided his contract on account of Lloyd's murder. In 2016, when the court posthumously cleared Kenneth Lay's Enron-related fraud convictions, the compensation for defrauded victims was also lost. A ruling involving asset forfeiture law in the United States held that if an offender satisfied a forfeiture judgment, the government is never required by the principle to return fines that were already paid.

== See also ==
- Ab initio
