= 1906 Massachusetts gubernatorial election =

- November 6, 1906
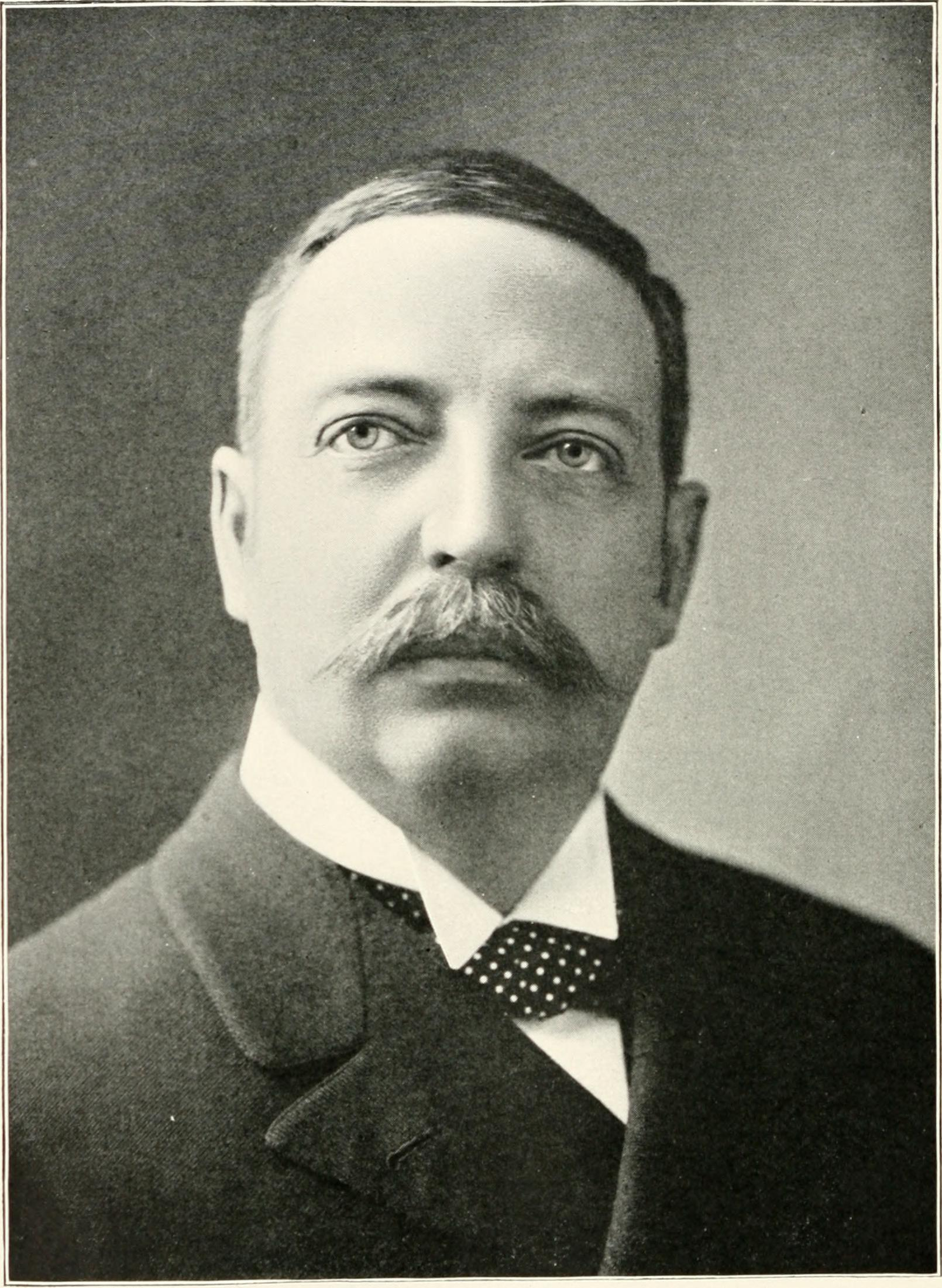

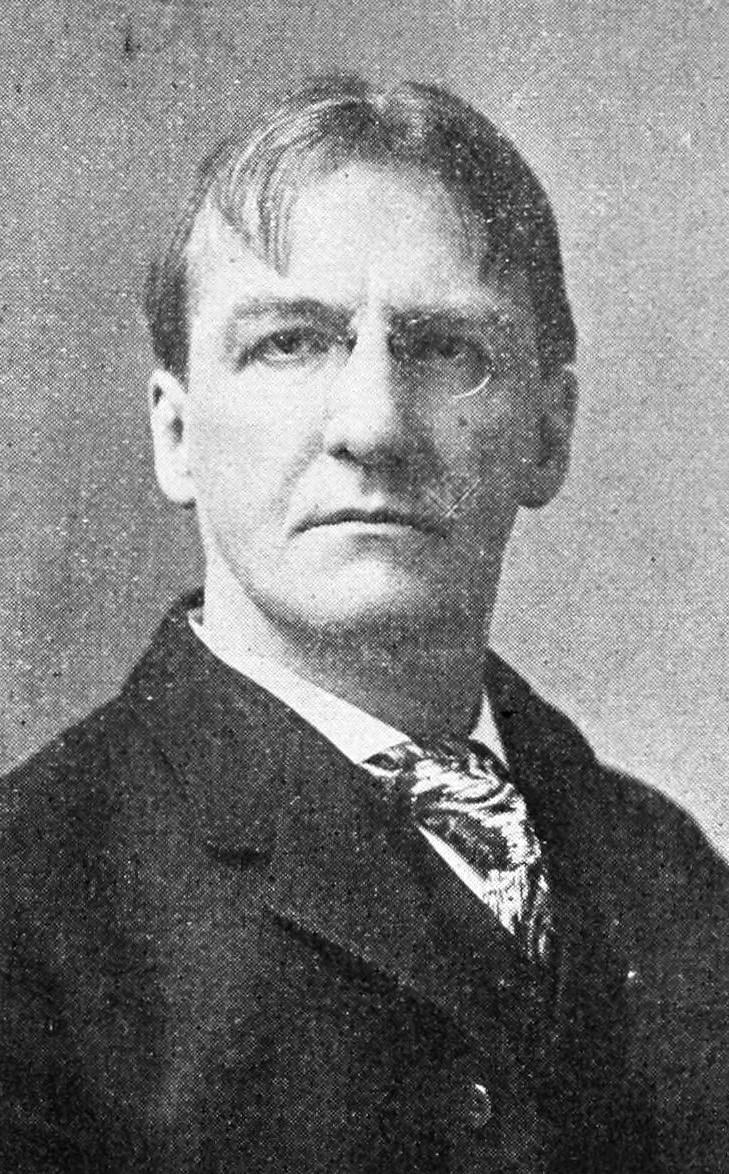
Nominee	Curtis Guild Jr.	John B. Moran
Party	Republican	Democratic
Alliance		Independence; Prohibition
Popular vote	222,528	192,295
Percentage	51.96%	44.90%
- Guild: 40-50% 50–60% 60–70% 70–80% 80–90% >90% Moran: 40-50% 50–60% 60–70%
Governor before election
Curtis Guild Jr.
Republican
Elected Governor
Curtis Guild Jr.
Republican

The 1906 Massachusetts gubernatorial election was held on November 6, 1906. Incumbent Republican Governor Curtis Guild Jr. was re-elected for a second one-year term, defeating Suffolk District Attorney John B. Moran.

== Party nominations ==
John B. Moran won the Prohibition Party and Independence League nominations by acclamation. Incumbent Governor Curtis Guild Jr. won the Republican nomination without opposition.

== General election ==
=== Candidates ===
- Gamaliel Bradford VI, biographer and author (State Government Reform)
- James F. Carey, former state representative from Haverhill (Socialist)
- William H. Carroll (Socialist Labor)
- Curtis Guild Jr., incumbent governor since January 1906 (Republican)
- John B. Moran, Suffolk County district attorney (Democratic, Independent, Independence, and Prohibition)

=== Results ===
1906 Massachusetts gubernatorial election
Party	Candidate	Votes	%	±%
Republican	Curtis Guild Jr. (incumbent)	222,528	51.96%	▲1.50
Democratic	John B. Moran	115,764	27.03%	▼17.67
Independence	John B. Moran	35,855	8.37%	N/A
Prohibition	John B. Moran	25,636	5.99%	▲5.15
Independent	John B. Moran	15,040	3.51%	N/A
Total	John B. Moran	192,295	44.90%	N/A
Socialist	James F. Carey	7,938	1.85%	▼1.44
State Gov. Reform	Gamaliel Bradford	3,312	0.77%	N/A
Socialist Labor	William H. Carroll	2,182	0.51%	▼0.20
Write-in	All others	23	0.01%	▲0.01
Total votes		428,278	100.00%	

== See also ==
- 1906 Massachusetts legislature
