= George Sanger =

George Sanger may refer to:

- Lord George Sanger (1825–1911), English circus proprietor
- George P. Sanger (1831–1894), American lawyer, editor, judge, and businessman
- George Sanger (musician) (born 1957), American video game composer

== See also ==
- George Sangster (disambiguation)
