= John B. Moran =

American politician (1859–1909)

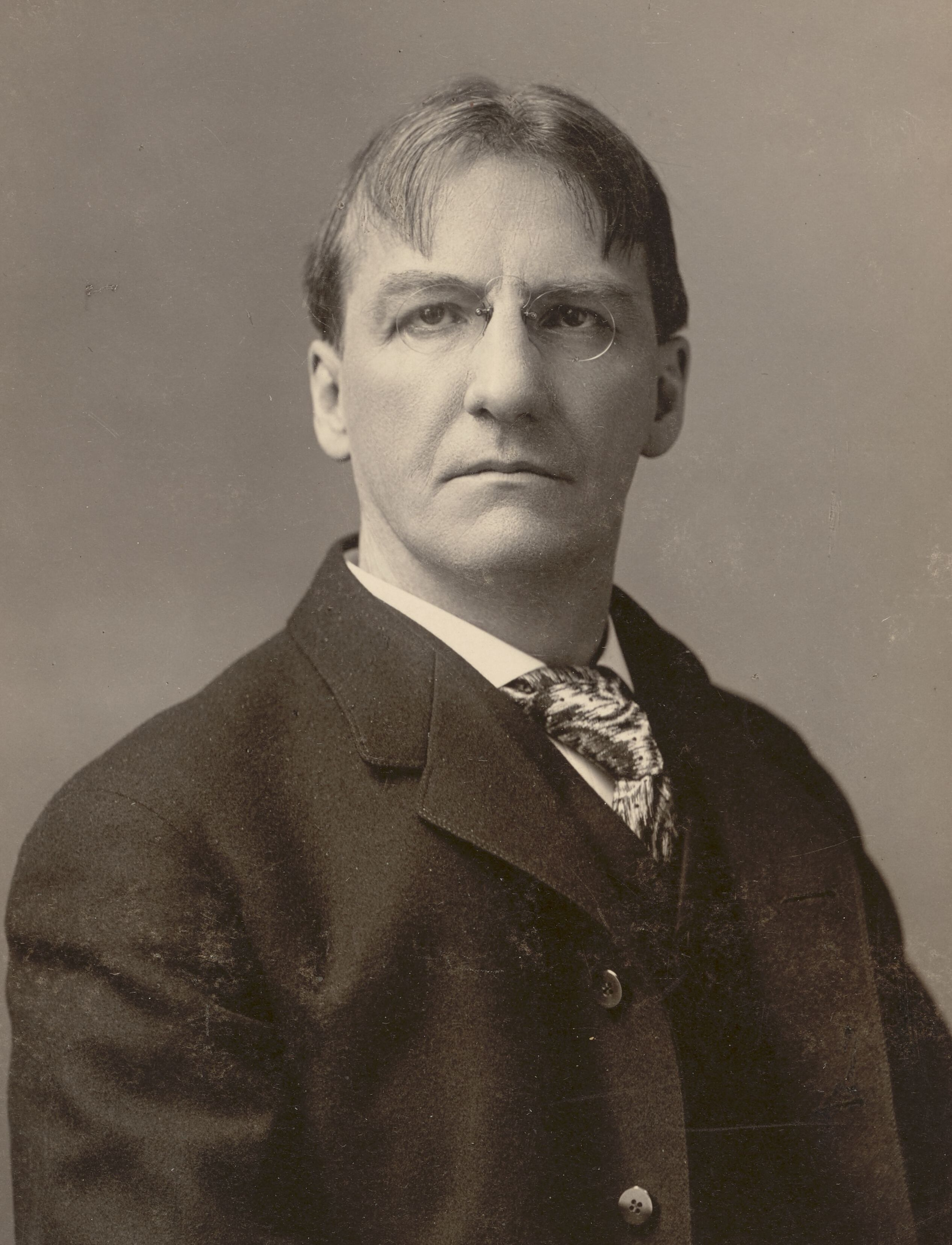

District Attorney of Suffolk County, Massachusetts
- In office December 2, 1905 – February 6, 1909
- Preceded by: Michael J. Sughrue
- Succeeded by: Arthur D. Hill

Personal details
- Born: April 27, 1859 Wakefield, Massachusetts, U.S.
- Died: February 6, 1909 (aged 49) Phoenix, Arizona, U.S.
- Resting place: Holy Cross Cemetery; Malden, Massachusetts
- Party: Independent (1905–06); Prohibition (1906); Democrat (1906–07); Independence League (1906–09)
- Education: Boston University Law School
- Occupation: Lawyer

John B. Moran (April 27, 1859 – February 6, 1909) was an American politician who served as District Attorney of Suffolk County, Massachusetts, from 1905 to 1909.

== Early life ==
Moran was born on April 27, 1859, in Wakefield, Massachusetts, to John and Ellen (Brown) Moran, Irish immigrants who moved to the United States in 1852. He worked his way through school and took three years worth of courses in one year at Boston University Law School. He opened a small law office in Woburn, Massachusetts, but moved to Roxbury after six months due to slow business.

== Political career ==
=== Early involvement ===
After moving to Roxbury, Moran became involved in local politics. During the 1892 election he took the stump for Timothy V. Coakley, Democratic nominee in the Massachusetts Senate's 8th Suffolk District. During the 1895 Boston mayoral election, Moran and Coakley ended up on the opposite sides, with Moran supporting Democrat Josiah Quincy and Coakley supporting Republican Edwin Upton Curtis. The two engaged in a joint debate in front of 4,000 people at the Boston Music Hall. In the 1897 mayoral election, Moran broke with Quincy and supported Thomas Riley, an attorney who as the candidate of the Bryan Democrats, a group of Boston Democrats who "repudiated the Chicago platform".

=== District Attorney ===
In 1898, Moran severely criticized Suffolk County District Attorney Oliver Stevens, who was running for reelection. Moran accused Stevens and his assistants of making decisions based on political influence, requesting unjust sentences, shielding perjurers, and other misdeeds. Stevens was reelected and on March 13, 1899, Moran announced that he would no longer serve as counsel in cases in the Suffolk County Criminal Court, as be believed his opposition to Stevens' reelection made it impossible for him to try cases in that court.

Stevens resigned in 1905 and Moran challenged his appointed successor, Michael J. Sughrue. Sughrue won both the Republican and Democratic nominations, but Moran chose to stay in the race as an independent. Moran ran on a platform opposing graft and, following the death of Susie Geary, vowed to close down abortion clinics. He had no campaign committee, funds, or staff, but upset Sughrue by 4,349 votes to become DA. The New York Times compared his victory to that of William Travers Jerome. He was sworn into office on December 2. Soon after taking office, Moran closed an investigation into alleged plot to kill Martin Lomasney due to a lack of evidence. He also began a crackdown on Boston hotels. He forced the Boston Police Commission to revoke the Hotel Touraine's liquor license for violating a law that prevented the sale of liquor on Sunday. He also demanded that licenses be stripped from Young's Hotel, Parker House, Adams House, and the Hotel Essex for violating the "Screen Law", which prohibited obstructions to view on premises where liquor is sold. The board elected to suspend instead of revoking these licenses.

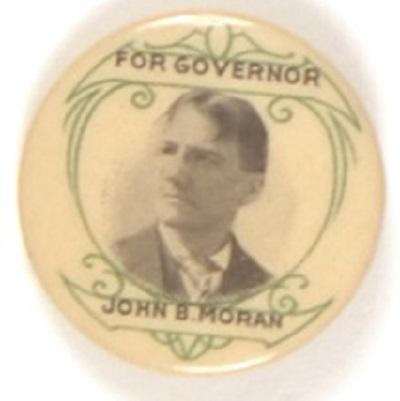
John B. Moran as he appeared on a 1906 political button.

=== Run for Governor ===
On June 28, 1906, Moran won the Prohibition Party's nomination for Governor of Massachusetts. On July 14 he announced that he would seek the Democratic Party's nomination as well. He wanted to create a fusion ticket with anti-machine Republicans and requested the Democrats nominate Republican Eugene N. Foss for Lieutenant Governor. On September 22 he received the nomination of the Independence League, the state's newest political organization. By September 26, Moran had such a large lead in Democratic delegate count that leaders of conservative wing of the party decided that they would not present their candidate, Henry Melville Whitney, at the convention. On October 4, Moran was nominated without opposition at the Democratic convention. The convention also nominated William Jennings Bryan for president, which led to speculation that Moran, who opposed both Bryan and the party's other presidential frontrunner, William Randolph Hearst, would decline the party's nomination. However, on October 12, he announced that he accepted the Democratic nomination in a statement in which he also denounced "Bryanism and Hearstism". On October 18, Moran announced that if he was elected and reelected in 1907, he would challenged both Bryan and Hearst at the 1908 Democratic National Convention.

Moran did not appear at the 1906 Democratic convention due to ill health. His physician informed him that an active campaign, along with working full-time as District Attorney, would result in permanent injury to his already frail condition. Against doctor's advice made multiple speeches a night. He took small quantities of strychnine and coated his throat with cocaine in order to "keep up the action of the heart". On October 16 he fainted following a 55-minute speech at Faneuil Hall. On election day, Moran left Boston in order to rest.

Moran lost to Republican Curtis Guild Jr. 52% to 44%.

=== Reelection as District Attorney ===
Following his defeat in the gubernatorial election, Moran considered running for Governor, Mayor of Boston, or District Attorney in 1907. On March 28, 1907, Moran announced that he would run for reelection as Suffolk County District Attorney. His former lead assistant, Joseph A. Dennison decided to challenge Moran for the Democratic nomination. Dennision defeated Moran 108 to 72 votes at the party convention to win the nomination. However, Moran received the unanimous endorsement of the Independence League. Due to a throat condition, Moran did not make any speeches during the campaign. He was easily reelected, receiving 50,345 votes to the Republican nominee Walter A. Webster's 22,725 and Dennison's 17,932.

== Illness and death ==
From January to February 1908, Moran was a patient at the Fenway Hospital. He then spent several weeks in Waynesville, North Carolina. On June 10 he announced that he had been diagnosed with tuberculosis and needed a change of climate. He left for a sanatorium in Adirondacks on June 12. He was confident that he would recover from the disease and would one day become Governor. He returned to Massachusetts briefly in July but soon moved on to Denver and later Arizona. On February 6, 1909, Moran died in Phoenix, Arizona.

Party political offices
Preceded by Charles W. Bartlett	Democratic nominee for Governor of Massachusetts; 1906	Succeeded by Henry Melville Whitney
First	Independence League nominee for Governor of Massachusetts; 1906	Succeeded by Thomas L. Hisgen
