= George Sangster =

George Sangster may refer to:

- George Sangster (politician) (1845–1915), Scottish-born Australian politician
- George Sangster (ornithologist), Dutch ornithologist

== See also ==
- George Sanger (disambiguation)
