= John C. Park =

American politician

District Attorney of Suffolk County, Massachusetts
- In office 1852–1853
- Preceded by: Samuel D. Parker
- Succeeded by: George P. Sanger

Clerk of the Suffolk Superior Court
- In office 1874–1874
- Preceded by: Henry Homer
- Succeeded by: John P. Manning

Personal details
- Born: June 18, 1804 Boston
- Died: April 21, 1889 (aged 81) Newton, Massachusetts
- Resting place: Forest Hills Cemetery
- Party: Whig (1825–1851); Free Soil (1851–1852); Independent (1852–1855); Republican (1855–1889)
- Spouse(s): Mary F. Moore (1829–1852; her death); Charlotte Cutter Dean (1854–1889; his death)
- Education: Harvard College; Harvard Law School

John Cochran Park (1804–1889) was an American attorney and politician who served as district attorney of Suffolk County, Massachusetts, and a judge of the Newton district court.

== Early life ==
Park was born on June 10, 1804, to Dr. John and Louisa (Adams) Park. He attended Boston public schools and graduated from Harvard College in 1824 and Harvard Law School in 1826. In November 1829, he married Mary F. Moore of Boston. She died in 1852. On November 1, 1854, he married Charlotte Cutter Dean.

== Legal and political career ==
Park was admitted to the bar in 1827. In 1832, he defended Charlotte Williams, an African American teenager accused of poisoning five children in the home where she worked as a housekeeper. She was found not guilty. Park also represented Suffolk County in the Massachusetts General Court for over a decade and was a member of the Boston Common Council in 1835.

On February 4, 1852, Park was appointed Suffolk County district attorney by Governor George S. Boutwell. The following year, Park was removed by Boutwell's successor, John H. Clifford.

In 1874, Park was appointed clerk of the Suffolk Superior Court following the death of Henry Homer. He lost the Republican nomination to William W. Doherty and was succeeded by Homer's assistant, John P. Manning.

In 1864, Park moved to Newton, Massachusetts. He was appointed to a judgeship on the Newton district court by Governor John Davis Long.

== Other work ==
In 1829, Park joined the Ancient and Honorable Artillery Company. He was made an adjutant in 1837, a first lieutenant in 1845, and a captain in 1853. Around 1740, he was named captain of the Boston City Guard. He also served as captain in the Boston Light Infantry.

Park served for a time as president of the Charitable Irish Society of Boston.

== Later life ==
In June 1888, Park suffered partial paralysis and was unable to attend to his judicial duties. He was able to recover enough to return to the bench that winter.

In the 1888 United States presidential election, Park broke with the Republican Party in favor of Democratic incumbent Grover Cleveland.

Park died on April 21, 1889, in Newton. He was survived by his wife and two sons. His funeral was held on April 26 at the Channing Church in Newton. He was buried in Forest Hills Cemetery.
