= Joseph C. Pelletier =

District attorney of Suffolk County, Massachusetts

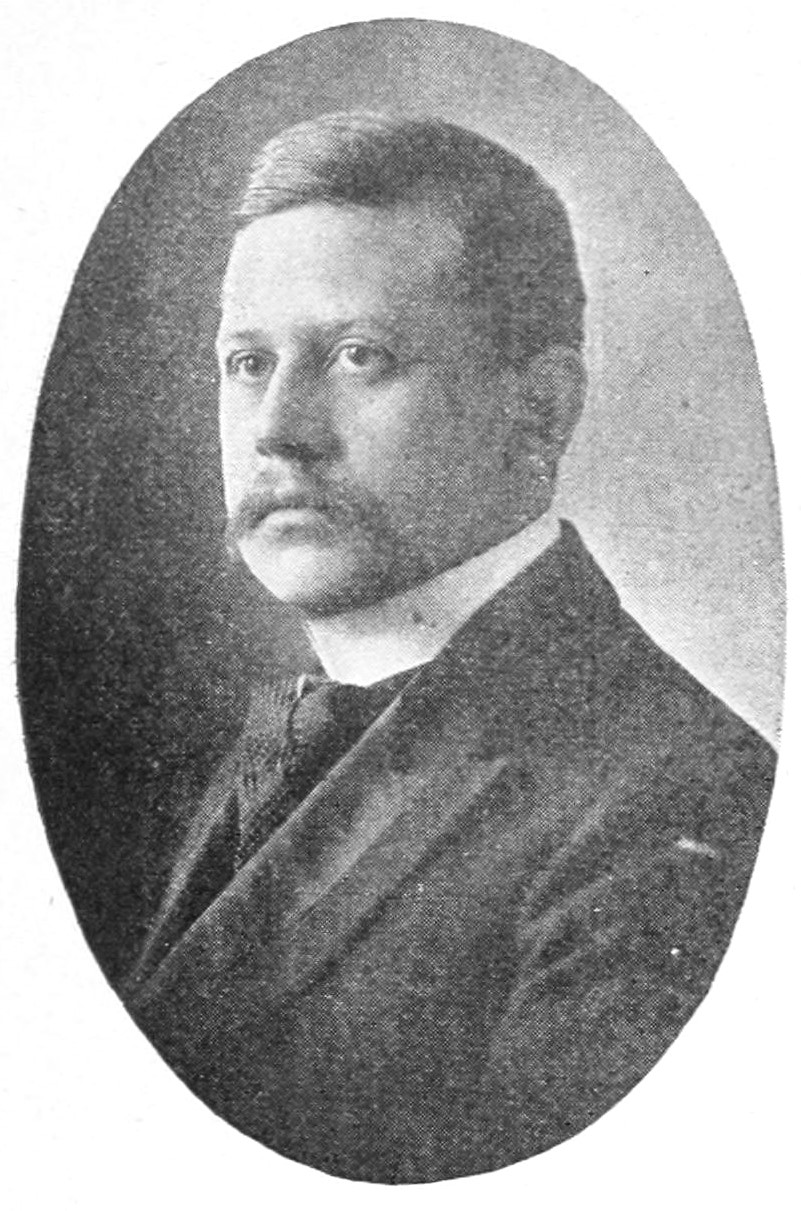

District Attorney of Suffolk County, Massachusetts
- In office 1909–1922
- Preceded by: Arthur D. Hill
- Succeeded by: Thomas C. O'Brien

Supreme Advocate of the Knights of Columbus
- In office 1907–1922
- Preceded by: Patrick L. McArdle
- Succeeded by: Luke E. Hart

Massachusetts State Deputies of the Knights of Columbus
- In office 1901–1906
- Preceded by: James F. Cavanagh
- Succeeded by: Daniel F. Buckley

Personal details
- Born: April 25, 1872 Roxbury, Massachusetts, U.S.
- Died: March 25, 1924 (aged 51) Boston, Massachusetts, U.S.
- Resting place: Forest Hills Cemetery
- Party: Democratic
- Occupation: Lawyer, politician

Joseph C. Pelletier (April 25, 1872 – March 25, 1924) was district attorney of Suffolk County, Massachusetts, the first owner and president of the Boston Red Sox, and the Supreme Advocate of the Knights of Columbus. Despite success as a district attorney in successfully prosecuting Charles Ponzi, he later was removed as district attorney and disbarred for blackmail and extortion.

== Early life ==
Pelletier was born April 25, 1872, in Roxbury, to William Summers Pelletier, a successful merchant and banker described as "a model of goodness in his personal life." He attended the Boston Public Schools and then Boston College where he earned a bachelor's degree in 1891 and a master's degree in 1893. He earned a law degree from Boston University in 1895, the year after he passed the bar exam.

== Knights of Columbus ==
Pelletier was a charter member of Franklin Council number 168 of the Knight of Columbus and its first Deputy Grand Knight when it was instituted on April 26, 1896. In 1898 he was elected Grand Knight and served two terms as District Deputy from 1898 to 1900. He was State Deputy of the Massachusetts Knights of Columbus from 1901 until 1906, during which time he oversaw the institution of the Boston Chapter, a group of Grand Knights who collaborated to work on larger projects. He served five terms as state deputy, more than anyone else. While state deputy, the state convention was held outside of Boston several times, to great success. He was Master of the Fourth Degree in Massachusetts in 1900.

He served as a delegate to the Supreme Convention from 1900 to 1908, and served as a Supreme Director from 1901 to 1907. He provided legal advice to the Order as Supreme Advocate for 15 years, from 1907 to 1922, He also served as a member of the Knights of Columbus Commission on Religious Prejudice. He was a member of the War Activities Committee to provide services for American troops in World War I and, following the war, he was appointed the Education Committee to run a series of night schools for returning veterans. France awarded Pelletier the Legion of Honor and Belgium made him a Knight of the Crown for his services during the war. Pope Benedict XV made him a knight of the Order of St. Gregory the Great. After his death, the Massachusetts state council established a scholarship in his name at Boston College.

He was friends with Supreme Knight Edward L. Hearn.

== Boston Red Sox ==
On August 19, 1901, the first public stock certificate issued by the "Boston American League Base-Ball Club," stock number 1, granted Joseph C. Pelletier eight shares of Capital Stock (worth $800,000) in the team, and was signed by Peltier as the club's first "President." In 1904, Pelletier transferred six of his shares to John I. Taylor, the son of the Boston Globe publisher who owned the Red Sox from 1904 until 1911. See also List of Boston Red Sox owners and executives.

== Public office ==
In 1905, Pelletier was appointed to the Massachusetts Civil Service Commission by Governor William Lewis Douglas. He was reappointed by Republican Governors Curtis Guild Jr. and Eben Sumner Draper. He resigned from the board in 1909 in order to focus on his campaign for district attorney.

Pelletier was first elected as district attorney in 1909. He easily defeated Edward P. Barry, Felix W. McGettrick, and Alonzo D. Moran at the county convention to win the Democratic nomination (receiving 149 of the necessary 117 votes on the first ballot) and beat Republican incumbent Arthur D. Hill in the general election. He took office on November 13, 1909.

In 1911, Pelletier prosecuted Clarence Richeson for the murder of his girlfriend Avis Willard Linnell. Richeson was found guilty and Pelletier recommended the death penalty. Richeson was executed on May 21, 1912.

In 1912, Pelletier was a candidate for governor. He lost the Democratic nomination to incumbent Eugene N. Foss by 16,000 votes.

In 1913, Pelletier directed a grand jury that investigated the Arcadia Hotel fire. The grand jury could not find sufficient evidence for any criminal indictments.

In 1917, Pelletier petitioned Governor Samuel W. McCall for leniency in the treatment of Jesse Pomeroy, who had been living in solitary confinement at the Charlestown State Prison for more than 40 years. Pomeroy's sentence was commuted to the extent of allowing him the privileges afforded to other life prisoners.

In August 1920, as the Suffolk County District Attorney in Boston, Pelletier investigated Charles Ponzi, and caused the downfall of Ponzi’s financial pyramid scheme. Harboring suspicions but lacking tangible proof of wrongdoing, Pelletier nevertheless convinced Ponzi to stop taking on new investments until an auditor examined his accounts, which quickly resulted in the downfall of Ponzi's pyramid scheme (which relied on the continual receipt of new funds from which to pay existing investors), and Ponzi's ultimate criminal conviction.

In 1921, Pelletier was a candidate for Mayor of Boston. He dropped out of the race shortly before the election and backed James Michael Curley.

=== Removal from office ===
In 1916, the Watch and Ward Society began efforts to remove Pelletier from office. According to Pelletier, this was because he refused to present complaints procured by their spotters to a jury. After a complaint to the state legislature's Joint Judiciary Committee was dismissed in the winter of 1916, the society went to the Massachusetts Supreme Judicial Court, which twice found their charges unworthy of a hearing. After this the group took its efforts before the Boston Bar Association. In November 1919, Pelletier discovered his private office in Pemberton Square had been wiretapped. He traced the wires back to an office paid for by Godfrey Lowell Cabot, president of the Watch and Ward Society. Cabot justified the recording device by saying he needed incriminating evidence to remove Pelletier from office. The society had also hired a private detective to keep the district attorney under surveillance for two years. On September 29, 1921, the Boston Bar Association recommended to Massachusetts Attorney General J. Weston Allen that Pelletier be removed from office, alleging that he was guilty of deceit, malpractice, and gross misconduct. The trial began on December 28, 1921, with Senator James A. Reed of Missouri representing Pelletier. Reed claimed that Pelletier was the victim of the Watch and Ward Society's anti-Catholic vendetta. Late in the trial, former Middlesex County district attorney William J. Corcoran turned state's evidence against Pelletier and his co-conspirators. On February 21, 1922, the Massachusetts Supreme Judicial Court found Pelletier guilty of 10 of the 21 charges against him and removed him from office. Chief Justice Arthur Prentice Rugg wrote in the court's opinion that Pelletier had "prostituted" his office and used the processes of law "as instruments of oppression in an attempt to wrest money from the blameless and aged" by repeatedly using his position to aid in blackmail and extortion. Four of these cases involved Pelletier's close friend Daniel H. Coakley. The court described their relationship as "conspirators to exert the power of the district attorney to extort money, to terrorize people into surrendering causes of action and otherwise to abuse that office".

== Later life and death ==
On May 8, 1922, Pelletier was disbarred. On June 29, 1922, he resigned as supreme advocate of the Knights of Columbus, citing "propaganda" from his "enemies outside the order". He was succeeded by Luke E. Hart.

Pelletier sought to return to the district attorney's office in the 1922 election. He defeated his successor, Thomas C. O'Brien by a 2 to 1 margin in the Democratic primary. However, O'Brien, who won the Republican nomination, defeated Pelletier 56% to 42% in the general election.

Pelletier died on March 25, 1924, at his home in Boston. He had been suffering from pneumonia for a week. He was buried in Forest Hills Cemetery.

== Works cited ==
- Lapomarda, Vincent A. (1992). The Knights of Columbus in Massachusetts (second ed.). Norwood, Massachusetts: Knights of Columbus Massachusetts State Council.
- Kauffman, Christopher J. (1982). Faith and Fraternalism: The History of the Knights of Columbus, 1882–1982. Harper and Row. ISBN 978-0-06-014940-6.
