= Robert Riger =

American television director and cinematographer

- Born: Robert Nelson Cooke; June 4, 1924; New York City
- Died: May 19, 1995 (aged 70); Huntington Beach, California
- Education: Pratt Institute
- Known for: Illustration, Photography, Cinematography
- Awards: 9 Emmy Awards, 1994 Sports Artist of the Year

Robert Riger (June 4, 1924 – May 19, 1995) was an American sports illustrator, photographer, award-winning television director, and cinematographer. John Szarkowski, former director of the photography department at the Museum of Modern Art, said, "His photographs are documents, and the best of them are also pictures that now have a life of their own, and that would have given intense pleasure to George Stubbs and Winslow Homer and Thomas Eakins." David Halberstam, said "Robert Riger was the preeminent artist of a golden age of American sports in the years after World War II."

== Early life ==
Born in 1924 in Manhattan, Riger attended The High School of Music & Art, and the United States Merchant Marine Academy, and later earned a BA from Pratt Institute in Brooklyn. After serving three years in the Merchant Marine during World War II, Riger made his first sports drawing in 1945: a scene from an Army-Notre Dame football game. From 1947 to 1949 Riger did magazine layout for Esquire and The Saturday Evening Post, then worked as an advertising art director until 1955, when he became a freelance illustrator. He was a regular contributor to Sports Illustrated since its first month of publication in 1954. During his career, the magazine published more than 1,200 of his editorial drawings and over 200 of his promotional and advertising drawings.

== Photography ==
In 1950, he began taking photographs as a research tool for his drawings. What started as a secondary medium became what Riger was most known for. He described his approach to sports journalism:

You cannot possibly photograph sport unless you understand it completely, and understand and know the men who play it. The same intensity they have to play the game you must have to record it. Not stop it, but suspend it forever in time.

From 1950 to 1994, he copyrighted more than 90,000 master photographic negatives, more than 40,000 of them involving pro football. Many of these photographs appeared in Sports Illustrated, and Riger published two ground-breaking books of sports photo-journalism: The Pros: A Documentary of Professional Football in America (1960) and The American Diamond (1965). In addition to football and baseball, Riger's images cover boxing, horse racing, and all things Olympic. (see Getty Images ) His subjects were celebrated athletes of the day: Ted Williams, Jackie Robinson, Jack Nicklaus, Willie Mays, Johnny Unitas, Frank Gifford, Muhammad Ali, Jim Clark, Eddie Arcaro, Nadia Comăneci, Wilma Rudolph, Pelé and those who coached them Vince Lombardi, Willie Schaeffler among others.

== Television & Film ==
Riger's television career began with Monday morning football analysis on Today on NBC in 1961. In 1963, he began three years of world travel and weekly appearances on ABC's Wide World of Sports, "doing the incisive on-camera picture reporting that preceded the days of color and gave ABC Sports an added dimension to their coverage." At ABC, where he worked from 1963 to 1970 and again from 1977 to 1980, he won nine Emmy awards. He developed his ground breaking slow-motion video work on the broadcasts of the 1968, 1976 and 1984 Summer Olympic Games and the 1980 Winter Olympic Games. As Second Unit Director, Riger was responsible for the acclaimed soccer sequences in the movie Escape to Victory (1981), directed by John Huston, which deals with Allied prisoners of war facing German soccer stars during World War II and starring Sylvester Stallone.

== Books & Exhibitions ==
Riger was also the author and illustrator of over 13 books, many of the early ones for juvenile audiences. In 1963, author Ralph Moody wrote Come On Seabiscuit (ISBN 0-8032-8287-7), which was illustrated by Robert Riger and recently brought back into print by the University of Nebraska Press. It served as an inspiration for Laura Hillenbrand. On the radio show Fresh Air with Terry Gross on July 29, 2003, Hillenbrand said of Moody's book:

When I was about seven years old. . . . I found a children's book called Come on Seabiscuit! which was just wonderful! I read it so many times I broke the spine and all the pages fell out. I still have it; it has to be wrapped in rubber bands because the pages will go everywhere. But that book in just vivid prose told the story of the horse.

A month before he died in 1995, Riger completed his last book, The Sports Photography of Robert Riger (Random House), and finished preparation for a definitive exhibit of his photography at the James Danziger Gallery in New York City. In April, Riger taped an appearance on 'Charlie Rose' discussing his entire career.

== Family ==
Riger was the son of Harry St. John Cooke and Irene Teresa Riger of New York city. He first married Eleanor Sanger (the first U.S. woman television sports producer) in 1950 and had four children by their marriage, Christopher Riger, (1951- ), Victoria Riger Phillips, (1952- ), Robert Paris Riger (1960-2018), and Charlotte Irene Riger, (1963- ). His second marriage was to the writer Dawn Aberg; their children are Ariel Aberg-Riger (1981- ) and John Maxwell Aberg-Riger (1983- ).

== Sources ==
- The Sports Photography of Robert Riger, Random House, 1995
- Midships, 1945, U.S. Merchant Marine Cadet Corps, Training Organization, War Shipping Administration. p. 58.
- Victory on Hollywood.com,
