= George W. Cooley =

American lawyer

Commonwealth Attorney of Suffolk County, Massachusetts
- In office September 5, 1854 – February 4, 1861
- Preceded by: George P. Sanger
- Succeeded by: George P. Sanger

Personal details
- Born: July 28, 1811 Deerfield, Massachusetts
- Died: October 26, 1869 (aged 58) Somerville, Massachusetts
- Party: Whig
- Occupation: Lawyer

George W. Cooley (July 28, 1811 – October 26, 1869) was an American lawyer and politician who served as Commonwealth Attorney of Suffolk County, Massachusetts.

== Early life ==
Cooley was born on July 28, 1811, in Deerfield, Massachusetts. In 1835 he was admitted to the Maine bar. He later moved from Bangor, Maine, to Boston and on April 13, 1843, he was admitted to the Suffolk County bar. In 1854 he represented Boston in the Massachusetts House of Representatives.

== District attorney ==
On September 5, 1854, he was appointed Commonwealth Attorney of Suffolk County to succeed George P. Sanger, who was appointed judge of the Court of Common Pleas. In 1860, Cooley was committed to the McLean Asylum for the Insane. On January 14, 1861, Massachusetts Attorney General Stephen Henry Phillips petitioned the Massachusetts Supreme Judicial Court at the behest of Governor John Albion Andrew for Cooley's removal on the grounds that he was unable to perform the duties of his office due to "derangement and enfeebling of the intellect". It was the first time in the history of the Commonwealth that the Attorney General had petitioned for the removal of a district attorney. As Cooley was confined to the asylum, the court appointed Benjamin Butler to serve as his guardian ad litem. On February 4, 1861, the Court removed Cooley from office.

Cooley died on October 26, 1869, at McLean Asylum.
