= Charles Robert Sanger =

American chemist and academic

- Professor C. R. Sanger, Harvard, 1902
- Born: August 31, 1860; Boston, Massachusetts
- Died: February 25, 1912 (aged 51)
- Education: Harvard College
- Known for: Discovery of arsenic gas in wallpaper
- Spouses: Almira Starkweather Horswell (1886–1905), Eleanor Whitney Davis (1910–1912).
- Scientific career
- Workplaces: Washington University in St. Louis
- Doctoral advisor: H.B. Hill

Charles Robert Sanger (1860–1912) was a chemist and professor at Harvard University whose research centered on detecting and curing the causes of illness caused by chemicals in the home.

== Early life ==
Sanger was born on August 31, 1860, in Boston, Massachusetts, the son of George Partridge Sanger (1819–1890) and Elizabeth Sherburne (Thompson) (1819–1897). His father, a Harvard graduate, was a lawyer, editor, judge, first president of the John Hancock Mutual Life Insurance Company and United States attorney for Massachusetts between 1873 and 1886. Sanger's mother was born in Portsmouth, New Hampshire. His great-grandfather, Thomas Thompson, was a U.S. naval captain who was the first to engage in a maritime battle during the Revolutionary War. The family moved to Cambridge, where Charles attended Cambridge High School before beginning at Harvard in 1877.

Sanger's three elder brothers attended Harvard before him: John White, class of 1870; William Thompson, 1871, and George Partridge, 1874. In addition, his great-grandfather, Zedekiah Sanger had graduated in 1771, and his grandfather, Ralph Sanger in 1808. In 1857 Harvard awarded Ralph Sanger an honorary doctor of divinity degree. Sanger's son graduated in the Harvard class of 1915.

Charles Robert Sanger earned a Bachelor of Arts degree in 1881 and his first Master of Arts degree in 1882. He studied for a year at universities in Munich and Bonn under organic chemist Richard Anchütz. He returned to Harvard to receive a second Master of Arts and a doctorate in philosophy. After obtaining his Ph.D., Sanger became an assistant in the Harvard chemistry department, working with Henry B. Hill, who "was his Chemical father."

== Naval Academy ==
In 1886, Sanger was appointed as a chemistry professor at the United States Naval Academy in Annapolis, Maryland. He married Almira (Myra) Starkweather Horswell (1857–1905) the same year. The Sangers had two children while living in Annapolis, Mary in 1888 and Eleanor Sherburne in 1891. Sanger left Annapolis in 1892 to become Eliot Professor of Chemistry at Washington University in St. Louis. In addition he was professor of chemistry at the St. Louis Medical College and the Missouri Dental College, the medical and dental departments of Washington University. A son, Richard Sanger, was born there in 1894.

In 1891, Sanger published a paper that stemmed from work he had begun with Hill during his doctoral study: "The Quantitative Determination of Arsenic by the Berzelius-Marsh Process, especially as Applied to the Analysis of Wallpaper and Fabrics."

Sanger is best known for his work on arsenic poisoning of people exposed to arsenic-containing wallpaper, carpets and other house furnishings. Using his improved analytical methods, he showed that arsenic levels found in human tissues and excreta were directly correlated with exposure to arsenic-containing materials. The transfer of arsenic from arsenic to wallpaper to human beings was a further mystery. While removal of the wallpaper resulted in disappearance of toxic symptoms, painting over the wallpaper did not. The source of toxicity was arsine (arsenic hydride), an extremely toxic gas formed on reduction of the nonvolatile arsenates present in wallpaper. He thus confirmed the discovery by the Italian chemist Gosio that mold growing on an arsenic-containing substrate generated an arsenical gas the arsenine-forming fungus could live even on the painted surface, its cells reaching into the underlying wallpaper. "In attacking the subject he determined, with characteristic love, of truth, to place it on a secure experimental foundation by looking for arsenic in the excreta of people suffering from the disorders commonly attributed to poison from wallpapers."

== Harvard ==
Sanger returned to Harvard in 1899 as an assistant professor in charge of the large Chemistry 3 course developed by H.B. Hill, who by this time was ailing, and was made full professor and director of the chemistry laboratory when Hill died in 1903.

As a teacher he was somewhat austere; all his students were expected to live fully up to his own standard, and he always retained some touch of the Naval discipline. In particular research with him was no easy matter — the same accuracy, the same thoroughness, the same limitless patience, that he showed in his own work he demanded of his students, but, as they saw he required nothing from them, which he did not exact from himself in even greater measure, they worked with enthusiasm, and felt for him an affection perhaps even deeper and stronger, than would have been inspired by an easier teacher.

Sanger's wife, Almira, died in 1905, and in 1910 he married Eleanor Whitney Davis (1867–1935). She was the daughter of writer Andrew McFarland Davis, and the granddaughter of John Davis, Massachusetts governor and U.S. senator.

Sanger was a fellow of the American Academy of Arts and Sciences. He was also a member of the American Chemical Society, the Deutsche Chemische Gesellschaft, and the Chemical Industry of London.

== Illness ==
The last years of Sanger's life were plagued with an undiagnosed illness — thought either to be related to a nervous cause or an unknown heart condition. He did everything possible to alleviate it, including making a trip to Europe in 1910, which was cut off after six months, as his symptoms were getting worse. "At times it had the symptoms and agonizing pain of angina pectoris; at others, it seemed to be an acute nervous dyspepsia; in the end it was shown to be an organic disease of the heart."

The student view is reported in the Harvard Crimson's obituary of Sanger: "Throughout the fall Professor Sanger's health has been such as has brought with the continued strain of his work physical pain that at times approached torture." In its obituary, the Boston Globe said, "The death of Professor Sanger takes from the Harvard faculty one of its most distinguished scholars and teachers."

Sanger died at home in Cambridge on February 25, 1912. He is buried in the family plot at Mount Auburn Cemetery in Cambridge.

== Publications ==
Chemical Papers of C. R. Sanger:

- "Ueber substituirte Brenzschleimsäuren.'' With Henry B. Hill. Ann Chem. Pharm 232, 43 (1885)
- "The Quantitative Determination of Arsenic by the Berzelius-Marsh Process, especially as applied to the analysis of Wall Papers and Fabrics." Proc. American Aca., 26, 24 (1891).
- "The Chemical Analysis of three Guns at the U.S Naval Academy captured in Corea," by Rear Admiral John Rodgers, U.S.N. Proc. U. S. Naval Institute, 19, 53, (1892).
- "On the formation of volatile Compounds of Arsenic from Arsenical Wallpapers." Proc. Amer. Academy 29, (1894)
- "On Chronic Arsenical Poisoning from Wall Papers and Fabrics," Proc Amer Academy 29, 148 (1894)
- Laboratory Experiments in General Chemistry, St. Louis, Published by the author, St. Louis, (1896).
- A Short Course of Experiments in General Chemistry, with notes on Qualitative Analysis. Published by the author, St. Louis, (1896).
