= Eleanor Sanger =

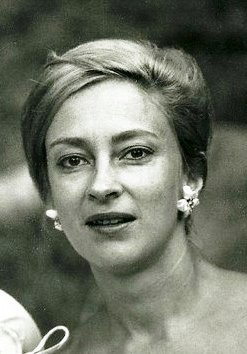
- Sanger in 1961
- Born: Mary Eleanor Sanger; September 15, 1929; Hong Kong
- Died: March 7, 1993 (aged 63); Tisbury, Massachusetts
- Education: Smith College, Columbia University
- Known for: Television Producer, Sports, Writing
- Movement: Women's Sports, Women in Television
- Awards: 7 Emmy Awards, Smith College Medal

Eleanor Sanger (September 15, 1929 – March 7, 1993) was a 7-time Emmy-award-winning television writer and producer, who was the first woman Network Sports Producer.

"Women television producers are still as rare as Howard Cosell's silences, but at least one has begun to break through the double barriers of televised sports. That rarity is Eleanor (Sanger) Riger, the lone distaff on any network sports team." The New York Times, January 8, 1974.

== Background and education ==
Born in Hong Kong in 1929, Sanger was the daughter of Richard Sanger (1894–1957) and Lonni Wheeler, née Wernicke (1891–1987). Her father was a sales executive for Standard Oil of California posted in the Orient for almost 30 years. Her mother was a native of Berlin, Germany. In Hong Kong, Sanger attended the Peak School, and later the British Central School. When the family was at home in Cambridge, Massachusetts she attended what is now the Buckingham Browne & Nichols School. In 1950 Sanger graduated Phi Beta Kappa, magna cum laude from Smith College, with a degree in Government. In 1952 she completed post-graduate work at the Russian Institute (now The Harriman Institute), at Columbia University.

== Early career ==
From 1957-60, Sanger was the Manager of Public Affairs, at Station WNBC-TV, New York City. She told the New York Times later that "'the only place women were allowed then was in Religious Programming,' noting that when she quit as WNBC's manager of Public Affairs in 1961 she was replaced in the job by two men each making twice as much as she had." During the same period, she was also the Associate Producer (1957–1960) and Producer (1960–1963) of The Open Mind, Richard Heffner's award winning series that celebrated its 50th year on the air in 2006. In 1966, Sanger went into Sports as the Manager of Client Relations and Associate Producer for ABC Sports where she stayed until 1970—with a stint as a writer on ABC News in 1967. From 1970 to 1973, Sanger was a Producer Writer for Tomorrow Entertainment producing various documentaries, including "Day of the Big Horn" starring John Denver, Tommy Tompkins, and the elusive Big horn sheep themselves.

== First woman sports producer ==
It took a Title IX challenge by the National Organization for Women of ABC's allegedly discriminatory hiring and programming practices, and a long-standing working relationship with the head of Sports, Roone Arledge, for Sanger to be re-hired by ABC Sports as a full-fledged Producer, Writer, and Director in 1973; a post she held full-time through 1986. This assignment began in 1974 with a focus on women in sports, including a $200,000 prime-time Women's Sports special sponsored by Colgate, narrated by Dinah Shore, featuring Billie Jean King, Olga Korbut, jockey Robin Smyth and The Princess Anne. Sanger's association with women's sports continued, including her mentoring of other women in the business, passing along her belief that you could succeed without imitating your male counterparts.

Interviewed in 1974 by the New York Times, Sanger's closing quote was "I'll leave the football games to the guys," she said, "They do them fine." She had it wrong, eventually winning an Emmy Award for her coverage of NCAA football in 1988. In fact during her ABC career there wasn't a sport, played by men or women, (including the Scottish Highland Games) that Sanger didn't produce. In addition, Sanger's trips to China and North Korea covering ping pong tournaments, made her a unique academic resource on how the Western media was treated early on.

== Emmy Award-winning Olympic Games ==
Sanger received six Emmy Awards, for her work as Producer on the Winter and Summer Olympics: 1968 – Grenoble, France and Mexico City, Mexico; 1976, Innsbruck, Austria and Montreal, Canada; 1984 – Sarajevo, Yugoslavia and Los Angeles, California. Producer Winter Olympics 1980, Lake Placid, USA. Producer Bobsled and Luge competition, 1988, Calgary, Canada. Producer Equestrian Events, NBC Sports, Summer Olympics, Seoul South Korea, 1988.

== Smith College Medal ==
Sanger received the Smith College Medal in 1982, awarded to "those alumnae who, in the judgment of the trustees, exemplify in their lives and work the true purpose of a liberal arts education." From 1991 to 1993 Sanger sat on the Smith College Medal Committee. Sanger's papers are part of the Sophia Smith Collection at Smith.

Sanger was a member of the Advisory Board of the Women's Sports Foundation, she was a Member of the Academy of Television Arts and Sciences, Writers Guild of America, and the Directors Guild of America. She was a founding Editor of Ms. Magazine (1972), and on the Advisory Board of the National Women's Conference to Prevent Nuclear War (1974). Finally, she was Chairman of the Advisory Board of the Media Arts Department at the University of Arizona from 1990 to 1993.

== Family ==
In 1950, Sanger married sports illustrator and photographer Robert Nelson Riger (June 4, 1924 – May 19, 1995). They had four children: Christopher Robin Riger (1951); Victoria Eleanor Riger (1952); Robert Paris Riger (1960); Charlotte Irene Riger (1963). Sanger's sister, Helen Sanger, who was born in Java, lived in New York city until her death on 30 July 2020; her eldest sister (Lonni) Charlotte Sanger Ward, died on 12 August 1955. Sanger and Riger divorced in 1981, and she remarried in 1984, to Peter L. Keys; they moved first to the Cotswolds in England where Sanger produced weekly US Football games for British television, she then returned to live in Tucson, Arizona. Before she died of cancer in 1993, Sanger moved back to Martha's Vineyard, a place she first visited in the 1930s and 40s, where she was married to Riger, and summered in Edgartown and later West Tisbury.

Sanger and Riger are buried side by side in Village Cemetery, West Tisbury, Massachusetts on Martha's Vineyard.
