= John Wilder May =

American jurist and judge (1819–1883)

Chief Justice of the Boston Municipal Court
- In office 1878–1883
- Preceded by: Mellen Chamberlain
- Succeeded by: William E. Parmenter

District Attorney of Suffolk County, Massachusetts
- In office 1869–1875
- Preceded by: George P. Sanger
- Succeeded by: Oliver Stevens

Personal details
- Born: January 28, 1819 Attleboro, Massachusetts
- Died: January 11, 1883 (aged 63) Dorchester
- Party: Republican
- Spouse: Elizabeth Thurston Farnham (1859–1883; his death)
- Education: University of Vermont

John Wilder May (1819–1883) was an American jurist who served as chief justice of the Boston Municipal Court and District Attorney of Suffolk County, Massachusetts.

== Early life ==
May was born on January 28, 1819, in Attleboro, Massachusetts to Lemuel and Esther Wilder May. His father served as a member of the Massachusetts Governor's Council and both chambers of the Massachusetts General Court. May graduated from Phillips Academy and the University of Vermont. After college, May farmed for a couple of years before returning to Attleboro to work as a school teacher.

In 1850, May married Elizabeth Thurston Farnham, a cousin from Bangor, Maine. They had four children - Henry Farnham May, Harriet Wilder May, John Lemuel May and Elizabeth Farnham May.

== Legal career ==
May studied law in the office of Francis Hilliard in Roxbury, Massachusetts. He was admitted to the bar on September 1, 1851, and started his own practice in Roxbury. He became involved in politics as well. He represented Ward 3 the Roxbury common council in 1857, was city solicitor for a time, and in 1867 represented the community in the Massachusetts House of Representatives. After Roxbury was annexed by Boston, May formed a partnership with Charles W. Story.

In 1869, May was elected District Attorney of Suffolk County. He was appointed Chief Justice of the Boston Municipal Court on October 12, 1878. He remained on the bench until his death on January 11, 1883.
