= Michael J. Sughrue =

American attorney (1857–1926)

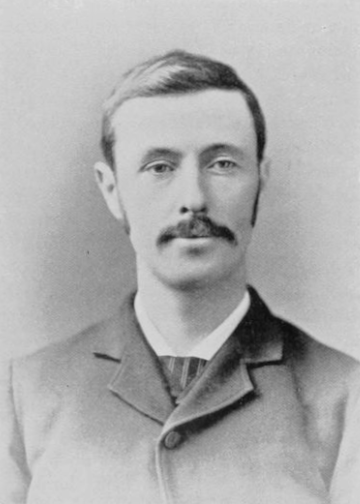

District Attorney of Suffolk County, Massachusetts
- In office August 2, 1905 – December 2, 1905
- Preceded by: Oliver Stevens
- Succeeded by: John B. Moran

Personal details
- Born: August 27, 1857 Nashua, New Hampshire
- Died: April 15, 1926 (aged 68) Boston, Massachusetts
- Spouse: Elizabeth F. Quinn (m. 1891)
- Education: Boston University (LLB)
- Occupation: Lawyer

Michael J. Sughrue (1857–1926) was an American attorney who served as District Attorney of Suffolk County, Massachusetts in 1905.

== Early life ==
Sughrue was born on August 27, 1857, in Nashua, New Hampshire. During his youth, his family moved to Charlestown and attended Boston Public Schools. He returned to Nashua to attend Crosby Academy and in 1888 he graduated from the Boston University School of Law. On June 22, 1891, he married Elizabeth F. Quinn of Boston. They had four sons and five daughters.

== Legal career ==
=== District attorney ===
In 1891, Sughrue became an assistant district attorney under Oliver Stevens. He also worked as a librarian at the Social Law Library. On August 2, 1905, Stevens resigned and Governor William Lewis Douglas appointed Sughrue to succeed him. The Massachusetts Governor's Council suspended its rules and immediately confirmed Sughrue. He ran for a full term in 1906 and won both the Democratic and Republican nominations. However he lost to Independent candidate John B. Moran by 4,349 votes.

=== Private practice ===
Following his defeat, Sughrue became legal counsel for the Boston Elevated Railway. From 1907 to 1908 he was counsel for the Boston Finance Committee during its investigation into the purchase of supplies by the city. He left this position after he was appointed public administrator for Suffolk County by Governor Curtis Guild Jr.

Sughrue died on April 15, 1926, at his home in Boston.
