= Arthur D. Hill =

American attorney

District Attorney of Suffolk County, Massachusetts
- In office February 24, 1909 – November 13, 1909
- Preceded by: John B. Moran
- Succeeded by: Joseph C. Pelletier

Corporation Counsel for the City of Boston
- In office 1919–1922
- Preceded by: Alexander Whiteside
- Succeeded by: E. Mark Sullivan

Personal details
- Born: June 25, 1869 Paris
- Died: November 29, 1947 (aged 78) Port Chester, New York
- Party: Republican; Progressive Party (1912-1915)
- Education: Harvard College; Harvard Law School
- Occupation: Attorney

Arthur Dehon Hill (June 25, 1869 – November 29, 1947) was an American lawyer who served as District Attorney of Suffolk County, Massachusetts, and was a defense counsel for Sacco and Vanzetti.

== Early life ==
Hill was born on June 25, 1869, in Paris while his parents, Adams Sherman Hill and Caroline Inches (Dehon) Hill were on vacation. He grew up in Boston and attended Browne & Nichols School, Harvard College, and Harvard Law School. He began practicing law following his graduation in 1894. In 1895 he married Henrietta Post McLean, the daughter of General Nathaniel McLean. They had three children.

== Early legal career ==
Hill was a partner of the firm Hill, Barlow, Bangs & Homans. In November 1904 he represented the Massachusetts Institute of Technology during the "Tech riots". In 1908 he was appointed receiver for the American Insurance Company. Hill was also an active member of the bar association and specialized in disbarment proceedings against lawyers in Suffolk County.

== Political career ==
During the 1906 gubernatorial campaign, Hill frequently spoke against the Democratic nominee John B. Moran's record as district attorney. He was the favorite for the Republican nomination for district attorney in 1907, but chose not to enter the race. Moran died in 1909 and Governor Eben Sumner Draper appointed Hill to fill the vacancy. He took office on February 24, 1909. During his tenure as DA, Hill secured the convictions of a former president of the Boston Common Council (Leo F. McCullough), a former Boston Alderman (George H. Battis) and the former head of the city's supply department (Michael J. Mitchell). He was defeated in the 1909 election by Democrat Joseph C. Pelletier. Pelletier kept Hill on as a special counsel on the "Steel Cases", which involved alleged collusive bidding between the city's structural steel corporations. The trial ended with an acquittal. After leaving office, Hill served as a professor at Harvard Law School.

In the 1912 United States presidential election, Hill backed Theodore Roosevelt over William Howard Taft. He joined the Progressive Party and spoke frequently for its 1913 gubernatorial candidate, Charles Sumner Bird. Hill returned to the Republican party in 1915 to stump for gubernatorial nominee Samuel W. McCall. In 1917, Hill was a candidate for at-large delegate to the Massachusetts Constitutional convention, but lost to Charles F. Choate Jr. after a recount.

During World War I, Hill served as a judge advocate general in the United States Army. He was commissioned as a major in December 1917 and served in France from January 1918 to June 1919, during which time he handled property damage claims made by French citizens against the U.S. Army. He mustered out with the rank of Lieutenant Colonel. From 1919 to 1922, Hill was corporation counsel for the City of Boston.

On June 1, 1923, Hill returned to the district attorney's office, this time as an assistant to Thomas C. O'Brien. He was assigned a number of notable cases, including the blackmail case against William J. Corcoran and the banking law violation case against John H. H. McNamee of the Prudential Trust Company. Hill never intended to be a permanent member of O'Brien's staff and left in 1924.

== Sacco and Vanzetti ==
In 1923, Hill served as counsel for Sacco and Vanzetti during their petitions for a new trial. He successfully got Sacco declared insane and committed to Bridgewater State Hospital.

In 1927, Hill returned to the case as chief defense counsel, replacing William G. Thompson and Herbert B. Ehrmann. The Massachusetts Supreme Judicial Court rejected all of the defense's pleas and efforts to have the case heard in federal court were unsuccessful.

== Later life ==
Hill spent his later years as a partner with the firm Hill, Barlow, Goodale, and Wiswall. He died on November 29, 1947, while visiting his daughter in Port Chester, New York.
