= George P. Sanger =

American politician

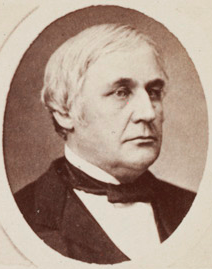

United States Attorney for the District of Massachusetts
- In office 1873–1882
- Preceded by: David H. Mason
- Succeeded by: George M. Stearns

Member of the Massachusetts House of Representatives
- In office 1873

District Attorney of Suffolk County, Massachusetts
- In office 1861–1869
- Preceded by: George W. Cooley
- Succeeded by: John Wilder May
- In office 1853–1854
- Preceded by: John C. Park
- Succeeded by: George W. Cooley

Member of the Boston Common Council
- In office 1860

Judge of the Massachusetts Court of Common Pleas
- In office 1854–1859

Member of the Charlestown Board of Aldermen
- In office 1851–1853

Member of the Charlestown Common Council
- In office 1849–1850

Personal details
- Born: November 27, 1819 Dover, Massachusetts, U.S.
- Died: July 3, 1890 (aged 70) Swampscott, Massachusetts, U.S.
- Spouse: Elizabeth Sherburne Thompson
- Education: Harvard University; Harvard Law School
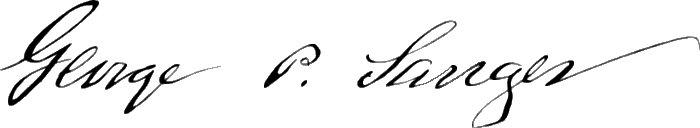
- Signature

George Partridge Sanger (November 27, 1819 – July 3, 1890) was an American lawyer, editor, judge, and businessman who served as the United States Attorney for the District of Massachusetts from 1873 to 1886 and was the first president of the John Hancock Mutual Life Insurance Company.

== Early life ==
Sanger was born on November 27, 1819, in Dover, Massachusetts. He graduated from Harvard University in 1840 and after spending two years as a teacher in Portsmouth, New Hampshire, returned to Harvard as a Latin tutor and a law student.

== Legal career ==
Sanger graduated from Harvard Law School in 1844 and was admitted to the bar in 1846. He spent the next three years practicing law in Boston, first with Stephen Henry Phillips, and later with Charles G. Davis. In 1849, Sanger was named Assistant United States Attorney for the District of Massachusetts.

Sanger was a member of the Charlestown Common Council from 1849 to 1850, and the Board of Aldermen from 1851 to 1853.

In January 1853, he was appointed to the staff of Governor John H. Clifford. In September of that year he was appointed District Attorney for Suffolk County, Massachusetts. The following year he was appointed Judge of the Massachusetts Court of Common Pleas. He remained on the bench until the Court was abolished in 1859.

In 1860, he was a member of the Boston Common Council.

From 1861 to 1869, Sanger again served as District Attorney for Suffolk County, Massachusetts.

In 1873, he was a member of the Massachusetts House of Representatives. Following the death of David H. Mason, President Ulysses S. Grant appointed Sanger United States Attorney for the District of Massachusetts. He remained in this role until 1882.

== Editor ==
Sanger worked for Little, Brown and Company, where he was responsible for editing the Law Reporter and The United States Statutes at Large.

From 1842 to 1860, he was the editor of the American Almanac.

== John Hancock Insurance ==
On October 14, 1862, the John Hancock Mutual Life Insurance Company's Board of Directors elected Sanger the first president of the company. He held this position until August 1863.

== Personal life ==
Sanger married Elizabeth Sherburne Thompson of Portsmouth, New Hampshire, in 1846. The couple had four sons:

- John White Sanger
- William Thompson Sanger
- George Partridge Sanger Jr.
- Charles Robert Sanger.

== Death ==
Sanger died on July 3, 1890, in Swampscott, Massachusetts.
