= Oliver Stevens =

American politician (1825–1905)

District Attorney of Suffolk County, Massachusetts
- In office 1875–1905
- Preceded by: John Wilder May
- Succeeded by: Michael J. Sughrue

President of the Boston Common Council
- In office 1856–1857
- Preceded by: Joseph Story
- Succeeded by: Samuel Wallace Waldron

Member of the Boston Common Council from Ward 4
- In office 1856–1857

Personal details
- Born: June 22, 1825 North Andover, Massachusetts
- Died: August 23, 1905 (aged 80) North Andover, Massachusetts
- Party: Democratic
- Spouse: Catherine Stevens m.1854
- Education: Harvard College; Harvard Law School

Oliver Stevens (1825–1905) was an American attorney and politician who served as District Attorney of Suffolk County, Massachusetts, from 1875 to 1905 and as president of the Boston Common Council in 1856 and 1857.

== Early life ==
Stevens was born on June 22, 1825, in North Andover, Massachusetts, to Isaac Stevens and Hannah Stevens (née Cummings). He was a member of one of North Andover's founding families. His older brother, Isaac Stevens, was the first Governor of Washington Territory and a Union Army General who was killed during the Battle of Chantilly. Stevens grew up on the family farm, which supplied dairy to be sold in Lawrence, Massachusetts.

Stevens prepared for college at the North Yarmouth Academy and graduated from Bowdoin College in 1848. He studied law at Harvard Law School and in the office of H. H. Fuller. He was admitted to the bar in 1850.

== Personal life ==
Stevens moved to Boston in 1850, but continued to utilize his family home in North Andover as a summer home. Stevens was a Unitarian and attended the church of Edward Everett Hale. In 1854, he married a cousin, Catherine Stevens of Andover, Massachusetts. They had no children. On September 2, 1895, Stevens and his wife were severely injured when they were ejected from their carriage. Stevens fractured several of his ribs, and Catherine Stevens broke two bones in her right leg and suffered injuries to her hip and chest.

== Early political career ==
Stevens served on the Boston common council from ward 4 in 1856 and 1857 and was president of the body in both years.

Stevens was a delegate to the 1860 Democratic National Conventions in Charleston and Baltimore, where he supported the candidacy of Stephen A. Douglas. After the first convention, sixteen members of the Massachusetts delegation, including Caleb Cushing, Benjamin Butler, James Scollay Whitney, and George B. Loring, broke with the party and participated in the “Breckinridge convention". At the Baltimore convention, Stevens served as the spokesman for the Massachusetts delegation, which supported the eventual nominee – Stephen A. Douglas.

== District attorney ==
In 1874, Stevens was elected District Attorney of Suffolk County. In 1876, he tried Thomas W. Piper, also known as The Boston Belfry Murderer, for the murder of Mabel H. Young. The trial ended in a hung jury, with nine voting to convict and three voting to acquit. Piper was later tried and convicted by Massachusetts Attorney General Charles R. Train.

On March 1, 1882, Stevens, under instruction from Massachusetts attorney general George Marston, wrote to James R. Osgood & Co. informing them that their 1881 printing of Walt Whitman's Leaves of Grass violated the law against obscene literature and requesting that they withdraw it from circulation. On March 23, Osgood & Co. wrote to Whitman that if two poems – "A Woman Waits for Me" and "Ode to a Common Prostitute", were removed, the government would allow the book to be published. Whitman rejected this request and Osgood & Co., not wanting to get involved with a lawsuit, ceased publishing the book and turned over the plates to Whitman. Rees, Welsh, & Co. (which was soon acquired by David McKay Publications) of Philadelphia agreed to publish the Leaves of Grass and the controversy surrounding the book made it a financial success.

By January 1905, Stevens was unable to do much work due to rheumatism. He spent the entire summer at his farm in North Andover. On July 31, 1905, Stevens resigned effective to the confirmation of his successor. On August 2, Stevens' first assistant Michael J. Sughrue was appointed by Governor William Lewis Douglas and immediately confirmed by the Massachusetts Governor's Council. Stevens died on August 23, 1905, at his home in North Andover.
