= Arcadia Hotel fire =

1913 hotel fire in Boston, Massachusetts

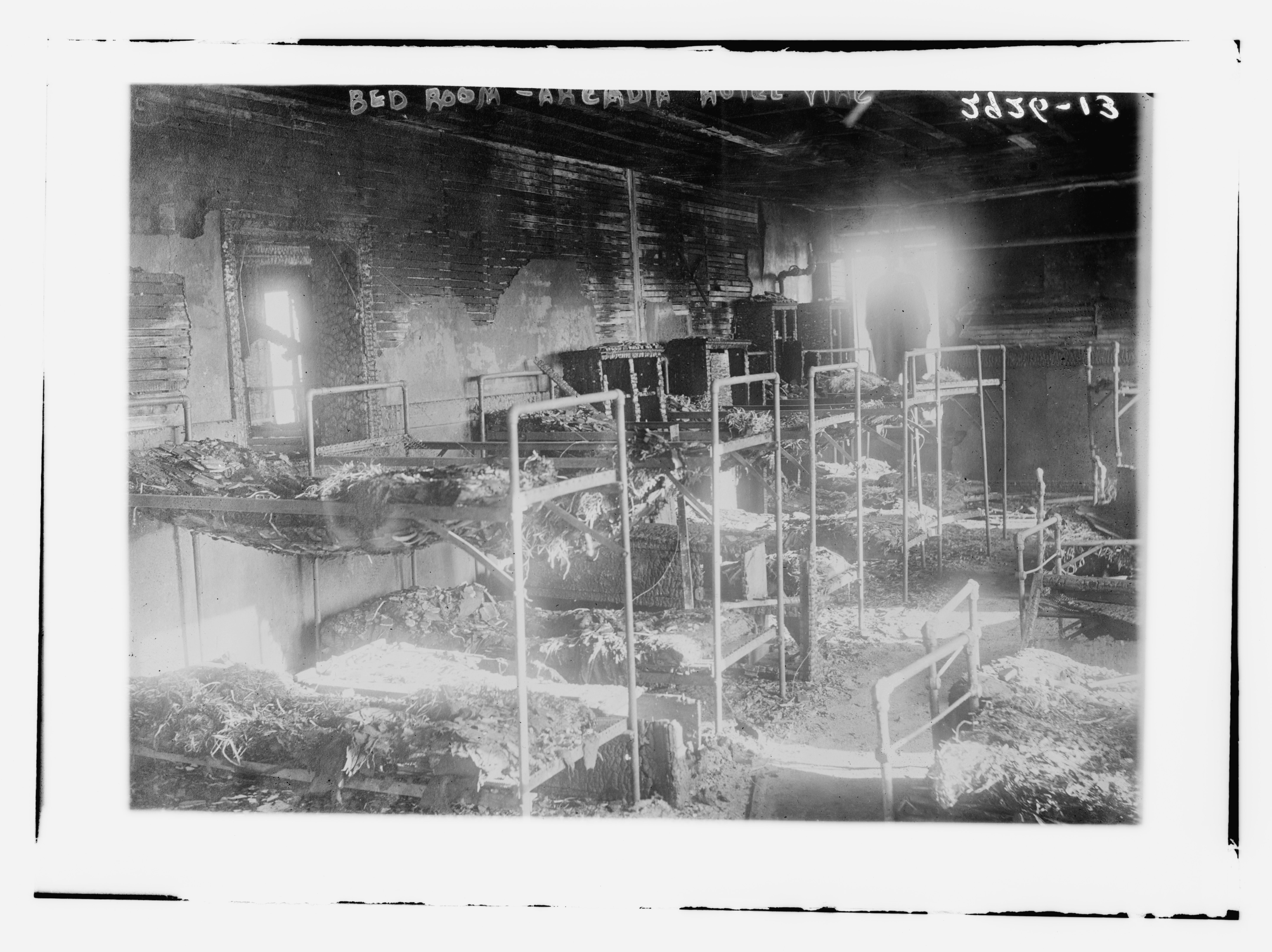
- Bedroom after the Arcadia Hotel fire
- Date: December 3, 1913
- Time: Around 2:00 a.m.
- Location: 1202-1206 Washington Street, Boston, Massachusetts, U.S.; 42°20′35″N 71°03′59″W
- Cause: Ignition of garbage in closet above boiler
- Deaths: 28
- Injuries: 50
- Charges: None

The Arcadia Hotel fire occurred on December 3, 1913, in a flophouse on the corner of Washington and Laconia Streets in Boston's South End. The fire killed 28 persons, making it the deadliest in Boston at that time, passing the Great Boston Fire of 1872.

== Background ==
The Arcadia Hotel was located at 1202–1206 Washington Street. It was a five-story brick building with a saloon occupying the first floor and the top four floors were used as a low-priced rooming house for men. The hotel was part of the Lyons chain of lodging houses. The building was owned by Moses H. Gulesian. The sleeping areas on the second and third floors were divided by walls of match-board sheathing that fell three feet (0.91 m) short of the ceiling. The fourth had sleeping areas similar to the lower two floors as well as bunk beds. The fifth floor was an open dormitory with bunk beds. According to the hotel register, 155 men were in the building that night.

== Fire ==
Just after 2 a.m. on December 3, 1913, a fire started in the hotel's main stairwell. The fire quickly spread up the open stairwell, spreading smoke and flames to almost every floor. The fire cut off the stairs before those staying in the hotel could be warned. At 2:05 a.m. a man passing by the main entrance discovered the fire and pulled a nearby fire alarm call box. He returned to the doorway, but found it impossible to enter. The Boston Fire Department raised ladders to every floor and carried down lodgers as quickly as possible, many of whom were naked or in underclothes. Fire personnel, police officers, and citizens also stretched life nets, which allowed a number of men to leave the building safely. Lodgers on the fifth floor were able to escape by leaping or using planks to reach the roofs of neighboring buildings. All of the people who were able to escape did so within ten minutes. The blaze killed 28 men and 50 others were rushed to Boston City Hospital, four of whom were seriously injured.

== Investigation ==
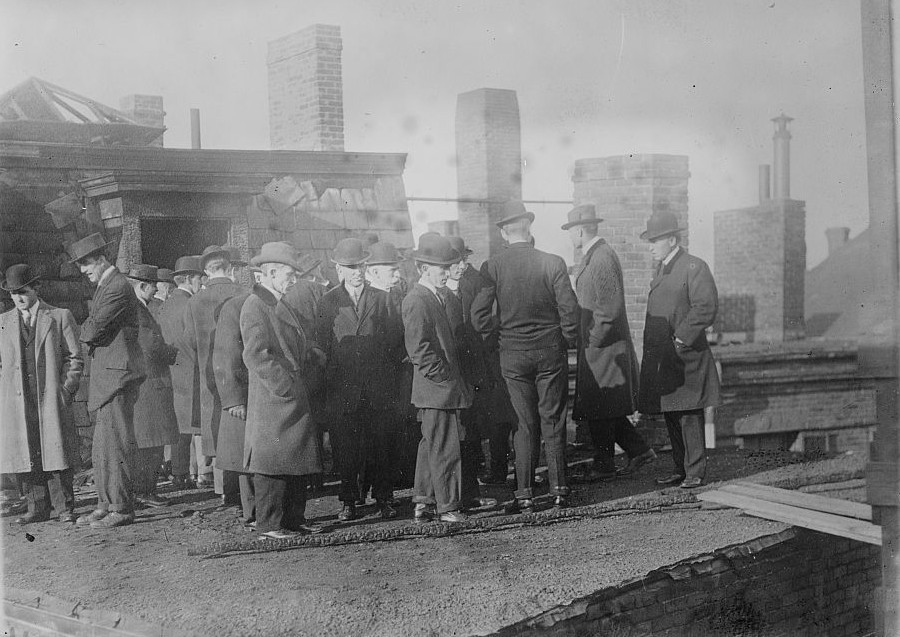
Grand jury at the hotel after the fire

There were eight investigations into the fire. A post-fire inspection of the building found that its heating plant was located in the cellar directly below the stairs and that there was no fire-proofing material between the dome of the boiler and the plastering over the laths of the stairway above it. Due to the extreme heat, the plaster had chipped away, exposing the laths. Investigators believed that the fire started in a garbage-filled closet directly above the boiler and below the first flight of stairs. Safety Engineering, which covered the fire in the December 1913 edition of the journal, cited the open stairway as the chief cause of death. If the stairway had been enclosed, the fire department would have been able to contain the fire to the first floor.

The owner of the building had been ordered on October 24, 1913, to provide additional fire escapes, however the building commissioner did not enforce the order and by the time of the fire they had not been provided. On the front wall of every floor, red lights illuminated the words "fire escape" and arrows pointing north and south. However these arrows did not lead to the building's fire escape, but rather to two windows - one facing Washington Street and the other facing Laconia Street. These arrows lured desperate lodgers into a trap and many leapt out of the windows, which killed two and seriously injured many others. The fire escape was located on the east-end of the building. On the second and third floors, rooms that allowed for fire escape access were kept locked by lodgers, which meant that they could only be accessed on these floors through the bathroom window.

Although state law required lodging houses to have fire extinguishers, the fact that none were used led investigators to believe that there were none in the hotel. The building also lacked a fire sprinkler system, which, according to Safety Engineering, "would have put out the fire with less water than a barrel will hold". The Boston American cited the lack of a fire extinguisher and sprinkler system "which are cheap and handy enough to have in any building" as a "real cause" of the 28 deaths. There was a manual fire alarm system in the Arcadia; however, it was not used on the night of the fire. According to Safety Engineering, if the building had an automatic fire alarm system, the fire would have been discovered almost immediately.

Lodging houses at this time were not required to have a fire alarm box in them. This caused precious time to be spent running to a street box.

A grand jury directed by Suffolk County District Attorney Joseph C. Pelletier investigated the fire, but could not find sufficient evidence for any criminal indictments.

== See also ==
- List of disasters in Massachusetts by death toll
