= Suffolk County, Massachusetts =

County in Massachusetts, United States

- County
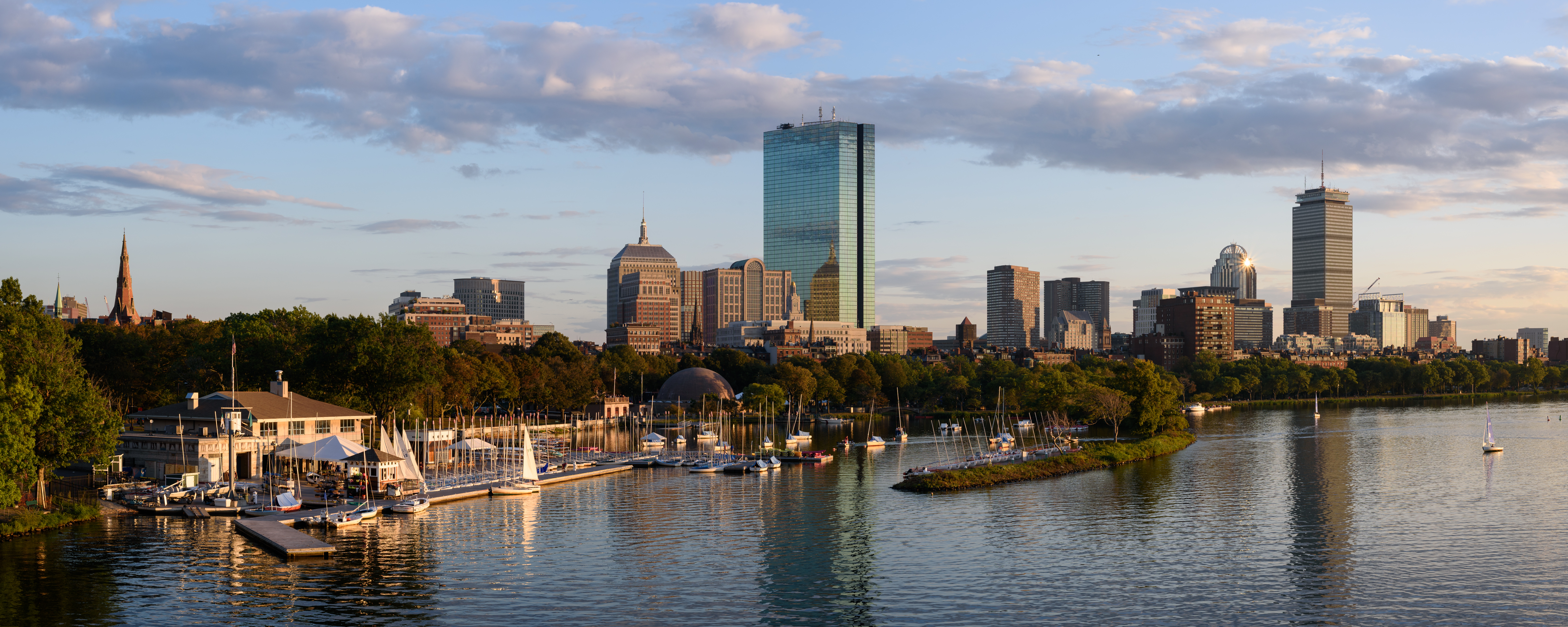
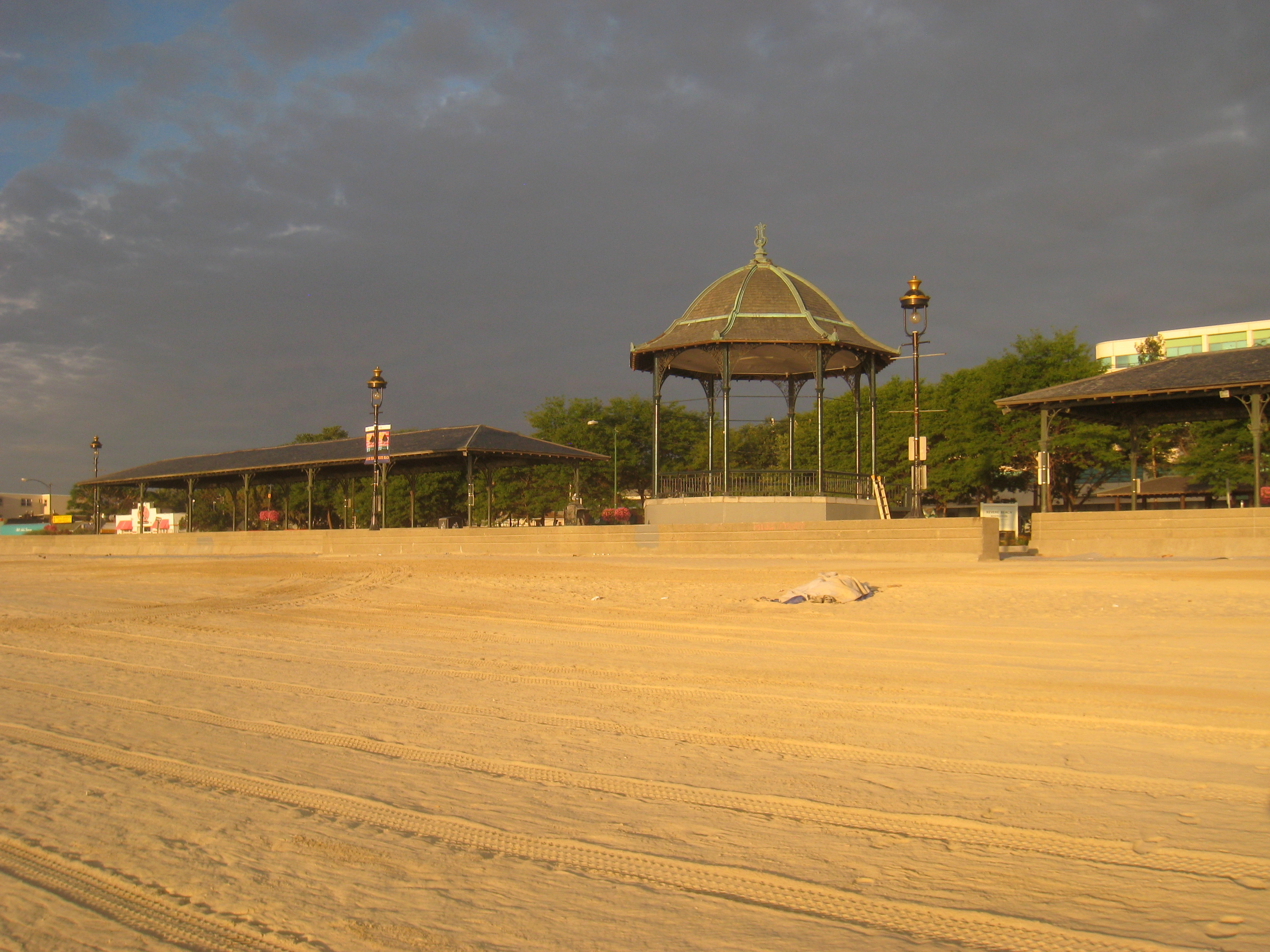
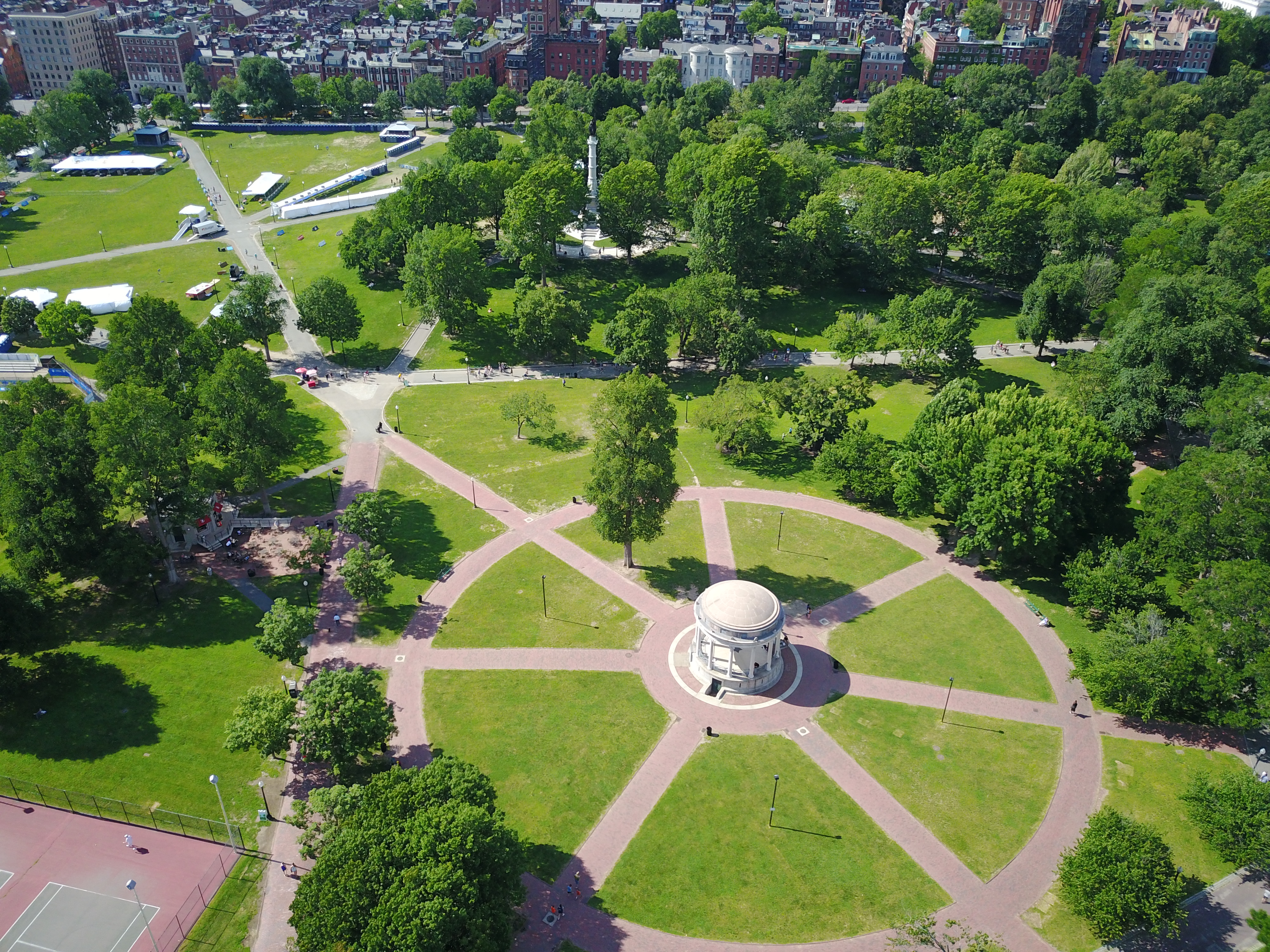
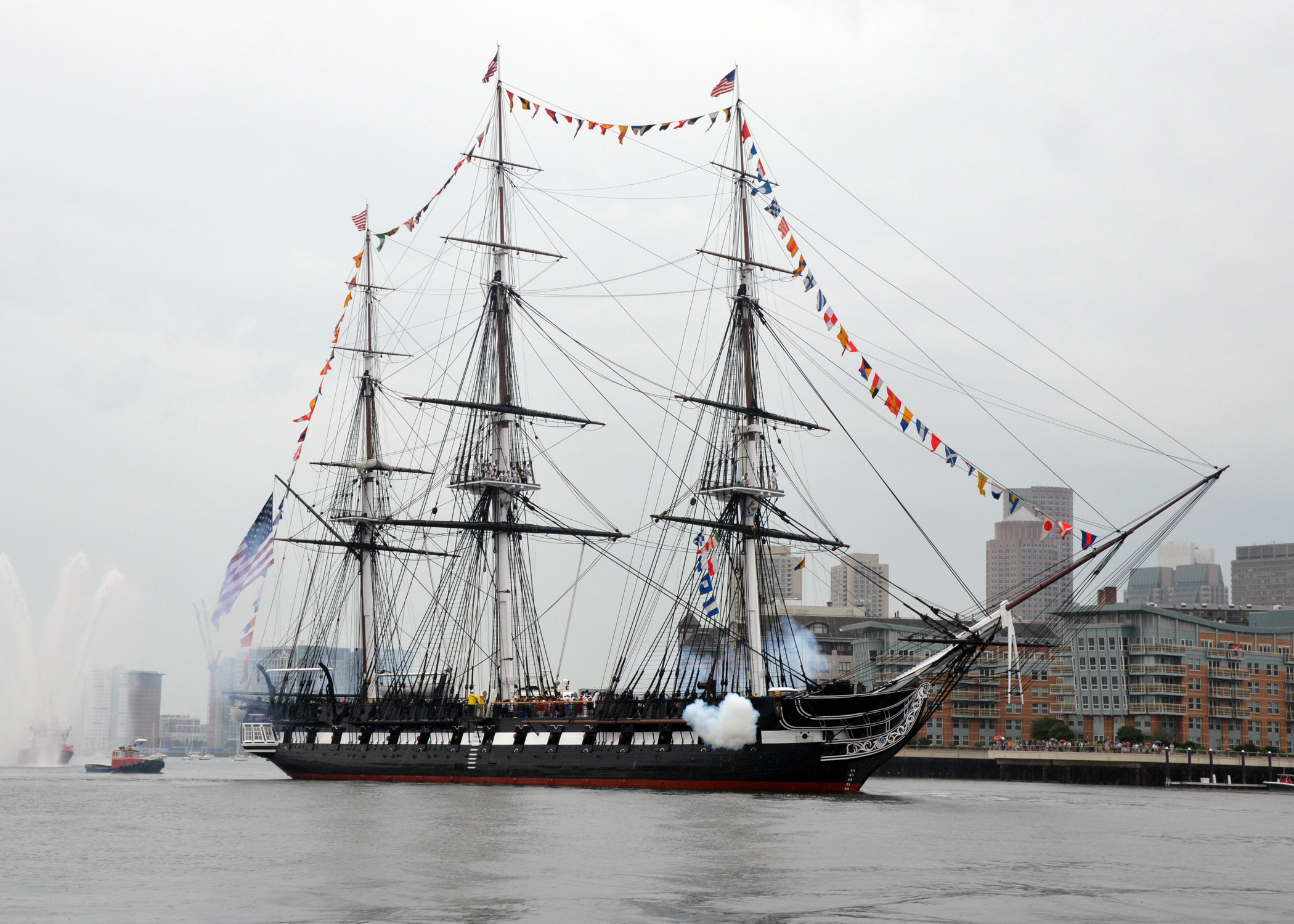
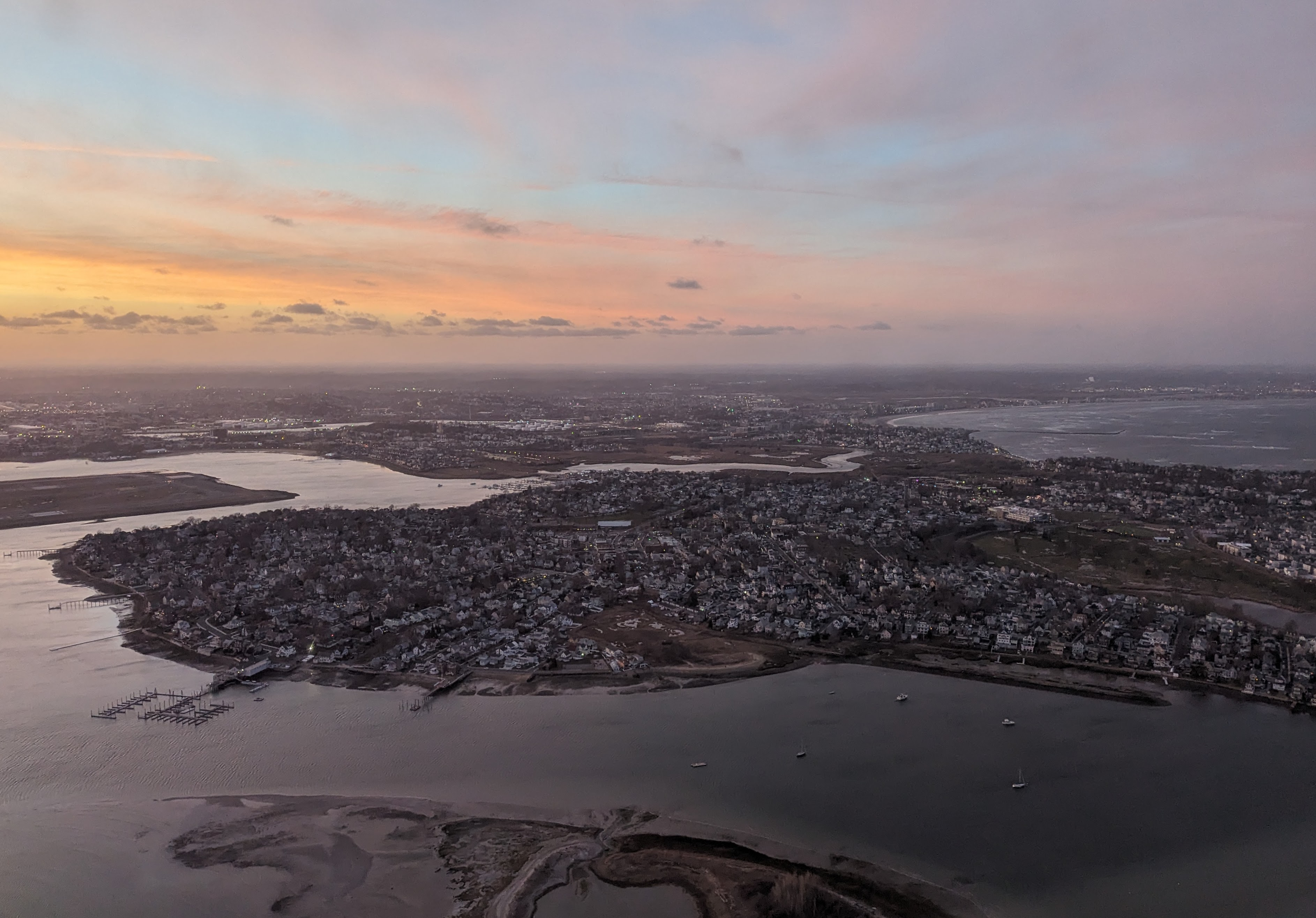
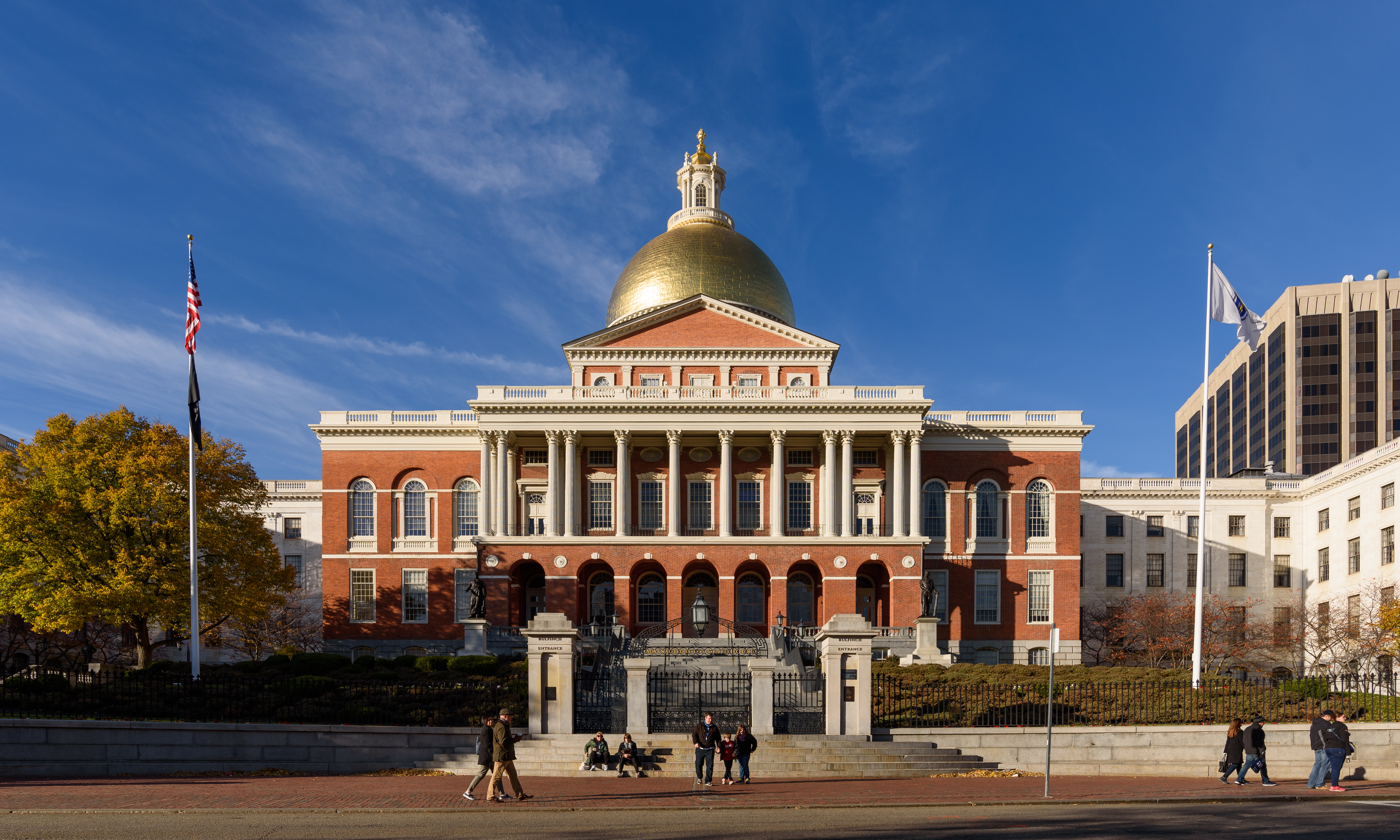
- Boston Revere Beach Boston Common USS Constitution Winthrop Massachusetts State House

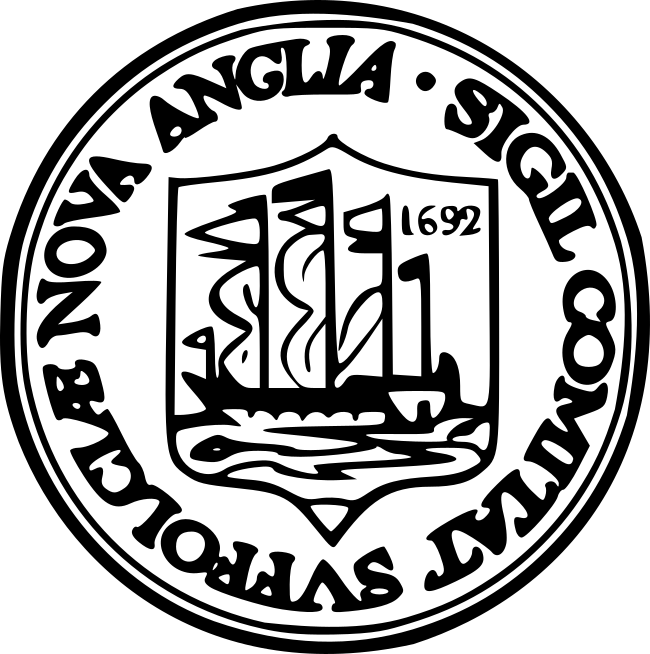
- Seal

- Location within the U.S. state of Massachusetts
- Coordinates: 42°20′06″N 71°04′25″W
- Country: United States
- State: Massachusetts
- Founded: May 10, 1643
- Named for: Suffolk, England
- Seat: Boston
- Largest city: Boston

Area
  - Total: 120 sq mi (310 km^{2})
  - Land: 58.15 sq mi (150.6 km^{2})
  - Water: 62 sq mi (160 km^{2}) 52%

Population (2020)
  - Total: 797,936
  - Estimate (2025): 791,891 ▼
  - Density: 13,698/sq mi (5,289/km^{2})

GDP
  - Total: $190.778 billion (2024)
- Time zone: UTC−5 (Eastern)
  - Summer (DST): UTC−4 (EDT)
- Congressional districts: 5th, 7th, 8th

Suffolk County (/ˈsʌfək/ SUF-ək) is located in the Commonwealth of Massachusetts, in the United States. As of the 2020 census, the population was 797,936, making it the fourth-most populous county in Massachusetts. The county comprises the cities of Boston, Chelsea, and Revere, and the town of Winthrop. The traditional county seat is Boston, the state capital and the largest city in Massachusetts. The county government was abolished in 1999, resulting in Suffolk County now functioning only as an administrative subdivision of state government and a set of communities grouped together for some statistical purposes. Suffolk County is located at the core of the Boston-Cambridge-Newton, MA-NH Metropolitan Statistical Area as well as the greater Boston-Worcester-Providence, MA-RI-NH-CT Combined Statistical Area.

== History ==
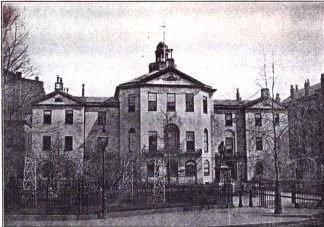
Old Suffolk County Courthouse 1810–1841

The county was created by the Massachusetts General Court on May 10, 1643, when it was ordered "that the whole plantation within this jurisdiction be divided into four shires". Suffolk initially contained Boston, Roxbury, Dorchester, Dedham, Braintree, Weymouth, Hingham and Hull. The county was named after Suffolk, England, which means "southern folk."

In 1731, the extreme western portions of Suffolk County, which included Mendon and Uxbridge, were split off to become part of Worcester County. In 1793, most of the original Suffolk County split off and became Norfolk County, leaving only Boston, Chelsea, Hingham, and Hull in Suffolk. Hingham and Hull would leave Suffolk County and join Plymouth County in 1803. Revere was set off from Chelsea and incorporated in 1846 and Winthrop was set off from Revere and incorporated in 1852. In the late 19th century and early 20th century, Boston annexed several adjacent cities and towns including Hyde Park, Roxbury, West Roxbury, and Dorchester from Norfolk County and Charlestown and Brighton from Middlesex County, resulting in an enlargement of Suffolk County.

During the early 20th century, County government functions were absorbed by the City of Boston, with Boston City Council becoming the de-facto County Commission, and the City Treasurer similarly becoming the County Treasurer, albeit said government was not formally abolished until 1999.

== Government and politics ==
Like an increasing number of Massachusetts counties, Suffolk County exists today only as a historical geographic region, and has no county government. All former county functions were assumed by state agencies in 1999. The sheriff, district attorney, and some other regional officials with specific duties are still elected locally to perform duties within the county region, but there is no county council, executives or commissioners. Prior to the abolition of county government, the authority of the Suffolk County Commission had for many years been exercised by the Boston City Council, even though three communities in the county are not part of the city. However, communities are now granted the right to form their own regional compacts for sharing services.

Politically speaking, Suffolk County supports the Democratic Party overwhelmingly. No Republican presidential candidate has won there since Calvin Coolidge in 1924. In 2012 Barack Obama received 77.4% of the vote, compared to 20.8% for former governor of Massachusetts Mitt Romney. In the 2014 gubernatorial election, Martha Coakley carried the county by a 32.4% margin, while losing the election statewide by 48.4 to 46.5%. In 2020, Joe Biden won the county by the largest margin of any presidential candidate since Lyndon B. Johnson in 1964, and was the first candidate since then to win more than 80% of the vote in the county.

Voter registration and party enrollment as of February 1, 2025
Party	Number of voters	Percentage
Unenrolled	276,417	57.00%
Democratic	183,302	37.75%
Republican	21,669	4.46%
Minor Parties	4,084	0.84%
Total	485,472	100%

United States presidential election results for Suffolk County, Massachusetts
Year	Republican		Democratic		Third party(ies)	
Year	No.	%	No.	%	No.	%
1856	8,582	44.97%	5,853	30.67%	4,648	24.36%
1860	10,974	48.84%	4,891	21.77%	6,604	29.39%
1868	17,381	57.31%	12,947	42.69%	0	0.00%
1872	17,766	61.40%	11,170	38.60%	0	0.00%
1876	22,832	47.49%	25,101	52.21%	141	0.29%
1880	28,346	49.21%	28,861	50.10%	396	0.69%
1884	23,283	36.85%	34,621	54.80%	5,278	8.35%
1888	31,191	44.15%	38,540	54.55%	921	1.30%
1892	35,304	43.38%	44,504	54.68%	1,584	1.95%
1896	53,633	59.89%	31,744	35.45%	4,174	4.66%
1900	40,951	44.82%	47,534	52.03%	2,880	3.15%
1904	43,681	44.14%	51,714	52.26%	3,569	3.61%
1908	46,337	48.50%	43,773	45.82%	5,429	5.68%
1912	24,179	24.71%	46,059	47.07%	27,613	28.22%
1916	42,492	40.03%	61,047	57.51%	2,609	2.46%
1920	108,089	58.08%	67,552	36.30%	10,457	5.62%
1924	104,658	47.14%	78,702	35.45%	38,633	17.40%
1928	99,392	32.47%	204,603	66.84%	2,135	0.70%
1932	88,737	29.97%	198,792	67.14%	8,543	2.89%
1936	96,418	27.55%	223,732	63.92%	29,860	8.53%
1940	138,575	36.07%	243,233	63.32%	2,337	0.61%
1944	139,285	37.19%	234,475	62.61%	727	0.19%
1948	105,671	27.44%	265,611	68.98%	13,785	3.58%
1952	162,147	40.05%	240,957	59.51%	1,775	0.44%
1956	162,836	45.78%	191,245	53.77%	1,605	0.45%
1960	85,750	25.25%	252,823	74.44%	1,044	0.31%
1964	40,251	13.50%	257,161	86.22%	842	0.28%
1968	48,952	18.20%	203,406	75.62%	16,619	6.18%
1972	85,272	33.73%	166,250	65.76%	1,299	0.51%
1976	80,623	34.70%	142,010	61.11%	9,739	4.19%
1980	73,271	33.89%	113,416	52.46%	29,520	13.65%
1984	91,563	37.37%	152,568	62.27%	866	0.35%
1988	77,137	34.37%	143,677	64.02%	3,596	1.60%
1992	51,378	23.43%	132,921	60.62%	34,974	15.95%
1996	39,753	19.94%	145,586	73.01%	14,053	7.05%
2000	44,441	20.48%	154,888	71.38%	17,671	8.14%
2004	54,923	22.82%	182,592	75.88%	3,130	1.30%
2008	57,194	21.24%	207,128	76.94%	4,900	1.82%
2012	59,999	20.75%	223,896	77.45%	5,203	1.80%
2016	50,421	16.09%	245,751	78.44%	17,111	5.46%
2020	58,613	17.47%	270,522	80.64%	6,327	1.89%
2024	66,480	22.22%	222,280	74.29%	10,433	3.49%

=== Sheriff's department ===
The Suffolk County Sheriff's Department's primary responsibility is oversight of the Nashua Street Jail and the South Bay House of Correction. These were built in the 1990s to replace the historic Charles Street Jail and Deer Island Prison, respectively. The Suffolk County Sheriff's Department was among those named in a 2020 WBUR report about the neglect of inmates with medical conditions in Massachusetts prisons leading to their deaths.

Several notable figures in Massachusetts history were once the sheriff of Suffolk County:

- Joseph Hall (1818–1825)
- Charles Pinckney Sumner (1825–1839)
- John M. Clark (1855–1883)
- John A. Keliher (1917–1938)
- John F. Dowd (1938–1939)
- Frederick R. Sullivan (1939–1968)
- John W. Sears (1968–1969)
- Thomas S. Eisenstadt (1969–1977)
- Dennis J. Kearney (1977–1987)
- Robert Rufo (1987–1996)
- Andrea Cabral (2002–2013)
- Steven W. Tompkins (2013–present)

=== District Attorneys ===
District attorneys of Suffolk County
District attorney	Term
James T. Austin	1812–1832
Samuel D. Parker	1832–1852
John C. Park	1852–1853
George P. Sanger	1853–1854
George W. Cooley	1854–1861
George P. Sanger	1861–1869
John Wilder May	1869–1875
Oliver Stevens	1875–1905
Michael J. Sughrue	1905
John B. Moran	1905–1909
Arthur D. Hill	1909
Joseph C. Pelletier	1909–1922
Thomas C. O'Brien	1922–1927
William J. Foley	1927–1952
Garrett H. Byrne	1952–1979
Newman A. Flanagan	1979–1992
Ralph C. Martin II	1992–2002
Daniel F. Conley	2002–2018
John Pappas	2018–2019
Rachael Rollins	2019–2022
Kevin Hayden	2022–present

== Geography ==
According to the U.S. Census Bureau, the county has a total area of 120 square miles (310 km^{2}), of which 58 square miles (150 km^{2}) is land and 62 square miles (160 km^{2}) (52%) is water. It is the second-smallest county in Massachusetts by land area and smallest by total area.

=== Adjacent counties ===
- Essex County (north)
- Norfolk County (south)
- Middlesex County (west)

Suffolk County has no land border with Plymouth County to its southeast, but the two counties share a water boundary in the middle of Massachusetts Bay.

=== National protected areas ===
- Boston African American National Historic Site
- Boston Harbor Islands National Recreation Area (part)
- Boston National Historical Park

=== Major highways ===
- I-90 / Mass Pike
- I-93
- US 1
- US 20
- Route 1A
- Route 2
  - Route 2A
- Route 3
  - Route 3A
- Route 9
- Route 16
- Route 28
- Route 30
- Route 60
- Route 99
- Route 107
- Route 109
- Route 145
- Route 203

== Demographics ==
Historical population
Census	Pop.	Note	%±
1790	44,865		—
1800	28,015		−37.6%
1810	34,381		22.7%
1820	43,940		27.8%
1830	62,163		41.5%
1840	95,773		54.1%
1850	144,517		50.9%
1860	192,700		33.3%
1870	270,802		40.5%
1880	387,927		43.3%
1890	484,780		25.0%
1900	611,417		26.1%
1910	731,388		19.6%
1920	835,522		14.2%
1930	879,536		5.3%
1940	863,248		−1.9%
1950	896,615		3.9%
1960	791,329		−11.7%
1970	735,190		−7.1%
1980	650,142		−11.6%
1990	663,906		2.1%
2000	689,807		3.9%
2010	722,023		4.7%
2020	797,936		10.5%
2025 (est.)	791,891	▼	−0.8%
U.S. Decennial Census; 1790-1960 1900-1990; 1990-2000 2010-2020

=== 2020 census ===
As of the 2020 census, the county had a population of 797,936. Of the residents, 16.0% were under the age of 18 and 12.6% were 65 years of age or older; the median age was 32.3 years. For every 100 females there were 90.8 males, and for every 100 females age 18 and over there were 88.5 males. 100.0% of residents lived in urban areas and 0.0% lived in rural areas.

The racial makeup of the county was 47.1% White, 18.2% Black or African American, 0.5% American Indian and Alaska Native, 10.2% Asian, 0.1% Native Hawaiian and Pacific Islander, 12.8% from some other race, and 11.1% from two or more races. Hispanic or Latino residents of any race comprised 22.4% of the population.

There were 324,655 households in the county, of which 22.5% had children under the age of 18 living with them and 38.7% had a female householder with no spouse or partner present. About 35.0% of all households were made up of individuals and 10.5% had someone living alone who was 65 years of age or older. There were 349,616 housing units, of which 7.1% were vacant. Among occupied housing units, 33.2% were owner-occupied and 66.8% were renter-occupied. The homeowner vacancy rate was 1.0% and the rental vacancy rate was 4.9%.

=== Racial and ethnic composition ===
Suffolk County, Massachusetts – Racial and ethnic composition Note: the US Census treats Hispanic/Latino as an ethnic category. This table excludes Latinos from the racial categories and assigns them to a separate category. Hispanics/Latinos may be of any race.
Race / Ethnicity (NH = Non-Hispanic)	Pop 1980	Pop 1990	Pop 2000	Pop 2010	Pop 2020	% 1980	% 1990	% 2000	% 2010	% 2020
White alone (NH)	463,985	412,210	359,535	346,979	352,900	71.37%	62.09%	52.12%	48.06%	44.23%
Black or African American alone (NH)	122,913	138,695	143,817	142,980	135,255	18.91%	20.89%	20.85%	19.80%	16.95%
Native American or Alaska Native alone (NH)	1,383	1,682	1,710	1,367	1,147	0.21%	0.25%	0.25%	0.19%	0.14%
Asian alone (NH)	15,501	32,665	47,970	58,963	80,607	2.38%	4.92%	6.95%	8.17%	10.10%
Native Hawaiian or Pacific Islander alone (NH)	x	x	314	196	281	x	x	0.05%	0.03%	0.04%
Other race alone (NH)	6,299	5,810	8,780	11,426	11,702	0.97%	0.88%	1.27%	1.58%	1.47%
Mixed race or Multiracial (NH)	x	x	20,650	16,657	37,517	x	x	2.99%	2.31%	4.70%
Hispanic or Latino (any race)	40,061	72,844	107,031	143,455	178,527	6.16%	10.97%	15.52%	19.87%	22.37%
Total	650,142	663,906	689,807	722,023	797,936	100.00%	100.00%	100.00%	100.00%	100.00%

=== American Community Survey 2025 data ===
The United States Census Bureau estimated that in 2025, Suffolk County’s population was 788.102. It was also estimated that the county's population was 45,13% Non-Hispanic White, 22,69% Hispanic or Latino, 17,79% Non-Hispanic Black, 11,17% Asian, 0,19% Native American, 0,05% Pacific Islander, and 2,98% Multiracial.

Total	Population	Percentage
Non-Hispanic White	355.679	45,13%
Hispanic or Latino	178.802	22,69%
Non-Hispanic Black	140.245	17,79%
Asian	88.026	11,17%
Native American	1.482	0,19%
Pacific Islander	395	0,05%
Non-Hispanic Multiracial	23.473	2,98%

=== 2010 census ===
As of the 2010 census, of the 292,767 households, 24.4% had children under the age of 18 living with them, 27.1% were married couples living together, 16.3% had a female householder with no husband present, 52.0% were non-families, and 36.3% of all households were made up of individuals. The average household size was 2.30 and the average family size was 3.11. The median age was 31.5 years.

The median income for a household in the county was $50,597 and the median income for a family was $58,127. Males had a median income of $48,887 versus $43,658 for females. The per capita income for the county was $30,720. About 15.7% of families and 20.6% of the population were below the poverty line, including 28.1% of those under age 18 and 19.1% of those age 65 or over.

Suffolk County Racial Breakdown of Population (2017)
Race	Percentage of Suffolk County population	Percentage of Massachusetts population	Percentage of United States population	County-to-State Difference	County-to-USA Difference
White	61.7%	81.3%	76.6%	–19.6%	–14.9%
White (Non-Hispanic)	45.4%	72.1%	60.7%	–26.7%	–15.3%
Black	24.9%	8.8%	13.4%	+16.1%	+11.5%
Hispanic	22.9%	11.9%	18.1%	+11.0%	+4.8%
Asian	9.1%	6.9%	5.8%	+2.2%	+3.3%
Native Americans/Hawaiians	0.9%	0.6%	1.5%	+0.3%	–0.6%
Two or more races	3.4%	2.4%	2.7%	+1.0%	+0.7%

=== Ancestry ===
According to the 2012-2016 American Community Survey 5-Year Estimates, the largest ancestry groups in Suffolk County, Massachusetts are:

Ancestry	Percentage of Suffolk County population	Percentage of Massachusetts population	Percentage of United States population	County-to-State Difference	County-to-USA Difference
Irish	13.73%	21.16%	10.39%	–7.42%	+3.35%
Italian	9.50%	13.19%	5.39%	–3.69%	+7.80%
West Indian	6.05%	1.96%	0.90%	+4.09%	+1.05%
Puerto Rican	5.32%	4.52%	1.66%	+0.80%	+3.66%
English	4.32%	9.77%	7.67%	–5.45%	–3.35%
German	4.21%	6.00%	14.40%	–1.79%	–10.19%
Chinese	4.02%	2.28%	1.24%	+1.74%	+2.78%
American	3.96%	4.26%	6.89%	–0.30%	–2.93%
Sub-Saharan African	3.78%	2.00%	1.01%	+1.78%	+2.76%
Haitian	3.13%	1.15%	0.31%	+1.98%	+2.82%
Polish	2.41%	4.67%	2.93%	–2.26%	–0.53%
French	2.01%	6.82%	2.56%	–4.81%	–0.55%
Cape Verdean	1.99%	0.97%	0.03%	+1.02%	+1.96%
Vietnamese	1.61%	0.69%	0.54%	+0.92%	+1.07%
Russian	1.56%	1.65%	0.88%	–0.08%	+0.69%
Arab	1.54%	1.10%	0.59%	+0.44%	+0.95%
Jamaican	1.47%	0.44%	0.34%	+1.03%	+1.12%
Scottish	1.27%	2.28%	1.71%	–1.02%	–0.45%
Asian Indian	1.22%	1.39%	1.09%	–0.17%	+0.13%
Mexican	1.18%	0.67%	11.96%	+0.51%	–10.78%
French Canadian	1.19%	3.91%	0.65%	–2.72%	+0.53%

=== Demographic breakdown by town ===
==== Income ====
Data is from the 2007-2011 American Community Survey 5-Year Estimates.

Rank	Town		Area (land)	Per capita income	Median household income	Median family income	Population	Number of households
1	Winthrop	City	2.0 mi^{2} (5.2 km^{2})	$36,624	$61,744	$81,647	17,430	7,356
	Massachusetts	State		$35,051	$65,981	$83,371	6,512,227	2,522,409
2	Boston	City	48.42 mi^{2} (125.4 km^{2})	$33,158	$51,739	$61,035	609,942	247,621
	Suffolk County	County		$32,034	$51,638	$60,342	713,089	286,437
	United States	Country		$27,915	$52,762	$64,293	306,603,772	114,761,359
3	Revere	City	5.9 mi^{2} (15 km^{2})	$25,085	$50,592	$58,345	50,845	19,425
4	Chelsea	City	2.2 mi^{2} (5.7 km^{2})	$20,214	$43,155	$46,967	34,872	12,035

== Communities ==
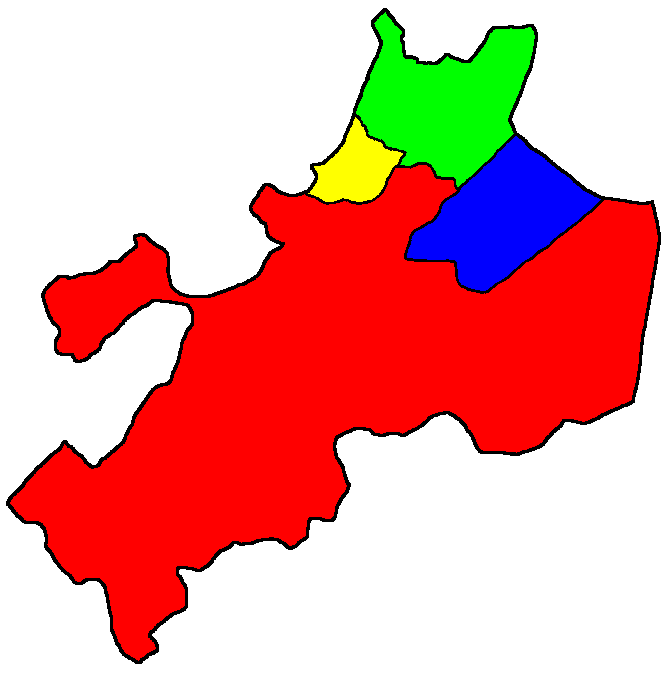
Map of Suffolk County showing (clockwise from bottom) Boston (red), Chelsea (yellow), Revere (green), and Winthrop (blue). Interior water features such as Boston Harbor are filled in by the color of the containing city.

- Boston (traditional county seat)
- Chelsea
- Revere
- Winthrop

== Education ==
Each city has its own school district (including Boston Public Schools, Chelsea Public Schools, Revere Public Schools, and Winthrop Public Schools), which all follow municipal boundaries.

Tertiary institutions in the county include:

- Benjamin Franklin Institute of Technology
- Berklee College of Music
- Boston Architectural College
- Boston College (eastern side)
- Boston University
- Bunker Hill Community College
  - Includes a Chelsea Campus
- Cambridge College
- Emerson College
- Emmanuel College
- Fisher College
- Harvard University, including Harvard Business School and Harvard Medical School
- Massachusetts College of Art and Design
- Massachusetts College of Pharmacy and Health Sciences
- MGH Institute of Health Professions
- New England College of Optometry
- New England Conservatory
- New England Law Boston
- North Bennet Street School
- Northeastern University
- Roxbury Community College
- Saint John's Seminary
- Sattler College
- School of the Museum of Fine Arts at Tufts University
- Simmons University
- Suffolk University
- Tufts University School of Medicine
- University of Massachusetts Boston
- Urban College of Boston
- Wentworth Institute of Technology

Public library systems in the county include:

- Boston Public Library
- Chelsea Public Library
- Revere Public Library
- Winthrop Public Library and Museum

== See also ==
- List of Massachusetts locations by per capita income
- Registry of Deeds (Massachusetts)
- USS Suffolk County (LST-1173)
- National Register of Historic Places listings in Suffolk County, Massachusetts
