= List of killings by law enforcement officers in the United States, December 2025 =

A still from dashcam video, depicting the aftermath of the fatal shooting of 29-year-old Christian Nelson in Seattle, Washington

This is a list of people reported killed by non-military law enforcement officers in the United States in December 2025, whether in the line of duty or not, and regardless of reason or method. The listing documents the occurrence of a death, making no implications regarding wrongdoing or justification on the part of the person killed or officer involved. Killings are arranged by date of the incident that caused death. Different death dates, if known, are noted in the description. The table below lists 100 people.

== December 2025 ==
| Date | Name (age) of deceased | Race | Location | Description |
|---|---|---|---|---|
| 2025-12-31 | Lamar Harper (31) | Black | Los Angeles, California | LAPD responded to an assault with a deadly weapon and encountered Harper on Metro Rail. He resisted but was forcibly taken into custody by police. He was medically cleared before being booked but was later found unresponsive in jail. He was pronounced dead on Jan 5, 2026. The footage had been released. |
| 2025-12-31 | Keith Porter Jr. (43) | Black | Los Angeles, California | In the Northridge neighborhood, police were called to reports of a man firing shots in the air with a rifle. An off-duty ICE agent heard the shots fired and confronted the man. The agent shot the man after he allegedly fired at the agent. |
| 2025-12-31 | Lawrence Gonzalez (39) | Hispanic | Los Angeles, California | LAPD responded to a domestic violence and restraining order violation at an apartment in San Pedro. When officers tried to detain the suspect, a physical altercation ensued during which an officer opened fire, killing the suspect. The suspect tried to disarm an officer when the officer shot him.The footage was released. |
| 2025-12-31 | Hugo Fernandez De Lara | Hispanic | Fontana, California | Fontana Police officers attempted to a detain a man wanted in connection with the sale and trafficking of narcotics, primarily fentanyl. During the encounter, the suspect rammed multiple vehicles with his vehicle. The officers subsequently shot him. No body camera footage of the incident has been shared with the public. |
| 2025-12-31 | Joshua Duane Butler (40) | White | Wetumka, Oklahoma | While OHP troopers were searching an inmate who escaped from the Okfuskee County Jail, they spotted a vehicle of interest. The suspect then reportedly fled on foot with a rifle and ran into a pasture. State Police shot and killed him for reasons unknown. No body camera footage of the incident has been shared with the public. |
| 2025-12-30 | unidentified male (30) | Unknown | Eaton Rapids, Michigan | An attempt traffic stop turned into a pursuit that ended with a crash before fleeing on foot. The man refused to obey numerous commands from the officer and informed the officer that he had a gun. During the encounter, the man was fatally shot. The officer was placed on administrative leave afterward. No body camera footage of the incident has been shared with the public. |
| 2025-12-30 | Brent Elvin Ivy (39) | Black | Dunwoody, Georgia | Gwinnett County officers attempted to pull over a driver in an SUV that was wanted out of Roswell, Georgia. Ivy, a Dacula resident with a lengthy criminal history, rammed the SUV into an officer's car, and attempted to flee. Ivy jumped over the median and led into a brief chase. Despite a taser malfunction, the man fell to the ground but attempted to grab a gun and point it at officers. The man was then fatally shot by two officers. No body camera footage of the incident has been shared with the public. |
| 2025-12-30 | Alex Adalid Melgar-Matheu (17) | Hispanic | Slaton, Texas | In a domestic incident, Melgar-Matheu and another man entered a home and attacked the two residents, with Melgar-Matheu holding a woman down with a knife and the other man allegedly attacking her daughter. The daughter used Siri to call police. The specific circumstances of the shooting were not released, but police killed Melgar-Matheu and arrested the other man. No body camera footage of the incident has been shared with the public. |
| 2025-12-29 | Leana Estrada (34) | Hispanic | Tucson, Arizona | Police responded to a report about gunfire and a woman yelling. When the found the woman outside, she reportedly pointed the gun at officers when officers shot her. The footage was released by police in April, 2026. |
| 2025-12-29 | LJ Causey Jr. (32) | White | Puyallup, Washington | Pierce County deputies responded to a suspicious vehicle following shots fired reports. Police tried to arrest Causey, who was sleeping inside the vehicle for felony harassment due to the earlier incident. Under unclear circumstances, deputies shot Causey. Causey's girlfriend said he and a friend had gotten into a gunfight with neighbors after confronting them for speeding down the street. No body camera footage of the incident has been shared with the public. |
| 2025-12-29 | Jacob Wesley Adkins (25) | White | Keswick, Virginia | Pittsylvania County Police issued a BOLO on a Ford Fusion, which was involved in a chase with them earlier the day. A state trooper later located the vehicle which led to another pursuit. After a successful PIT maneuver to stop the vehicle, the driver, Adkins, of Hurt, Virginia (with Lynchburg ties), shot the trooper before he was fatally shot. No body camera footage of the incident has been shared with the public. |
| 2025-12-29 | Alan Michael Rush (46) | White | Jacksonville, Florida | When task force officers were attempting to arrest a wanted suspect who entered a vehicle, a physical altercation occurred between a JSO officer and the suspect's driver, Rush. Rush pulled out a gun during the fight, leading the officer to shoot him in the head, killing him on-scene.Police released the footage. |
| 2025-12-28 | Paul Dominguez (50) | Hispanic | El Paso, Texas | El Paso Police responded to a disturbance regarding a drunk man. When they attempted to arrest the man, the man reportedly resisted before they utilized force to arrest him. The man would later became unresponsive and died. No body camera footage of the incident has been shared with the public. |
| 2025-12-28 | Georgeann Alexandra Goodman (34) | White | Safford, Arizona | A woman called police to report that her granddaughter, Goodman, was threatening self-harm and had threatened to engage in a shoot-out. After deputies located her, Goodman stated she wanted to be shot and was reported to be holding a gun. Following a stand-off, police shot and killed her. No body camera footage of the incident has been shared with the public. |
| 2025-12-27 | Mariah Cardona (44) | Hispanic | Atlanta, Georgia | APD officer Kevin Stroner killed his wife before committing suicide. Their bodies were found on December 27. Medical examiner ruled it as an isolated murder-suicide incident. |
| 2025-12-27 | Perry J. Sellars (44) | White | Vancouver, Washington | Police responded to a report that a man had fired a gun at a woman outside a home. Two officers shot and killed the man when he approached the 911 caller with a firearm. The shooting occurred in the midnight between December 27 and December 28.The footage was released. |
| 2025-12-26 | Israel Mendoza (45) | Hispanic | Brownsville, Texas | BPD officers responded to a domestic dispute where an intoxicated and aggressive man was causing disturbance. Upon arrival, officers approached Mendoza, who was holding a weapon made out of electrical thick wire with a metal blunt object standing in the middle of the street. They subsequently tased him after he refused to drop the weapon and utilized force to arrest him. He later died at a hospital. No body camera footage of the incident has been shared with the public. |
| 2025-12-26 | Jerry Scott Gee (56) | Unknown | Lake Worth, Texas | Police pursued a man who had a warrant for solicitation of prostitution. After the man's vehicle became disabled, police shot him when he exited and allegedly took a shooting stance while holding an unspecified object. No body camera footage of the incident has been shared with the public. |
| 2025-12-26 | Andres Arizmendi (43) | Hispanic | Harlingen, Texas | A wanted felon was spotted in Combes before leading to a police chase that ended in Harlingen. The man, from La Feria, exited the vehicle and fired at law enforcement officers when he was struck by returned fire. No body camera footage of the incident has been shared with the public. |
| 2025-12-26 | John Drake (77) | White | Wallace, Idaho | A gunman shot two women on the street before entering a Shoshone County sheriff's office and firing into the dispatch center. An officer was shot before other officers returned fire, fatally striking the gunman. No body camera footage of the incident has been shared with the public. |
| 2025-12-26 | Tjamel Ali Hamlin II (36) | Black | Mint Hill, North Carolina | Two officers responded to a report of a child custody exchange at an Edible Arrangements store when a man pulled out a gun and shot two officers. Another officer shot the suspect, who was pronounced dead on-scene. No body camera footage of the incident has been shared with the public. |
| 2025-12-26 | Thaddeus Turner (50s) | Black | Houston, Texas | A woman called the police regarding that a man pointed a gun at her after she thought she was involved in an accident in a parking lot of an apartment complex near Holloway Heights. When Houston Police located the man's vehicle, the man reportedly didn't follow commands. At some point, the man pulled a gun on them before officers opened fire.Police released the footage. |
| 2025-12-25 | Marc Lucas (31) | White | Columbia, Missouri | Lucas allegedly set fire to a couch in a hotel and threatened workers at another hotel with a pocket knife before Columbia officers arrived. When they arrived, Lucas tried to attack an individual before trying to assault an officer with the knife when they intervened. Two officers shot him. He died on May 11, 2026. The prosecutor ruled the shooting justified. No body camera footage of the incident has been shared with the public. |
| 2025-12-25 | Jordan Bossette (33) | Black | Beaumont, Texas | After police responded to a disturbance call at a home on Christmas evening in South Beaumont, one officer arrived before two men pulled out handguns and pointed at the officer. Shots were fired upon the arrival which left a male suspect deceased on the street. Another male suspect ran back in the house, but later surrendered after a standoff. No body camera footage of the incident has been shared with the public. |
| 2025-12-24 | Orlando T. Harding (38) | Black | Lynchburg, Virginia | Lynchburg officers responded to an assault report and deployed a taser to subdue the suspect in the struggle. The suspect later experienced a fatal cardiac arrest. No body camera footage of the incident has been shared with the public. |
| 2025-12-24 | Romaine Morgan (43) | Black | Brentwood, California | Police pulled over a Stockton man for suspected drunk driving and found a rifle in the car. When officers moved to arrest him, the man resisted, reentered his car and grabbed the gun, leading police to shoot.The footage was released. |
| 2025-12-23 | unidentified | Unknown | Marietta, Georgia | An off-duty DeKalb County officer hit and killed a pedestrian who entered the right lane in the Interstate 75 with his vehicle. No confirmed reason why the pedestrian was walking along the interstate. No body camera footage of the incident has been shared with the public. |
| 2025-12-23 | Ginger Phillips (57) | White | Knoxville, Tennessee | Police were dispatched to a gas station where an armed suicidal woman threatened to harm herself inside a car. Despite negotiation efforts, the situation escalated which resulted in two KCSO deputies shooting the woman. No body camera footage of the incident has been shared with the public. |
| 2025-12-23 | Rahman Rose (44) | Black | Minquadale, Delaware | A gunman from Wilmington opened fire at a DMV office, killing State trooper Matthew T. "Ty" Snook, before being killed by New Castle police. No body camera footage of the incident has been shared with the public. |
| 2025-12-22 | Eduardo Trejo De Arcos (26) | Hispanic | Idaho Falls, Idaho | Police were called to a disturbance involving a knife. When they attempted to arrest the man, the man lunged at them with a knife, leading to a struggle. An officer opened fire, killing him.Police released the footage. |
| 2025-12-22 | Jackson Jacobs (35) | Unknown | Alpena Township, Michigan | During a traffic stop, a man cut an Alpena officer with a knife before the officer discharged his gun, killing him. No body camera footage of the incident has been shared with the public. |
| 2025-12-21 | Luis Arreola-Palma (32) | Hispanic | Albuquerque, New Mexico | Police attempted to arrest Arreola-Palma for warrants. Officers wrestled with Arreola-Palma, during which he fired a shot that hit an officer's radio. A second officer shot and killed him.The footage was released. |
| 2025-12-21 | unidentified male (18) | Unknown | Knoxville, Tennessee | A collision involving three parties including a Knoxville police officer killed one and critically injured another. No body camera footage of the incident has been shared with the public. |
| 2025-12-21 | Gary Gates (51) | White | Imperial Beach, California | San Diego County deputies were working an event when an armed man, Gates, asked to speak with them. He made statements indicating "suicide by cop" and produced a knife while approaching them. A deputy shot Gates after repeated commands, with Gates saying "I forgive you" before his death.The footage was released. |
| 2025-12-21 | Jose Arley Fernandez-Solano (38) | Hispanic | San Antonio, Texas | In a domestic incident, a woman called police to report that a man was attempting to force his way into her home with her and her children inside. Bexar County deputies spoke to the man, who produced a gun and shot two of them. The deputies returned fire, killing him.The footage was released. First officer's "body worn camera was dislodged during struggle." First officer entered the residence as soon as the door was opened, and threw the suspect to the ground, attacking him. Second officers camera footage shows him shooting the suspect while the suspect is underneath of the first officer. |
| 2025-12-21 | Chez Fray (29) | Black | New York City, New York | NYPD officers were called to a home by Fray's parents in Far Rockaway, Queens, who said he was armed with a box cutter. Police said Fray's father got into an altercation with him, though the father said he was hugging his son. After the father retreated, officers killed Fray when he charged at police with the box cutter in hand.New York State Attorney General released the footage. |
| 2025-12-20 | unidentified male (60) | Unknown | Pacific, Missouri | Police responded to a report of a suicidal person who was also intoxicated. A 911 caller reported that he heard a gunshot in the basement of the home. Officers located the man outside his home and shot him. No body camera footage of the incident has been shared with the public. |
| 2025-12-20 | Dennis Girard (38) | White | Springfield, Massachusetts | SPD officers responded to reports of a man exhibiting erratic behavior while carrying a knife. An officer shot and killed the man. No body camera footage of the incident has been shared with the public. |
| 2025-12-20 | Gerald Frank Martin (32) | Unknown | Mesquite, Texas | Dallas Police shot a murder suspect during a traffic stop near the Town East Mall. No body camera footage of the incident has been shared with the public. |
| 2025-12-19 | Samuel Mittler (40) | Unknown | Tonasket, Washington | U.S. Marshals along with Washing State Patrol SWAT team were executing a nationwide arrest warrant on a subject. During the encounter, the subject armed himself with a shotgun before he was fatally shot by officers. No body camera footage of the incident has been shared with the public. |
| 2025-12-19 | Eric Jerrod Davis (38) | Unknown | Rochester, New York | A man reported that his girlfriend's ex-boyfriend was trying to break into his house. When RPD officers arrived and encountered him, they were being shot at unprovokedly. Two officers were shot on scene. When the third officer located him a few blocks away, he shot the officer before being fatally shot. The caller was also shot and injured.Police released the footage. |
| 2025-12-19 | Amos Matthews (51) | Black | Opp, Alabama | Police were called for a man, Matthews, who was armed with a gun walking around in the residential area on Friday morning. During the encounter, a shootout occurred but he managed to escape. Following a manhunt, officers along with an ALEA special agent located and fatally shot him when he attempted to evade again. No body camera footage of the incident has been shared with the public. |
| 2025-12-19 | Quinn Swaggart (26) | Unknown | Belton, Missouri | Police responded to a report that a man was threatening a family member with a knife at a home. As officers spoke with the 911 caller outside, the subject exited the home with a knife and allegedly chased an officer, leading him to shoot the man. No body camera footage of the incident has been shared with the public. |
| 2025-12-19 | Jose Blanco Espinoza (49) | Hispanic | Baytown, Texas | Baytown Police officers shot and killed a suspect who advanced toward them with a knife after responding to a family disturbance call at an apartment complex. A woman, who was the mother of the suspect's children, was found dead during the search. No body camera footage of the incident has been shared with the public. |
| 2025-12-18 | Bravo Nondo (45) | Black | Nanuet, New York | An off-duty NYPD police officer from Albany, New York struck and killed a man, who just exited his stopped car, with his marked Ford Explorer. |
| 2025-12-18 | Paul Alvarez (16) | Hispanic | West Seneca, New York | An off-duty Cheektowaga police officer struck and killed a pedestrian with his vehicle. |
| 2025-12-18 | Juan Guerrero Rojo (38) | Hispanic | Los Angeles, California | LAPD responded to a report of a suicidal man and encountered Rojo, who was armed with a knife in front of the apartment. He ran toward them before officers opened fire. Less-lethal means were ineffective.Police released the footage. |
| 2025-12-17 | Dustin R. Griffin (42) | White | Staunton, Virginia | Deputies from the narcotics unit attempted to arrest a person on a warrant. During the arrest, one deputy was shot in the arm, and deputies shot and killed the subject of the warrant.Police released the footage. |
| 2025-12-16 | Kevin Dean Hammer (50) | White | Bear Creek, North Carolina | Chatham County Sheriff's Office responded to an armed standoff which escalated to a hostage situation at a residence. A deputy was shot and injured while the suspect was killed during the exchange of gunfire. The hostage was safely rescued. No body camera footage of the incident has been shared with the public. |
| 2025-12-16 | Marc Dutch (42) | Unknown | Albuquerque, New Mexico | Bernalillo County Sheriff's deputies attempted to stop a motorcyclist before he fled. At some point after locating him, deputies fatally shot him. No body camera footage of the incident has been shared with the public. |
| 2025-12-16 | Justin Robinson (30) | White | Sweetwater, Tennessee | Police were called to a report of a shoplifter near a Walgreens between U.S. Route 11 and SR-68. A detective found Robinson and shot him after he allegedly pulled out a knife. No body camera footage of the incident has been shared with the public. |
| 2025-12-15 | unidentified female | Unknown | Bryant, Arkansas | Saline County SWAT team came to a home to arrest a woman. During the confrontation, she refused to exit and shot at SWAT officers with a handgun. The officers returned fire, fatally striking her. No body camera footage of the incident has been shared with the public. |
| 2025-12-14 | Gary Lane Graber (27) | Unknown | Seabrook, Texas | A Baytown police officer struck and killed a pedestrian with his patrol car on TX-146 near Shoreacres. No body camera footage of the incident has been shared with the public. |
| 2025-12-14 | Jeremiah Dobbins | Unknown | Mount Pleasant, Tennessee | Deputies were called to a home to locate Dobbins. Upon finding him, deputies shot Dobbins after he allegedly produced a weapon. No body camera footage of the incident has been shared with the public. |
| 2025-12-14 | unidentified male | Unknown | Moreno Valley, California | Riverside County sheriff's deputies were dispatched to a residential fire, where they found a house was engulfed in flames and encountered the suspected arsonist, who was lying on the ground. The man pointed a gun at them before being shot.Police released the footage. |
| 2025-12-14 | Deshay Brian Turner (20) | Black | St. Cloud, Florida | Osceola County deputies responded to an alarm report at the Starling Chevrolet GMC dealership involving multiple people loitering. Officers discovered an Orlando man in his vehicle, who had 17 prior felony arrests, who believe it was not his, before taking off. The man led officers on a foot pursuit through a nearby Wawa parking lot before being found hiding in nearby bushes. The man brandished a firearm, before officers fatally shot him. Two officers were placed on administrative leave following the shooting. No body camera footage of the incident has been shared with the public. |
| 2025-12-13 | William Huertas (45) | Hispanic | Orangeburg, New York | An off-duty NYPD officer fatally struck a pedestrian in a crash. |
| 2025-12-13 | unidentified male | Unknown | Holbrook, Arizona | Navajo County deputies along with state troopers were pursuing a vehicle before the chase ended in Holbrook. During the standoff, an exchanged of gunfire occurred which left the suspect dead. No body camera footage of the incident has been shared with the public. |
| 2025-12-13 | unidentified male | Unknown | Tuttle, Oklahoma | Police pursued a vehicle from Mustang, during which the passenger allegedly shot at police. Following the chase, the passenger broke into a nearby home and was shot by a state trooper. No body camera footage of the incident has been shared with the public. |
| 2025-12-13 | Michael Hughes (49) | White | South Williamsport, Pennsylvania | Police were called to a report that Hughes was threatening to shoot someone. After making contact with Hughes, officers shot him after he allegedly pointed the gun at them. No body camera footage of the incident has been shared with the public. |
| 2025-12-12 | Ray Vital (46) | Unknown | Beaumont, Texas | Police pursued a man on the highway following a domestic dispute with shots fired in Port Arthur. After he crashed, officers shot and killed the man after he allegedly fired at them. No body camera footage of the incident has been shared with the public. |
| 2025-12-12 | Darrius Bentley (35) | Black | Titusville, Florida | During a pursuit of a speeding suspect, police deployed stop sticks twice hitting the man's vehicle. The man ultimately lost control of the vehicle before hitting a palm tree, killing himself. No body camera footage of the incident has been shared with the public. |
| 2025-12-12 | Joanthan Lunceford (55) | White | De Soto, Kansas | Johnson County deputies responded to a stabbing report involving two men at the Panasonic Energy Corporation of North America battery plant. After officers arrived, they spotted the male victim with multiple stab wounds before engaging with the male suspect from Blue Springs, Missouri afterward. Officers opened fire, killing the suspect on-scene. The male victim was taken to a nearby hospital in critical condition. No body camera footage of the incident has been shared with the public. |
| 2025-12-11 | unidentified male | White | Morton, Mississippi | Deputies pursued a man who was reported for attempting to enter vehicles in a parking lot. The suspect collided with a cement truck, a passenger vehicle, and an occupied school bus, after which deputies shot him. No body camera footage of the incident has been shared with the public. |
| 2025-12-11 | Isaias Sanchez Barboza (31) | Hispanic | Rio Grande City, Texas | A Border Patrol agent shot and killed a suspected smuggler after a fight broke out while suspects were moving narcotics across the Rio Grande. No body camera footage of the incident has been shared with the public. |
| 2025-12-09 | Johndy Lading Rodriguez (29) | Hispanic | Greenville, South Carolina | Greenville County deputies responded to an assault report at an apartment and shot Rodriguez, who was armed with a knife. Police released the footage. |
| 2025-12-09 | Scott Glenn Cumper (54) | White | Koylton Township, Michigan | State troopers arrived at a Kingston, Michigan man's residence to pick him up on a mental health order and found him in a car. Troopers shot and killed the man after he fired at them, hitting a sergeant in the hand. No body camera footage of the incident has been shared with the public. |
| 2025-12-09 | Roberto Calvario, Jr. (20) | Hispanic | Chicago, Illinois | Police were conducting an investigation in the West Ridge neighborhood when they noticed two men attempting to enter a stolen sedan. When officers approached, one of the men entered the sedan. Officers tried to pull the man out of the car and shot him when he started driving, dragging an officer. The footage was released by COPA. |
| 2025-12-09 | Robert Thompson (43) | White | Mooreland, Oklahoma | Thompson, a man suspected of reckless driving, was fatally shot by MPD officers and Woodward County deputies after he shot at them. No body camera footage of the incident has been shared with the public. |
| 2025-12-08 | Alex Canizales (40) | Hispanic | Los Angeles, California | LAPD officers responded to an assault with a deadly weapon call in Reseda and located the suspect in a 7-Eleven parking lot. Officers shot and killed the man, who was armed with a gun. The footage was released. |
| 2025-12-07 | Corey Tinnes (30) | White | Columbus, Ohio | A Columbus Police cruiser collided with another driver while the officer was responding to a burglary in progress call with lights and sirens on. Witness said the officer ran through a red light when the other driver, driving a first-generation Chevrolet Silverado, was making a turn. The driver, Tinnes, died in the incident. Columbus Police released the footage. |
| 2025-12-07 | Shacoby Kenny (32) | Black | Boston, Massachusetts | Kenny, an inmate in South Bay Jail, was restrained by corrections officers after he reportedly tried to escape. He was beaten and guards put him in a chokehold. He died at the hospital a day later. His death had been ruled a homicide by the coroner's office. No body camera footage of the incident has been shared with the public. |
| 2025-12-07 | Michael Frank Breuer (75) | White | Phoenix, Arizona | A man was seen walking around a neighborhood near Arizona State Route 101 in the Desert Valley area with a gun. A Phoenix officer later located him. The officer shot the man when he approached and raised the gun toward the officer. The footage was released. It was later determined that the man made both the 911 calls. |
| 2025-12-07 | Nathan Arthur Dew (61) | Unknown | Dixon, California | DPD officers responded to a report of a man parking in the middle of the streets near a Chevron gas station, starring straight but unresponsive. Upon arrival, the man fled which led to a vehicular pursuit. At some point, he pulled over and reportedly pulled a BB gun on officers in his vehicle. Officers fatally shot him. No body camera footage of the incident has been shared with the public. |
| 2025-12-06 | Jean Joseph (61) | Unknown | Boynton Beach, Florida | An off-duty Palm Beach County deputy shot a man dead under unknown circumstances. |
| 2025-12-06 | Alberto Arzola (19) | Hispanic | Anaheim, California | An APD Gang Unit officer fatally shot a man after he chased the man from an unmarked vehicle. A gun was recovered at the scene. More than a dozen subjects were detained when an unruly crowd gathered. Two officers were injured while another individual was struck by less-lethal projectiles. The footage was released by police. |
| 2025-12-06 | Scott Patrick Seagle (48) | White | Granite Falls, North Carolina | First responders responded to a crashed where they encountered Seagle, a Hickory resident who was armed with a handgun. A state trooper fatally shot him as he ignored commands and kept flashing the gun. No body camera footage of the incident has been shared with the public. |
| 2025-12-06 | Martin Martinez Sr. (51) | Hispanic | Grand Rapids, Michigan | Police were called to a home for a welfare check on a man involved in a domestic dispute. Officers followed him after seeing him driving away from the home. After pulling him over, police shot the man when he fired at them. His family members revealed that he had been struggling emotionally due to the unsolved killing of his son. The footage was released. |
| 2025-12-06 | Nickenley Turenne (24) | Black | Manchester, New Hampshire | Police responded to the area of South Mammoth Road in Manchester for a report of a suspicious vehicle. A pursuit ensued, ending with a motor vehicle crash after which Turenne fled the scene. A foot pursuit followed, and in an encounter with police in the area of South Mammoth Road, three officers shot Turenne after mistaking a flashlight for a gun. Lifesaving measures were attempted, and Turenne was transported to the hospital, where he later died. Body-camera footage was released in 2026. |
| 2025-12-05 | Alice Nesdahl (47) | Native American | Grand Forks, North Dakota | A Grand Forks County deputy fatally shot Nesdahl while she was holding a knife against a male hostage.The footage was released. |
| 2025-12-05 | Shuron David Malone (30) | Black | Kissimmee, Florida | Osceola County Police responded to a domestic battery incident at a home, where they confronted an armed barricaded suspect who made suicidal remarks. After negotiation efforts failed, deputies deployed chemical agent, forcing him to exit. He eventually lie on the ground outside before he fired his weapon, prompting deputies to return fire, killing him. No body camera footage of the incident has been shared with the public. |
| 2025-12-04 | Amarion Thomas (17) | Black | Vicksburg, Mississippi | Thomas was wanted for burglary and shooting an occupied police vehicle in November. When VPD officers attempted to execute a warrant, Thomas reportedly pulled a gun on them before he was shot. No body camera footage of the incident has been shared with the public. |
| 2025-12-04 | unidentified male | Unknown | Paramount, California | A woman reported that her boyfriend was outside her house with a gun. When LASD deputies arrived, they encountered the man holding a two-year-old toddler hostage. After a 25 minutes standoff, the man reportedly pointed the gun at deputies before they shot him. No body camera footage of the incident has been shared with the public. |
| 2025-12-04 | La'Andre Marktanne Thomas (27) | Black | Sandy Springs, Georgia | Sandy Springs officers responded to an assault near a bus stop before encountering an armed man, Thomas. Thomas reportedly pulled a gun on them and was fatally shot. Thomas was a former defensive back for the University of Memphis football team. No body camera footage of the incident has been shared with the public. |
| 2025-12-04 | Casey Barnes (32) | White | Hurstbourne Acres, Kentucky | LMPD officers responded to a call of a man pointing a gun at a woman. Police located the suspect, Barnes, and shot him after he raised the gun.Police released the footage. In the footage, Barnes' gun cannot be seen, he is too far away from the officers' cameras to be seen in the footage. Officers shot lethally without asking whether he was carrying a permit. Whether Barnes was aiming is not visible in the footage. |
| 2025-12-03 | Spencer Davis Woodson Forsling (22) | White | Blacksburg, Virginia | A Blacksburg officer fatally struck a Virginia Tech student who was crossing the road in a crash. No body camera footage of the incident has been shared with the public. |
| 2025-12-03 | Howard Sye (31) | Black | Essex, Maryland | Baltimore County Police responded to a domestic violence call which was upgraded to a stabbing while officers were en route. After officers arrived at the apartment building, they shot and killed a man armed with a knife and punched an officer. A woman was found stabbed to death inside the apartment. The footage was released. |
| 2025-12-03 | Charles Murray (29) | White | Victorville, California | SBSD deputies were attempting to serve a search warrant and were fired upon by the barricaded suspect. They returned fire, fatally striking him. No body camera footage of the incident has been shared with the public. |
| 2025-12-03 | Nicolas Quaranta (54) | Unknown | Sterling Heights, Michigan | A man who was believed to be suffering mental illness was shot and killed by Sterling Heights officers during a welfare check after reportedly pointing a gun at them. No body camera footage of the incident has been shared with the public. |
| 2025-12-03 | Joshua Bonilla (30) | Unknown | Los Angeles, California | Police responded to a call of a man suffering from a mental health issue. When police arrived, they saw an adult male stabbing his father with a pair of scissors and before they shot him. Both individuals were pronounced dead on-scene. LAPD released the footage. |
| 2025-12-03 | Juan Melgar-Ayala (28) | Hispanic | Omaha, Nebraska | A man in his 50s was shot several times in the chest. Police followed the shooter to a bathroom inside of a QuikTrip gas station in the Hanscom area where he opened fire on them, injuring three officers, before being shot and killed. A still image of the suspect pointing a gun at police was shown in the DHS report.No body camera footage of the incident has been shared with the public. |
| 2025-12-02 | Kristopher Lee Johnson (43) | White | St. Augustine, Florida | St Johns County Police received a call from Johnson and heard that he fired shots after him ordering the victim to get on his knees. The victim managed to escape and Johnson was found driving the victim's abandoned car and began looking for him. Deputies later performed a PIT maneuver on the vehicle to stop it. Johnson reportedly walked toward traffic with a gun despite their commands when they shot him. No body camera footage of the incident has been shared with the public. |
| 2025-12-02 | Christopher Barata (21) | Hispanic | Palmetto Estates, Florida | Miami-Dade Sheriff's Office tactical team was attempting to serve a search warrant at a home as a part of child porn investigation. When they entered, an armed man, who was a former TSA agent at Miami International Airport, confronted them before deputies fatally shot him. No body camera footage of the incident has been shared with the public. |
| 2025-12-02 | Christian Nelson (29) | Black | Seattle, Washington | A man was reportedly seen waving a gun around near Othello light rail station. Responding SPD officers shot and killed him as he pointed the gun at them. Police released the footage. |
| 2025-12-02 | Marvin Morales (40) | Hispanic | Lodi, California | A woman called police to report Morales assaulting their 11-year-old son, which she witnessed over cameras in their Elk Grove home. Elk Grove Police responded and found the boy with stab wounds; he died at the hospital. Police and Sacramento County Sheriff's deputies pursued Morales south into San Joaquin County, where they shot Morales after he crashed and exited the car with a rifle. Morales was a former Sacramento County Sheriff's deputy. He was fired on October 24, 2023 after overdosing on seized fentanyl he mistook for methamphetamines and smoked in the department bathroom. The footage was released by police. |
| 2025-12-01 | Robert Foster (40) | White | Nevada County, Arkansas | Police were searching for Foster, from Texas, for felony warrants. He was located in Stamps, leading to a pursuit that ended in Nevada County in Falcon. Following a stand-off, SWAT officers shot Foster after he allegedly fired at them. No body camera footage of the incident has been shared with the public. |
| 2025-12-01 | Markieth O. Bryson, Jr. (28) | Unknown | Roanoke, Virginia | Task force officers with the U.S. Marshals Service attempted a traffic stop in the West View area on the wanted local man during the late-afternoon hours before allegedly fleeing the scene, hitting several police vehicles, and breaking into a home in the Gainsboro area. During a standoff with officers for several hours, Bryson produced a weapon and was fatally shot by Virginia State Police tactical officers after engaging with Bryson. He was pronounced dead on-scene. No body camera footage of the incident has been shared with the public. |
| 2025-12-01 | James Ellis Forrestal Peattie (58) | Unknown | Bakersfield, California | Police pursued a man accused of violating a domestic violence restraining order from Wasco to Bakersfield, where the man allegedly shot at police. After the car was disabled, Wasco Police killed the suspect in a shoot-out between the suspect and officers (including California Highway Patrol units). No body camera footage of the incident has been shared with the public. |
| 2025-12-01 | Dylan Burl Rice (39) | White | Cartersville, Georgia | Deputies and fire marshals were at Rice's home to serve a search warrant during the early-evening hours. After deploying flashbangs, Rice, a local resident, exited the house while holding a pellet air rifle, and deputies fatally shot him, killing him on-scene. Police reported that Rice had been released from Bartow County custody after being arrested that June on a separate criminal trespassing incident. No body camera footage of the incident has been shared with the public. |
| 2025-12-01 | Frankie Salvatore Riccio (32) | White | Port St. Lucie, Florida | Six Port St. Lucie officers responded to a call involving Riccio, a Tradition, Florida resident, appeared holding an assault rifle, describing the call as a neighbor dispute involving mental health issues as well as him abusing marijuana. After arriving on-scene during the evening hours, a shoot-out occurred, with one Port St. Lucie officer being struck twice in the face. Riccio was then shot by another officer and died at the scene. The footage was released by police. |

== See also ==
- Death in custody § United States
- Henry A. Wallace Police Crime Public Database
- List of cases of police brutality
- List of countries with annual rates and counts for killings by law enforcement officers
- List of law enforcement officers killed in the line of duty in the United States
- List of law enforcement officers convicted for an on-duty killing in the United States
- List of shootings by US immigration agents
- List of police reforms related to the George Floyd protests
- List of unarmed African Americans killed by law enforcement officers in the United States
- Lists of killings by law enforcement officers
- Police brutality in the United States
- Police misconduct § United States
- Police riot § United States
- Police use of deadly force in the United States
