= Leela Savasta =

Canadian actress

- Born: Vancouver, British Columbia, Canada
- Occupation: Actress
- Years active: 2006-2015
- Website: www.leelasavasta.com

Leela Savasta is a Canadian actress. She played Clair Crosby in the 2006 film Black Christmas. She is best known for her supporting roles in the television shows Battlestar Galactica as Tracey Anne, Cra$h & Burn as Lucia Silva, and Intelligence as Lorna Salazar.

== Life and career ==
Savasta was born in Vancouver, British Columbia, Canada, where she currently resides. She has appeared in such television shows as Smallville, Intelligence, Supernatural and the Showtime series Masters of Horror. She played the characters Dr. Esposito and then Captain Alicia Vega in two episodes of the fifth season of Stargate: Atlantis, and had a recurring role on Battlestar Galactica as Tracey Anne. She played the girlfriend of Douglas Fargo in season 3.5 of the TV show Eureka.

Savasta starred as Lucia, the girlfriend of lead character Jimmy Burn (Luke Kirby), on the Showcase television drama Cra$h & Burn. She also stars in the Lifetime docudrama The Craigslist Killer, alongside Jake McDorman, William Baldwin, and Agnes Bruckner. Savasta plays Julissa Brisman, a masseuse allegedly murdered by Philip Markoff in Boston in 2009.

She had a role in the 2012 film This Means War, starring Chris Pine, Tom Hardy, and Reese Witherspoon.

== Filmography ==
=== Film ===
Year	Title	Role	Notes
2006	Black Christmas	Clair Crosby	
2007	Integrity of the Amish	Heather	Short film
2012	This Means War	Kelly	
2014	Hastings Street	Melody	Direct to video
2014	Joy Ride 3: Roadkill	Alisa Rosado	Direct to video
2014	Big Eyes	Hippie Chick	
2015	Santa's Little Helper	Tanya	Direct to video

=== Television ===
Year	Title	Role	Notes
2005	Smallville	Talon Girl #2	Episode: "Spirit"
2006	Masters of Horror	Elise Wolfram	Episode: "Haeckel's Tale"
2006	Smallville	Gretchen Winters	Episode: "Tomb"
2006	A Girl Like Me: The Gwen Araujo Story	Chita Araujo	Television film
2006	Supernatural	Lindsey	Episode: "Children Shouldn't Play with Dead Things"
2007	Cleaverville	Laura	Television film
2007	Stargate: Atlantis	Dr. Rafaela Esposito	Episode: "Tao of Rodney"
2007	Traveler	Liz	Episode: "The Reunion"
2007	Psych	Nanny	Episode: "Rob-a-Bye Baby"
2007	Bionic Woman	Shawna	Episode: "Pilot"
2007	Intelligence	Lorna Salazar	10 episodes
2008–2009	Battlestar Galactica	Tracey Anne	6 episodes
2008	Stargate: Atlantis	Captain Alicia Vega	2 episodes
2009	Knights of Bloodsteel	Fileen	2 episodes
2009	Eureka	Julia Golden	2 episodes
2009–2010	Cra$h & Burn	Lucia Silva	13 episodes
2010	CSI: Miami	Nina Castillo	Episode: "Blood Sugar"
2011	The Craigslist Killer	Julissa Brisman	Television film
2012	Transporter: The Series	Rebecca Pissarro	Episode: "The Switch"
2014	Heavenly Match	Cali	Television film
