= List of Molly Parker performances =

Molly Parker filmography
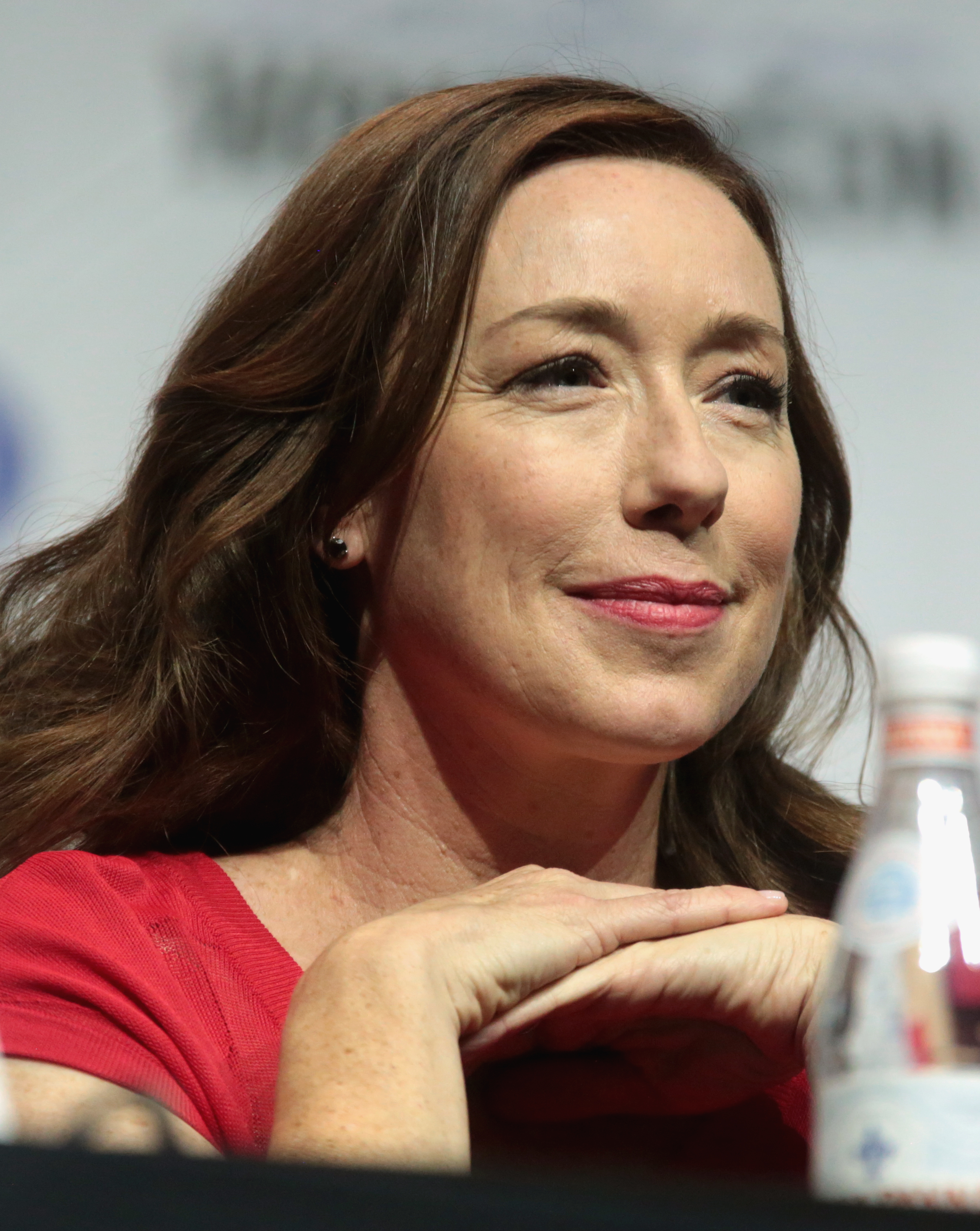
- Parker at the 2018 WonderCon
- Film: 49
- Television series: 49
- Theatre: 2

Molly Parker is a Canadian actress who began her career in 1991 appearing in television productions. After appearing in several films, including the teen comedy Just One of the Girls (1993), and the television film Serving in Silence (1995), Parker was cast as a necrophiliac medical student in the controversial drama film Kissed (1996). She subsequently portrayed Chyna Shepherd in the television thriller film Intensity (1997), and appeared in a supporting role in the historical drama film Sunshine (1999).

Parker made her first major American film, Waking the Dead, in 2000, and garnered mainstream recognition for her portrayal of Alma Garret on the HBO series Deadwood, from 2004 to 2006. Throughout the 2000s, Parker also appeared in numerous films, including the drama Nine Lives (2005), the horror film The Wicker Man (2006), and the thriller The Road (2009). Parker guest-starred on the series Dexter in 2011, and subsequently guest-starred in three seasons of the Netflix political thriller series House of Cards between 2014 and 2016. Parker starred in three additional Netflix projects in 2017: the crime film Small Crimes, the Stephen King film adaptation 1922, and Errol Morris's docudrama series Wormwood. Beginning 2018, she began starring as Maureen Robinson in Netflix's Lost in Space.

== Film ==
Year	Title	Role	Notes	Ref.
1993	Hate Mail	Maggie	Short film	
1993	Just One of the Girls	Lynne	Also known as Anything for Love	
1995	Last of the Dogmen	Nurse		
1995	Wings of Courage	Jean's Dance Partner	Uncredited	
1995	Ebbie	Fran	(both mother and daughter)	
1996	Hard Core Logo	Jenifur		
1996	Kissed	Sandra Larson		
1996	The Chain	Mathilde	Short film; also executive producer	
1997	Bliss	Connie		
1998	Under Heaven	Cynthia		
1998	From Morning on I Waited Yesterday	Lina	Short film	
1999	Wonderland	Molly		
1999	The Five Senses	Anna Miller		
1999	Sunshine	Hannah Whippler		
1999	The Intruder	Daisy		
1999	Ladies Room	Julia		
2000	Waking the Dead	Juliet Beck		
2000	Suspicious River	Leila Murray		
2001	The War Bride	Sylvia		
2001	The Center of the World	Florence		
2001	Last Wedding	Sarah		
2001	Rare Birds	Alice		
2002	Men with Brooms	Amy Foley		
2002	Looking for Leonard	Monica	Also executive producer	
2002	Marion Bridge	Agnes		
2002	Max	Nina Rothman		
2002	Pure	Mel		
2004	The Good Shepherd	Madeline Finney		
2005	Nine Lives	Lisa		
2005	Break a Leg	Kate		
2006	The Wicker Man	Sister Rose / Sister Thorn		
2006	Hollywoodland	Laurie Simo		
2006	Who Loves the Sun	Maggie Claire		
2009	The Road	Motherly Woman		
2010	Trigger	Kat		
2010	Oliver Sherman	Irene Page		
2011	That's What I Am	Sherri Nichol		
2012	The Playroom	Donna Cantwell		
2013	Hold Fast	Aunt Ellen		
2016	Darwin	Lillian		
2016	The 9th Life of Louis Drax	Dalton		
2016	Weirdos	Laura		
2016	American Pastoral	Dr. Sheila Smith		
2017	Small Crimes	Charlotte Boyd		
2017	1922	Arlette James		
2017	Birds	—N/a	Writer and director	
2018	Madeline's Madeline	Evangeline		
2018	Magic Bullet	Rachel	Short film	
2020	Words on Bathroom Walls	Beth Petrazelli		
2020	Pieces of a Woman	Eva Woodward		
2021	Jockey	Ruth Wilkies		
2021	The Mothership		Filmed in 2021, ultimately unreleased	
2023	Peter Pan & Wendy	Mary Darling		
2024	You Gotta Believe	Kathy Kelly		

== Television ==
Year	Title	Role	Notes	Ref.
1991	My Son Johnny	Lori Spoda	Television film	
1991	Neon Rider	Dora "Susie" Brody	Episode: "Parent's Day"	
1992	Neon Rider	Kate	Episode: "The Good, the Bad, and Eleanor"	
1992	Nightmare Cafe	Ivy	Episode: "Fay & Ivy"	
1993	The Substitute	Courtney	Television film	
1993	Madison	Karen	Episode: "Tough Cries"	
1994	One More Mountain	Eliza Williams	Television film	
1994	Paris or Somewhere	Peg Kennedy	Television film	
1994	Neon Rider	Gloria Miller	Episode: "St. Vincent"	
1995	The Marshal	Teri Sinclair	Episode: "Pilot"	
1995	Serving in Silence	Lynette	Television film	
1995	Falling from the Sky: Flight 174 (aka Freefall: Flight 174)	Norma Sax	Television film	
1995	The Ranger, the Cook and a Hole in the Sky	Sue	Television film	
1995	The Outer Limits	Jennifer	Episode: "If These Walls Could Talk"	
1995	Deceived by Trust: A Moment of Truth Movie	Rachel Morton	Television film	
1995	Highlander: The Series	Alice Ramsey	Episode: "The Wrath of Kali"	
1995	Ebbie	Francine "Frannie"	Television film	
1995	Little Criminals	Social Worker	Television film	
1996	The Sentinel	The Switchman	Episode: "The Switchman"	
1996	Lonesome Dove: The Outlaw Years	Frances Phillips	2 episodes	
1996	Poltergeist: The Legacy	Liz Barrow	Episode: "Do Not Go Gently"	
1996	Titanic	Lulu Foley	Television miniseries	
1997	Contagious	Flt. Att. Stephanie	Television film	
1997	Intensity	Chyna Shepherd	Television film	
1998–2000	Twitch City	Hope	Main role (13 episodes)	
2002	Six Feet Under	Rabbi Ari	Episodes: "Back to the Garden", "The Liar and the Whore"	
2004	Iron Jawed Angels	Emily Leighton	Television film	
2004–2006	Deadwood	Alma Garret	Main role (35 episodes)	
2006	Odd Job Jack	Alberta Malone (voice)	Episode: "Jack Ryder and the Fountain of Life"	
2008	Swingtown	Susan Miller	Main role (13 episodes)	
2009	Party Down	Melinda Weintraub	Episode: "James Rolf High School 20th Reunion"	
2010	Boardwalk Empire	Mabel Thompson	Episode: "Boardwalk Empire"; photo only	
2010	Human Target	Rebecca Brooks	Episode: "The Wife's Tale"	
2010	Shattered	Ella Sullivan	Main role (6 episodes)	
2010	The Wonderful Maladys	Mary Malady	Television pilot	
2010	The Quinn-tuplets	Rebecca Quinn-Adatto	Television film	
2011	Gone	Amy Kettering	Television film	
2011	Dexter	Lisa Marshall	4 episodes	
2011	Meet Jane	Jane Bilinski	Television film	
2012	Hemingway & Gellhorn	Pauline Pfeiffer	Television film	
2012	The Firm	Abby McDeere	Main role (22 episodes)	
2013	Motive	Chloe Myton	Episode: "Public Enemy"	
2013	Pete's Christmas	Dr. Pamela Kidder	Television film	
2014	Outlaw Prophet: Warren Jeffs	Janine Jeffs	Television film	
2014–2016	House of Cards	Jackie Sharp	Regular role (25 episodes)	
2015	Heritage Minutes	Narrator	Voice role	
2016	Goliath	Callie Senate	Main role (8 episodes)	
2017	Wormwood	Alice Olson	Main role (4 episodes)	
2018–2021	Lost in Space	Maureen Robinson	Main role (28 episodes)	
2019	Deadwood: The Movie	Alma Ellsworth	Television film	
2023	Accused	Laura Broder	Episode: "Laura's Story"	
2023	Essex County	Annie	Main role (5 episodes)	
2025–present	Doc	Dr. Amy Larson	Main role; also producer	

== Theatre ==
Year	Title	Role	Venue	Ref.
1996	The Passion of Dracula	Wilhelmina Murray	Arts Club Theatre Company	
2015	Harper Regan	Harper Regan	Bluma Appel Theatre	

== See also ==
- List of awards and nominations received by Molly Parker

== Sources ==
- Pratley, Gerald (2003). A Century of Canadian Cinema: Gerald Pratley's Feature Film Guide, 1900 to the Present. Toronto, Ontario: Lynx Images. ISBN 978-1-894-07321-9.
- Riggs, Thomas (2006). Contemporary Theatre, Film, and Television. Vol. 68. Detroit, Michigan: Thomson Gale. ISBN 978-0-787-69041-0.
