= Suffolk County Jail =

Suffolk County Jail could refer to:

- Charles Street Jail, also known as the Suffolk County Jail, an 1851 era former prison in Boston.
- Nashua Street Jail, its replacement, located next to the Science Park (MBTA station).
