= The Craigslist Killer (film) =

- Promotional poster displaying the premiere date
- Genre: True crime
- Written by: Donald Martin; Stephen Tolkin
- Directed by: Stephen Kay
- Starring: Jake McDorman; Agnes Bruckner; Josh Close; Julia Campbell; Kevin Kilner; Sam McMurray; Judith Hoag; Candice Patton; Leela Savasta; Trieste Dunn; William Baldwin
- Theme music composer: Tree Adams
- Country of origin: United States
- Original language: English

Production
- Producer: Kyle A. Clark
- Cinematography: Jamie Barber
- Editor: Hunter M. Via
- Running time: 87 minutes
- Production companies: Peace Out Productions; Sony Pictures Television

Original release
- Network: Lifetime
- Release: January 3, 2011

The Craigslist Killer, also stylized as the//craigslist.killer in some promotional images, is a 2011 American crime drama television film directed by Stephen Kay, written by Donald Martin and Stephen Tolkin, and starring Jake McDorman, Agnes Bruckner, Kevin Kilner, and William Baldwin. It follows the dark, mysterious life of murderer Philip Markoff.

The film aired on Lifetime and is an adaptation of the true crime book A Date with Death: The Secret Life of the Accused "Craigslist Killer", written by Michele McPhee.

== Plot ==
Philip Markoff (McDorman) prepares for a promising future as a doctor and a life of happiness with his fiancée, Megan McAllister (Bruckner). Seemingly destined for greatness as one of Boston University’s brightest medical students, Markoff could do no wrong in the eyes of Megan, his friends, fellow students, and professors. But hidden from those close to him was the violent wrath only he and his victims knew — beginning with his April 14, 2009 murder of Julissa Brisman, a masseuse who advertised her services on Craigslist. When police discover that the brutal killing and a number of other attacks on women were all connected to advertisements placed on Craigslist, their investigation ultimately leads them to Markoff. Investigating the case are detectives Bennett (Baldwin) and Frye (Close).

== Cast ==
- Jake McDorman as Philip Markoff
- Agnes Bruckner as Megan McAllister
- Josh Close as Detective Frye
- Julia Campbell as Susan McAllister
- Kevin Kilner as David McAllister
- William Baldwin as Detective Bennett
- Sam McMurray as Dr. Janeway
- Judith Hoag as Patricia Banks
- Candice Patton as Kate
- Leela Savasta as Julissa Brisman
- Trieste Dunn as Trisha Leffler
- Kerry Knuppe as Janet

== Production ==
The film adapts the book A Date with Death: The Secret Life of the Accused "Craigslist Killer", written by Michele McPhee. Stephen K. Kay was brought on to direct the film, based on a script written by Donald Martin and Stephen Tolkin. Development on the film began prior to the death of Philip Markoff, who was believed to have been responsible for several robberies and murders.

Of the film, executive producer Judith Verno noted that they did not speak to Markoff's ex-fiancée Megan McAllister but that they "tried to be very respectful of that fact that she loved him and that she had no knowledge of his crimes" and that what the network found compelling were the questions "What attracted us to the story (was the idea of), how well do you really know someone?...When you are looking at a person who on the surface has so much going for them, trying to understand why they would do these kinds of things and then knowing we might never know”.

== Release ==
The Craigslist Killer premiered on January 3, 2011 on Lifetime. Ratings numbers for the film were high, securing 5.4 million viewers. This made it Lifetime's top film in the adults 25-54 demographic in a two year span, which was surpassed by the network's release of Drew Peterson: Untouchable the following year. The film was later described as one of the network's "top-five true-crime offerings" in 2018.

== Reception ==
Reviews for The Craigslist Killer have been negative. Much of the criticism focused on the lack of information or insight for the murders, which outlets such as The New York Times felt was a result of Markoff's death before any explanations for the crimes could be obtained. The Repository reviewed The Craigslist Killer, which they felt was "every bit as sleazy as you’d expect." Neil Genzlinger of The New York Times criticized the filmmakers for the use of "cheesy sound effects" used to "signal his switch from perfect-man mode to psychopath."

Horror website HorrorNews.net was more favorable, praising the movie for its pacing and noting that they enjoyed it more than other Lifetime movies they had watched. Since the film's release in 2011 USA Today and Flavorwire have both included the film on their lists of "Top 10 Lifetime movies that we love to hate-watch" and "The 35 Campiest TV Movies Ever Made", respectively.
