= Cody Linley =

American actor (born 1989)

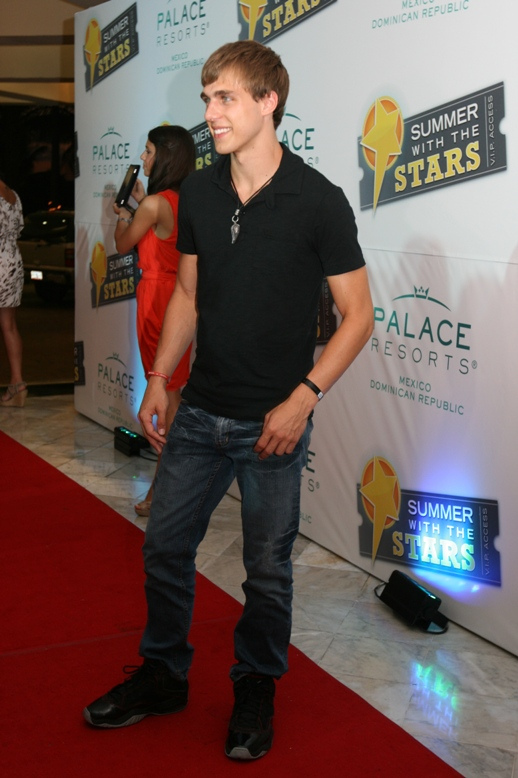
- Linley in 2011
- Born: November 20, 1989 (age 36); Lewisville, Texas, U.S.
- Occupations: Actor; singer; rapper; dancer
- Years active: 1994–present
- Parent: Cathryn Sullivan
- Musical career

Cody Linley (born November 20, 1989) is an American actor and singer. He played a recurring role as Jake Ryan in the television series Hannah Montana, and was a contestant on the seventh season of Dancing with the Stars, in which he was partnered with Julianne Hough and finished fourth.

== Acting career ==
Linley made his acting debut in the 1998 made-for-television film Still Holding On: The Legend of Cadillac Jack. Subsequently, he had supporting roles in four films released in 2000: My Dog Skip, Where the Heart Is, Walker, Texas Ranger, and Miss Congeniality. In 2003, Linley was in the independent film When Zachary Beaver Came to Town and appeared in the movie Cheaper by the Dozen as the bully Quinn. He also played a live-action version of Arnold in a commercial for Hey Arnold!: The Movie.

Other film and TV roles include a 10-episode stint as Jake Ryan in Hannah Montana, The Haunting Hour: Don't Think About It, Rebound, Hoot with Logan Lerman and Brie Larson, and That's So Raven as Daryl in the episode Five Finger Discount. Linley also co-hosted the 2008 Disney Channel Games.

=== Dancing with the Stars ===
Linley was a celebrity contestant on Dancing with the Stars for the seventh season, which premiered on September 22, 2008. He and his professional dance partner Julianne Hough were eliminated on November 18, finishing in fourth place. He was temporarily partnered with Edyta Śliwińska for two weeks when Julianne Hough was hospitalized on October 21, later diagnosed with endometriosis on October 27, and had to undergo surgery to remove her appendix on October 28.

Cody Linley - Dancing with the Stars (season 7)
Week	Dance	Music	Judges' scores (Note: Individual judges' scores are listed in the following order: Carrie Ann Inaba, Len Goodman, Bruno Tonioli.)			Total score	Result
1 (Night 1)	Cha-cha-cha	"Tilt Ya Head Back" — Nelly & Christina Aguilera	6	6	6	18	Safe
1 (Night 2)	Quickstep	"I Want You To Want Me" — Letters to Cleo	8	7	8	23	Safe
2	Rumba	"Bleeding Love" — Leona Lewis	7	7	7	21	Safe
3	Jive	"Call Me the Breeze" — Lynyrd Skynyrd	7	7	7	21	Safe
4	Tango	"Bohemian Like You" — The Dandy Warhols	7	8	8	23	Safe
5	Jitterbug	"Big Time Operator" — Big Bad Voodoo Daddy	10	9	9	28	Safe
6	Samba	"Whine Up" — Kat DeLuna, feat. Elephant Man	8	8 (Note: Michael Flatley filled in for Len Goodman as a guest judge this week.)	7	23	Safe
6	Group Hip hop	"It Takes Two" — Rob Base & DJ E-Z Rock	—N/a				Safe
7 (with Edyta Sliwinska)	Viennese waltz	"Have You Ever Really Loved a Woman?" — Bryan Adams	8	7	7	22	Safe
7 (with Edyta Sliwinska)	Team; Cha-cha-cha	"Mercy" — Duffy	6	7	7	20	Safe
8 (with Edyta Sliwinska)	Foxtrot	"Call Me Irresponsible" — Frank Sinatra	8	8	8	24	Safe
8 (with Edyta Sliwinska)	Mambo	"My Way" — Los Lonely Boys	8	8	8	24	Safe
9	Paso doble	"Le Disko" — Shiny Toy Guns	8	7	7	22	Eliminated
9	Salsa	"Juventud de Presente" — Tito Puente	8	8	8	24	Eliminated

== Personal life ==
Linley was born in Lewisville, Texas, the son of Cathryn Sullivan, an acting coach, and Lee Linley.

Linley is a member of the Hollywood Knights celebrity basketball team.

Linley also took acting classes with Logan Henderson.

Linley's brother, Chad Linley, died on August 4, 2011. He was 29 years old.

== Filmography ==
Year	Title	Role	Notes
1998	Still Holding On: The Legend of Cadillac Jack	Younger Tommy	
1999	Walker, Texas Ranger	Timmy	"Jacob's Ladder" (Season 7, Episode 22)
2000	Walker, Texas Ranger	Griffin Pope	"Desperate Measures" (Season 9, Episode 12)
1999	My Dog Skip	Spit McGee	
1999	Miss Congeniality	Tough Boy	
2000	Where the Heart Is	Brownie Coop	
2002	Beyond the Prairie 2: The True Story of Laura Wilder	Charlie Magnuson	
2003	When Zachary Beaver Came to Town	Cal	
2003	Cheaper by the Dozen	Quinn	
2004	That's So Raven	Daryl	"Five Finger Discount" (Season 3, Episode 5)
2005	Echoes of Innocence	Christopher	
2005	Rebound	Larry Burgess Jr.	
2006	Hoot	Mullet Fingers	
2007	The Haunting Hour: Don't Think About It	Sean Redford	
2006–2010	Hannah Montana	Jake Ryan	Recurring, 10 episodes
2008	The Hardy Boys: The Hidden Theft	Joe Hardy	Voice
2008	Dancing with the Stars	Himself	Contestant
2008	Disney Channel Games	Himself	Online Host
2009	Forget Me Not	Eli Channing	
2012	Melissa & Joey	Aiden	2 episodes
2012	The Playroom	Ryan	
2013	My Dog the Champion	Eli	
2014	Hoovey	Hoovey	
2016	Sharknado: The 4th Awakens	Matthew Shepard	
2017	Sharknado 5: Global Swarming	Matthew Shepard	
