= Haeckel's Tale =

- Masters of Horror episode
- DVD cover for "Haeckel's Tale"
- Episode no.: Season 1 Episode 12
- Directed by: John McNaughton
- Written by: Mick Garris
- Production code: 112
- Original air date: January 27, 2006

Guest appearances
- Steve Bacic; Derek Cecil; Pablo Coffey; Christopher DeLisle; Tom McBeath; Gerard Plunkett; Jon Polito; Leela Savasta

Episode chronology
← Previous "Pick Me Up"	Next → "Imprint"

"Haeckel's Tale" (also known as "Clive Barker's Haeckel's Tale") is the twelfth episode of the first season of the television series Masters of Horror. It originally aired in North America on January 27, 2006. George A. Romero was originally supposed to direct the episode but was replaced by John McNaughton because of a scheduling problem.

The episode script is based on a Clive Barker short story, first published in the anthology Dark Delicacies: Original Tales of Terror and the Macabre.

== Plot ==
=== Beginning ===
The story, set in the late 19th century, begins with a young man named Edward Ralston (Steve Bacic), coming to an old woman, Miz Carnation, who lives in an old cabin deep in the woods of upstate New York. Ralston asks Miz Carnation, a necromancer, to revive his recently deceased wife; she refuses, but then decides to tell him the story of Ernst Haeckel, and says that, if he still wishes to revive his wife afterwards, she will do as he asks.

=== Main story ===
The story mainly concerns Ernst Haeckel (Derek Cecil), who is trying to follow in the footsteps of Victor Frankenstein, but is unsuccessful with his attempts to create life. He learns of Montesquino, a necromancer, but believes that the man is a charlatan. Learning of his father's ill condition, he travels and encounters Walter Wolfram (Tom McBeath) and his wife Elise (Leela Savasta). Haeckel is oddly drawn to Elise and vice versa. Wolfram seems undisturbed by the attraction but when unearthly shrieks echo outside, Elise is drawn to them. Haeckel also notices that Elise is caring for a baby.

Elise finally goes outside and the despondent Wolfram notes that he cannot satisfy his wife, although he has sold everything he has to take care of her. Haeckel goes after Elise and follows the shrieks to a nearby necropolis. There he discovers that Elise is having sex with her dead husband and the other resurrected corpses. Wolfram has paid Montesquino to raise the dead so that they can satisfy Elise. When Wolfram tries to take her home, the corpses kill him. Haeckel confronts Montesquino and demands that he make it stop. The necromancer says that he cannot, and an angry Haeckel shoots him, as he tries to escape. The dying Montesquino shoves Haeckel into a tombstone, knocking him out.

The next morning, Haeckel wakes up and returns to the cabin, where he finds Elise nursing the baby: a corpse-child, the son of her "true" husband. The baby rips out Haeckel's throat. The next scene takes place again at the necropolis, except it is the dead Haeckel with whom Elise now has sex.

=== Conclusion ===
Miz Carnation concludes her tale and a disgusted Ralston looks on in horror as he realizes that she is the older Elise, as the corpses of her first husband, Wolfram, and Haeckel stagger in and she brings out the zombie baby. Ralston decides against raising his dead wife and flees from the cabin into the night while Miz Carnation and the rest of her undead clan look on.
