= Imprint (Masters of Horror) =

Episode of Masters of Horror

- Masters of Horror episode
- DVD cover for "Imprint"
- Episode no.: Season 1 Episode 13
- Directed by: Takashi Miike
- Teleplay by: Daisuke Tengan
- Based on: Bokke e, kyōtē (1999 novella) by Shimako Iwai
- Cinematography by: Toyomichi Kurita
- Production code: 113
- Original air date: 7 April 2006
- Running time: 63 minutes

Guest appearances
- Billy Drago; Youki Kudoh; Michie Itô; Toshie Negishi; Mame Yamada

Episode chronology
← Previous "Haeckel's Tale"	Next → "The Damned Thing"

"Imprint" is the thirteenth episode of the first season of Masters of Horror. Directed by Takashi Miike, the episode was scheduled to premiere on January 27, 2006, but was shelved by Showtime over concerns about its graphic and disturbing content. It was later released to DVD on September 26, 2006.

== Plot ==
Christopher, a Victorian-era American journalist, is traveling through Japan looking for Komomo, a lost girlfriend he had promised to rescue from prostitution and bring to the United States. Landing on an island populated solely by prostitutes and their masters, he is solicited by a syphilitic tout. Christopher has to spend the night, requesting the company of a girl.

Disfigured and disturbed, the girl claims a closer connection with the dead than the living. She tells him that Komomo was here, but hanged herself after her lover never came for her. Distraught, Christopher seeks solace in sake. Falling asleep, he requests a bedtime story. The girl recounts her past — her mother, a midwife, was forced to sell her to a brothel after her father died. Komomo was the most popular girl there, making the others jealous. When the Madam's jade ring was stolen, Komomo was tortured to confess. After suffering hideously — underarms burned, needles driven under fingernails and into gums — she hanged herself in torment, tired of waiting for her lover.

Christopher refuses to believe the story, and pleads for the whole truth. The girl starts again; in the second telling, her family is no longer happy nor loving; her father was an alcoholic, her mother an abortionist. She was taken in by a Buddhist priest, who molested her and inspired an obsession with hell. She beat her father to death for raping her. She gives a new version of Komomo's fate. The disfigured girl stole the jade ring and planted Komomo's hairpin to frame her — and after Komomo was tortured, killed her. She explains that she intended to save Komomo from hell: as Komomo would be doomed for having such an evil friend, only through betrayal could she sever the friendship and ensure Komomo a beautiful afterlife.

Christopher is desperately convinced something has been left out. The woman then reveals a horrifying secret: a tiny second head in the center of a hand hidden beneath her hair — her "Little Sis", a parasitic twin, the woman's identity now partly revealed as that of a Futakuchi-onna, a type of supernatural being. Her mother and father had been brother and sister; "Little Sis" was the fruit of their incest. It was "Little Sis" who commanded her to kill her father, and steal the ring. As the hand begins to talk like Komomo, Christopher is overcome by madness and threatens to shoot her. She informs him that wherever he goes, he will be in hell — a flashback implies that he murdered his own sister as a child. He shoots the girl in the heart and head. Before dying, the girl's body turns into Komomo.

The epilogue finds Christopher in a Japanese prison serving time for the murder of the girl. When he is given a water ration, he hallucinates that the bucket contains an aborted fetus, and cradles the bucket while singing a lullaby, kept company by the ghosts of Komomo and his dead sister.

== Production ==
Japanese director Takashi Miike was among the filmmakers chosen to create an episode for Masters of Horror. Considered to be a "deliberately and spectacularly transgressive director whose work is lionized by a substantial share of the young generation of Internet critics and horror film fans, while routinely rejected as repulsively sadistic by much of the mainstream media", Miike crafted "Imprint" based on the 1999 novella "Bokke e, kyōtē", by Shimako Iwai, who also appears in the episode. He explained the reasons he chose the film: "It had a simplicity that I liked. Also, it had that kind of story I imagined the audience telling their friends after seeing the film. It's a story that could have been told before the horror genre was around — it's more like a kaidan — a traditional scary story."

It included graphic depictions of violence and aborted fetuses, but Miike believed he was staying within the boundaries of acceptability: "I thought that I was right up to the limit of what American television would tolerate. As I was making the film I kept checking to make sure that I wasn't going over the line, but I evidently misestimated."

While the rest of Masters of Horror was produced in Vancouver, British Columbia, "Imprint" was shot and edited entirely in Japan, using Miike's usual crew (only one other Japanese episode was produced, S2E13 "Dream Cruise"). Filming took place at Toei Shoji studios in Tokyo, and on-location in Tochigi and Gunma prefectures. Though the cast was mostly-Japanese, the majority of dialogue was in English.

== Release ==
After previewing the episode, Mick Garris, the series creator and executive producer, requested that it be edited to tone down the content, but, despite some changes being made, Showtime felt it was too disturbing to air on television. The episode, scheduled to air January 27, 2006, was canceled and became the only one of the series to remain unaired in the United States. It was shown, however, at the Yubari International Fantastic Film Festival in Japan on 25 February 2006 and aired in the United Kingdom on the British TV channel Bravo on 7 April 2006. Unlike the other Masters of Horror episodes, the Italian-dubbed version of the film was aired only once in Italy on the Italian TV channel SKY Cinema Max in Summer 2007.

Chiller aired the episode as part of the series re-runs on the channel; however, along with some language and nudity content, Chiller removed some scenes, such as some of Komomo's torture and the depiction of fetuses.

=== Home media ===
The DVD was released on September 26, 2006. It was the thirteenth episode of the first season and the tenth to be released on DVD. The episode appears on the fourth volume of the Blu-ray Disc compilation of the series.
