= Crash & Burn (TV series) =

Canadian television drama series

- Genre: Drama
- Created by: Malcolm MacRury
- Country of origin: Canada
- No. of seasons: 1
- No. of episodes: 13

Production
- Production locations: Hamilton, Ontario, Canada
- Running time: 60 minutes

Original release
- Network: Showcase; Global
- Release: November 18, 2009 – February 18, 2010

Crash & Burn (stylized as Cra$h & Burn) is a Canadian television drama series created by Malcolm MacRury. The show takes place in Hamilton, Ontario, Canada, where it was also filmed.

The series stars Luke Kirby as Jimmy Burn, a claims investigator for Protected Insurance.

== Characters ==
=== Main cast ===
Actor	Character
Luke Kirby	Jimmy Burn
Caroline Cave	Catherine Scott
Leela Savasta	Lucia Silva
Dan Duran	Man from Protected
Steve Bacic	Pavel Korkov
Judah Katz	Dick Dimaio
Paulino Nunes	Gord Papo
Inna Korobkina	Sabrina
Alan C. Peterson	Godjo
Jane Sowerby	Diana Vink
Carlos Diaz	Carlos
Catherine Burdon	Girl From Protected
Ramona Milano	Teresa
Genādijs Dolganovs	Anatole Moskawa
Toby McCallum	Teresa's baby
Elizabeth Hart	Chloe
Clark Johnson	Walker Hearn
Rick Roberts	Jay Pound
