= Jake McDorman =

American actor (born 1986)

- Born: John Allen McDorman IV; July 8, 1986 (age 40); Dallas, Texas, U.S.
- Occupation: Actor
- Years active: 2003–present

John Allen "Jake" McDorman IV (born July 8, 1986) is an American actor best known for the 2014 film American Sniper and starring on television shows such as CBS' Limitless (2015–2016) and the Disney+ historical drama The Right Stuff as Alan Shepard. He is also well known for his roles on the ABC Family comedy-drama Greek (2007–2011), the fourth season of the Showtime comedy-drama Shameless (2014), the revival season of the CBS sitcom Murphy Brown (2018), FX's What We Do in the Shadows (2019), and Peacock's sci-fi comedy drama series Mrs. Davis (2023).

== Early life ==
McDorman was born in Dallas, Texas, the son of Deborah Gale (née Stallings) and John Allen McDorman III. He has a younger sister, Morgan, and an older half-sister, Amanda. McDorman studied acting at the Dallas Young Actors Studio and Nancy Chartier's Film and Acting Studio. He attended Richardson High School, Westwood Junior High and Northwood Hills Elementary in Texas.

== Career ==
McDorman starred in the Fox sitcom Quintuplets from 2004 to 2005, and later guest-starred on House, CSI: Miami and Cold Case. He made his film debut in the 2005 thriller Echoes of Innocence, and later has appeared in Aquamarine, Bring It On: All or Nothing and Live Free or Die Hard. From 2007 to 2011, McDorman starred as Evan Chambers in the ABC Family teen drama series Greek. He also played the lead role in the 2011 Lifetime movie The Craigslist Killer.

In 2012, McDorman played the male lead role opposite Laura Prepon in the short-lived NBC sitcom Are You There, Chelsea?. He later joined the cast of Showtime comedy-drama, Shameless as Mike Pratt. He starred in the film See You in Valhalla opposite Sarah Hyland, and in 2014 co-starred in Clint Eastwood's film American Sniper. Also in 2014, McDorman was cast in the male lead role opposite Lio Tipton in the ABC romantic comedy series, Manhattan Love Story. In 2015, he starred in CBS's Limitless as Brian Finch, a young man who uses a mysterious drug called "NZT" to enhance his intelligence to help the FBI solve cases. The TV series continued the story of the motion picture of the same name. McDorman went on to play Mr. Bruno in the Academy Award nominated film Lady Bird in 2017. Additionally he was seen as Nelson Gardner on the highly acclaimed episode of HBO's Watchmen entitled "This Extraordinary Being". His main role in 2023's Mrs. Davis reunited him with Watchmen creator Damon Lindelof.

== Filmography ==
=== Film ===
Year	Title	Role	Notes
2005	Echoes of Innocence	Dave	
2006	Aquamarine	Raymond	
2006	Bring It On: All or Nothing	Brad Warner	
2007	Live Free or Die Hard	Jim	
2008	Moment	Man	
2010	See You on the Other Side	James	Short film
2014	See You in Valhalla	Magnus Burwood	
2014	American Sniper	Ryan "Biggles" Job	
2015	Always Watching: A Marble Hornets Story	Charlie MacNeel	
2016	Me Him Her	Griffin	
2017	Lady Bird	Mr. Bruno	
2018	Ideal Home	Beau Brumble	
2018	Unlovable	Jesse	
2018	The Escape of Prisoner 614	Thurman Hayford	
2020	Happiest Season	Connor	
2022	Jerry & Marge Go Large	Doug Selbee	
TBA	Spring Bloom	Chef	Post-production

=== Television ===
Year	Title	Role	Notes
2003	Run of the House	Scott Banks	2 episodes
2004–2005	Quintuplets	Parker Chase	Main role, 22 episodes
2006	House	Dan	1 episode
2006	CSI: Miami	Carl Thornton	1 episode
2007	Cold Case	Tanner	1 episode
2007–2011	Greek	Evan Chambers	Main role, 70 episodes
2011	Memphis Beat	Shane Vereen	1 episode
2011	The Craigslist Killer	Philip Markoff	Television film
2012	Are You There, Chelsea?	Rick Miller	Main role, 12 episodes
2012	The Newsroom	Tate Brady	2 episodes
2013–2014	Shameless	Mike Pratt	Recurring role, 10 episodes
2014	Manhattan Love Story	Peter	Main role, 11 episodes
2015–2016	Limitless	Brian Finch	Main role, 22 episodes
2018	Murphy Brown	Avery Brown	Main role, 13 episodes
2019	Watchmen	Nelson Gardner / Captain Metropolis	Episode: "This Extraordinary Being"
2019–2020	What We Do in the Shadows	Jeff Suckler / Gregor	4 episodes
2020	The Right Stuff	Alan Shepard	Main role, 8 episodes
2021	Dopesick	John Brownlee	Miniseries, 8 episodes
2023	Mrs. Davis	Wiley	Main role
2023	Class of '09	Murphy	Main role
