= Shimako Iwai =

Japanese writer (born 1964)

- 岩井 志麻子
- Born: Shimako Takeuchi (竹内 志麻子, Takeuchi Shimako); 5 December 1964 (age 61); Wake, Wake District, Okayama, Japan
- Other names: Momoko Okayama (岡山 桃子, Okayama Momoko)
- Citizenship: Japan
- Occupations: Novelist; tarento
- Years active: 1986–
- Notable work: Bokke e, kyōtē
- Awards: Japan Horror Novel Award (1999); Yamamoto Shūgorō Prize (2000); Women's Public Opinion Literary Award (2002); Shimase Love Literature Award (2002)
- Website: Official website

Shimako Iwai (岩井 志麻子, Iwai Shimako; born 5 December 1964) is a Japanese writer, tarento, and pornographic director. From June 2009 she is represented with Horipro. She serves as a regular commentator in the Tokyo MX series 5-Ji ni Muchū!

== Filmography ==
Year	Title	Network	Notes
	KSB Super J Channel	KSB	Friday guest commentator
	2-Ji Waku'!	KTV	
	Sukuizu!	TV Asahi	
2005	5-Ji ni Muchū!	Tokyo MX	Thursday regular
	Odoru! Sanma Goden!!	NTV	
	Zatsugaku-ō	TV Asahi	
	Ari nashi: AriKen-Golden Stadium	TV Tokyo	
2012	Waratte Iitomo!	Fuji TV	Fridays; "Gyōretsu no mattaku dekinai Jinsei Sōdansho"
2012	Kuroi Hōkoku-sho Onna to Otoko no Jiken File II: Kamen	BS Japan	Episode 3; as Motoko Okaya
2015	Kinkyū kenshō! Monono ke Ōzakettei-sen! Kodomo ni Watch sa setakunai Yōkai-tachi	Family Gekijo	
2015	Mecha-Mecha Iketeru!	Fuji TV	"Nukiuchi Test" participation
	Ariyoshi Hansei-kai	NTV	
2016	Satsujinki	NHK BS Premium	As Umeko Kagawa

== Bibliography ==
As Shimako Takeuchi (novels)

Year	Title
1986	Yumemiru usagi to Police Boy
1987	Sokode, sonomama Koi o shite
1988	Aoi Tsuki no Koibito-tachi
1988	Ningyo-tachi no Komori-uta
1989	Don na Koi ni mo Bijin na atashi
1990	Hito Natsu no Mayoigo-tachi
1992	Seifuku no Maria
1994	Hana Yori Dango
1995	Passion Girls: Super Gals no Junai Battle

As Shimako Takeuchi (essays)

Year	Title
1993	Sora ni Kiss

As Shimako Takeuchi (novels)

Year	Title
1999	Bokke e, kyōtē
2000	Okayama Onna
2001	Yonaki no Mori
2001	Jaakuna Kachōfūgetsu
2002	Marabushi
2002	Jiyū Renai
2002	Gafui shinji yū
2002	Trái Cây
2002	Kurokoge Bijin
2003	Rakuen
2003	Jo Gakkō
2003	Yorokobi no Rukeichi
2003	Usugurai Hanazono
2003	Chijō Shōsetsu
2004	Midarana Batsu
2004	Shi Shōsetsu
2004	Eien no Asa no Kurayami
2004	Kagetsuya Kitan
2004	Deguchi no nai Rakuen
2004	Nise Nise Manshū
2004	Renai Sagi-shi
2005	Shigo Kekkon
2005	Rakuen ni Kokuji shita Otoko
2005	Goze no Nakuie
2006	Beppin ji goku
2006	Mushō no Ai
2006	Kuroi Asa, Shiroi Yoru
2006	Tardonne
2006	Otoko Wars
2007	Kakumawa rete iru Fukai Yume
2007	Jū Nana-sai
2007	Iyana Onna o Kataru Sutekina Kotoba
2007	Hadena Sabaku to Jimina Kyūden
2007	Eien toka Junai toka Zettai toka
2008	Tetsudō Shinjū
2009	Gendai Hyakumonogatari
2009	Gogatsu no Dokubō nite
2009	Yoru no Mangekyō
2009	Ochite yuku
2009	Ugetsu Monogatari
2009	Tsukiyo ni Karasu ga Nakeba
2010	Shiso Chō to Kitchen Garden
2010	Usotsuki Ōkoku no Buta Hime
2010	Gendai Hyaku Monogatari: Uso Mi
2011	Yuna no Kushi: Bizen Furoya Kaidan
2011	Gendai Hyaku Monogatari: Ikiryō
2012	Gendai Hyaku Monogatari: Akumu
2012	Hanryū Futei Onna
2012	Ano Onna
2012	McCulley Pon
2012	Ayashi Katari: Bizen Furoya kaidan
2013	Gendai Hyaku Monogatari: Satsui
2014	Gendai Hyaku Monogatari: Higan
2014	Onna no shiroi ashi
2015	Gendai Hyaku Monogatari: Mōshū
2016	Gendai Hyaku Monogatari: Inga

As Shimako Iwai (essays, dialogues)

Year	Title	Notes
2001	Tokyo no Okayama Hito	
2002	Waidan: Taidan-shū	
2003	Shimako no shibire Fugu Nikki	
2003	Bokke e Renai-dō	
2003	Saigo no Y-dan	Three-way conversation with Usagi Nakamura and Natsuko Mori
2003	Bakushō Mondai no "Bungaku no Susume"	Co-authored with Usagi Nakamura and Otoha
2004	Megami no Yokubō	
2005	Iyana Onna o Kataru Sutekina Kotoba	
2007	Binan no Kuni e	
2007	Jukujo no Tomo	
2008	Hameln no Fuefukime	
2008	Yoku ni Saku Onna, Yoku ni Kareru Onna	
2010	Obasan datte Sex shitai	
2011	Obasan no Hinkaku	
2014	Mumei Toshi e no Tobira	Co-authored with Kei Zushi
2015	"Mashō no Onna" ni Bijo wa inai	
2015	Onna no Kaidan: Jitsuwa-kei Horror Anthology	Co-authored with Kannon Hanabusa and Mariko Kawana

== Videography ==
Title	Notes	Ref.
Phantasma: Noroi no Yakata	Project supervisor	
Imprint: Bokke e, kyōtē	Iwai also appeared	
Siberia Chō Tokkyū 2	Acting debut. Iwai received tremendous impact in the film and said that her "life is divided into 'before Shibe' and 'after Shibe'."	
Jiyū Renai	Iwai also appeared	
Bitch	Iwai also appeared	
Fuan no Tane	Iwai also appeared	
Trái Cây	Original work. Naomi Kawashima played the role of Iwai.	
Hanryū no Yoru	Director. Real intuition of Ittetsu and Maika Asai. First time she served as the director of adult works since 2006, and her second time.	
Junji Inagawa no nemurenai Kaidan	Iwai also appeared	
Utsuru Monogatari: Kadokawa Kaidan Jitsuwa	First of original Gendai Hyaku Monogatari: Mōshū collection "Furikaette wa ikenai"	

== Magazine serials ==
Title
Asia no Zasshi "Yakō-sei no Renshi no Miyako"
