= List of awards and nominations received by Molly Parker =

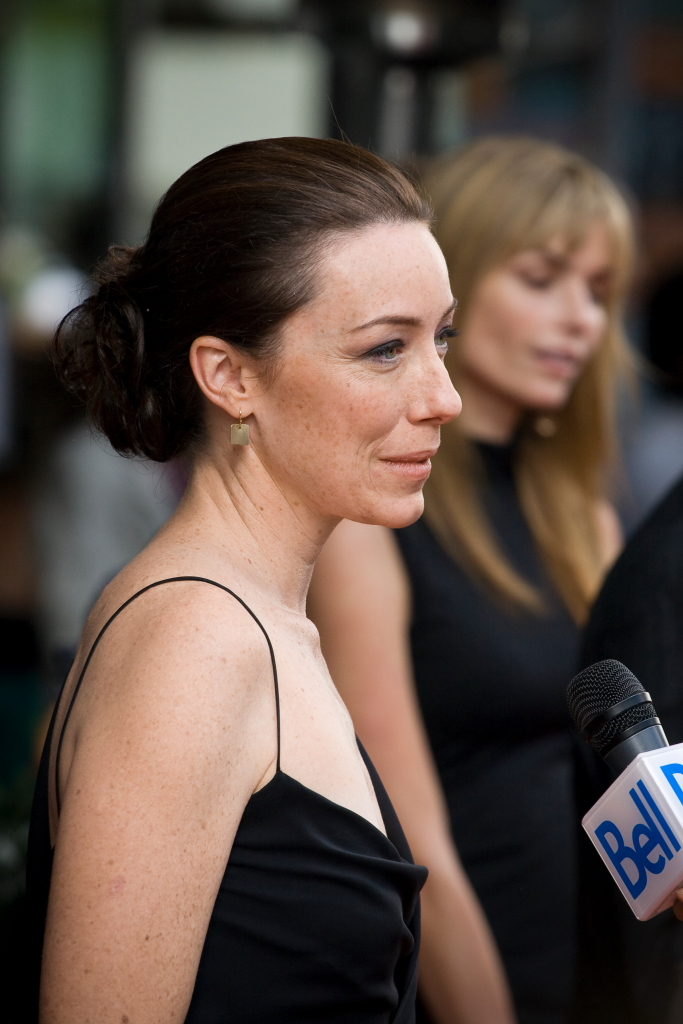
Parker at the 2010 Toronto International Film Festival

Molly Parker is a Canadian actress whose accolades include two Genie Awards, one Leo Award, one Primetime Emmy Award nomination, and three Screen Actors Guild Award nominations.

Parker first gained critical recognition for her performance in the controversial drama Kissed (1996), for which she won the Genie Award for Best Actress. She later gained recognition for her role in the drama The Center of the World (2001), which saw her nominated for the Independent Spirit Award for Best Female Lead. She would subsequently gain critical notice for her portrayal of Alma Garret on the American television series Deadwood, earning a Screen Actors Guild Award for Best Ensemble. Parker was nominated within the same category in 2015 and 2016, respectively, for her work on House of Cards, a role which also saw her nominated for the Primetime Emmy for Outstanding Guest Actress (2016).

== Major industry awards ==
=== Emmy Awards ===
Year	Nominated work	Category	Result	Ref.
2016	Outstanding Guest Actress in a Drama Series	House of Cards	Nominated	

=== Screen Actors Guild Awards ===
Year	Nominated work	Category	Result	Ref.
2006	Best Ensemble in a Drama Series	Deadwood	Nominated	
2014	Best Ensemble in a Drama Series	House of Cards	Nominated	
2015	Best Ensemble in a Drama Series	House of Cards	Nominated	

== Critics awards ==
Year	Award	Category	Nominated work	Result	Ref.
2007	Beverly Hills Film Festival	Best Actress	Who Loves the Sun	Won	
1998	Fancine Fantastic Film Festival of the University of Málaga	Best Actress	Kissed	Won	
2012	Monte-Carlo Television Festival	Outstanding Actress in a Drama Series	The Firm	Nominated	
1997	Taormina International Film Festival	Best Actress	Kissed	Won	
2017	Toronto International Film Festival	Short Cuts Award	Bird	Nominated	
2003	Vancouver Film Critics Circle	Best Supporting Actress	Max	Nominated	
2011	Vancouver Film Critics Circle	Best Actress	Trigger	Nominated	
2016	Vancouver Film Critics Circle	Best Supporting Actress	Weirdos	Won	

== Miscellaneous awards ==
Year	Award	Category	Nominated work	Result	Ref.
2011	ACTRA Awards	Outstanding Performance – Female	Trigger	Nominated	
2002	Canadian Comedy Awards	Best Performance by a Female – Film	Last Wedding	Nominated	
2014	Canadian Screen Awards	Best Guest Performance in a Dramatic Series	Motive	Nominated	
2017	Canadian Screen Awards	Best Supporting Actress	Weirdos	Won	
2014	Chlotrudis Awards	Best Supporting Actress	The Playroom	Nominated	
2019	Chlotrudis Awards	Best Supporting Actress	Madeline's Madeline	Nominated	
1996	Gemini Awards	Best Performance by an Actress in a Leading Role in a Dramatic Program or Mini-Series	Paris or Somewhere	Nominated	
1997	Genie Awards	Best Actress	Kissed	Won	
2002	Genie Awards	Best Supporting Actress	The War Bride	Nominated	
2002	Genie Awards	Best Supporting Actress	Last Wedding	Won	
2003	Genie Awards	Best Actress	Men with Brooms	Nominated	
2004	Genie Awards	Best Actress	Marion Bridge	Nominated	
2008	Genie Awards	Best Actress	Who Loves the Sun	Nominated	
2011	Genie Awards	Best Actress	Trigger	Nominated	
2005	Gotham Awards	Best Ensemble Cast	Nine Lives	Nominated	
2001	Independent Spirit Awards	Best Female Lead	The Center of the World	Nominated	
2001	Leo Awards	Best Actress – Drama	Suspicious River	Nominated	
2014	Leo Awards	Best Supporting Actress – Television Film	Pete's Christmas	Won	
2018	Saturn Awards	Best Actress in a Streaming Presentation	Lost in Space	Nominated	
2005	Women's Image Awards	Actress Drama Series	Deadwood (for "Requiem For a Gleet")	Won	
