= Steven W. Tompkins =

American law enforcement official

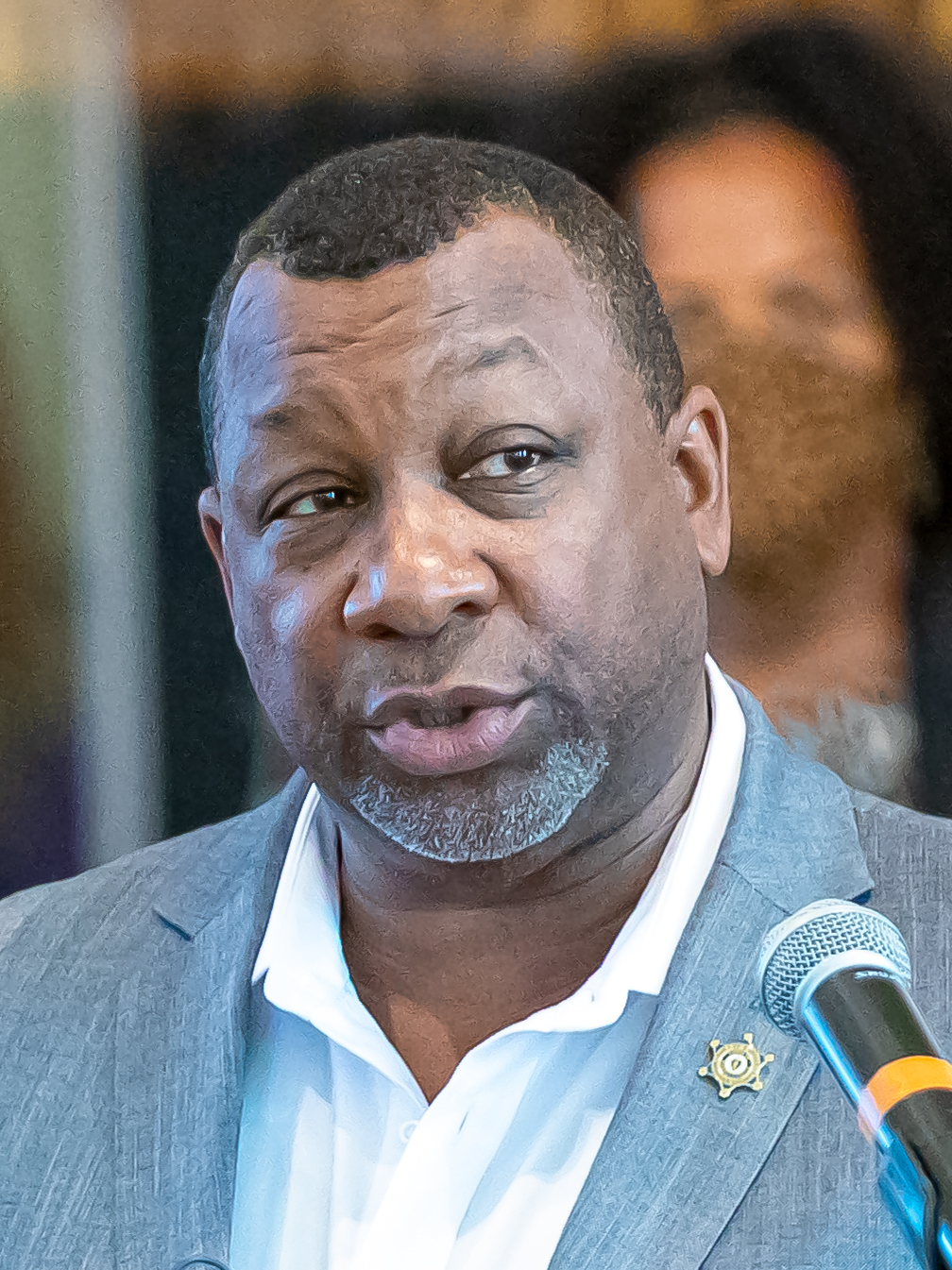
- Tompkins in 2021

Sheriff of Suffolk County
- Incumbent
- Assumed office January 22, 2013
- Appointed by: Deval Patrick
- Preceded by: Andrea Cabral

Personal details
- Party: Democratic
- Education: Boston College, University of Massachusetts
- Occupation: Sheriff of Suffolk County, Massachusetts
- Website: Official website

Steven W. Tompkins is an American law enforcement official who served as the Sheriff of Suffolk County, MA from 2013 through 2025. In August 2025, Tompkins took a leave of absence from his Sheriff position while under indictment for extortion under color of official right.

== Background ==
Tompkins received a bachelor's degree in communications from Boston College and a master's degree in public affairs from the University of Massachusetts Boston. Prior to entering law enforcement, Tompkins was the director of marketing and public affairs at Dimock Community Health Center. Tompkins started working at the Suffolk County Sheriff's Department in 2002 as a chief of external affairs and communications for Sheriff Andrea Cabral. He worked on Elizabeth Warren's 2012 Senate campaign, and also served as a political advisor to her.

== Suffolk County sheriff ==
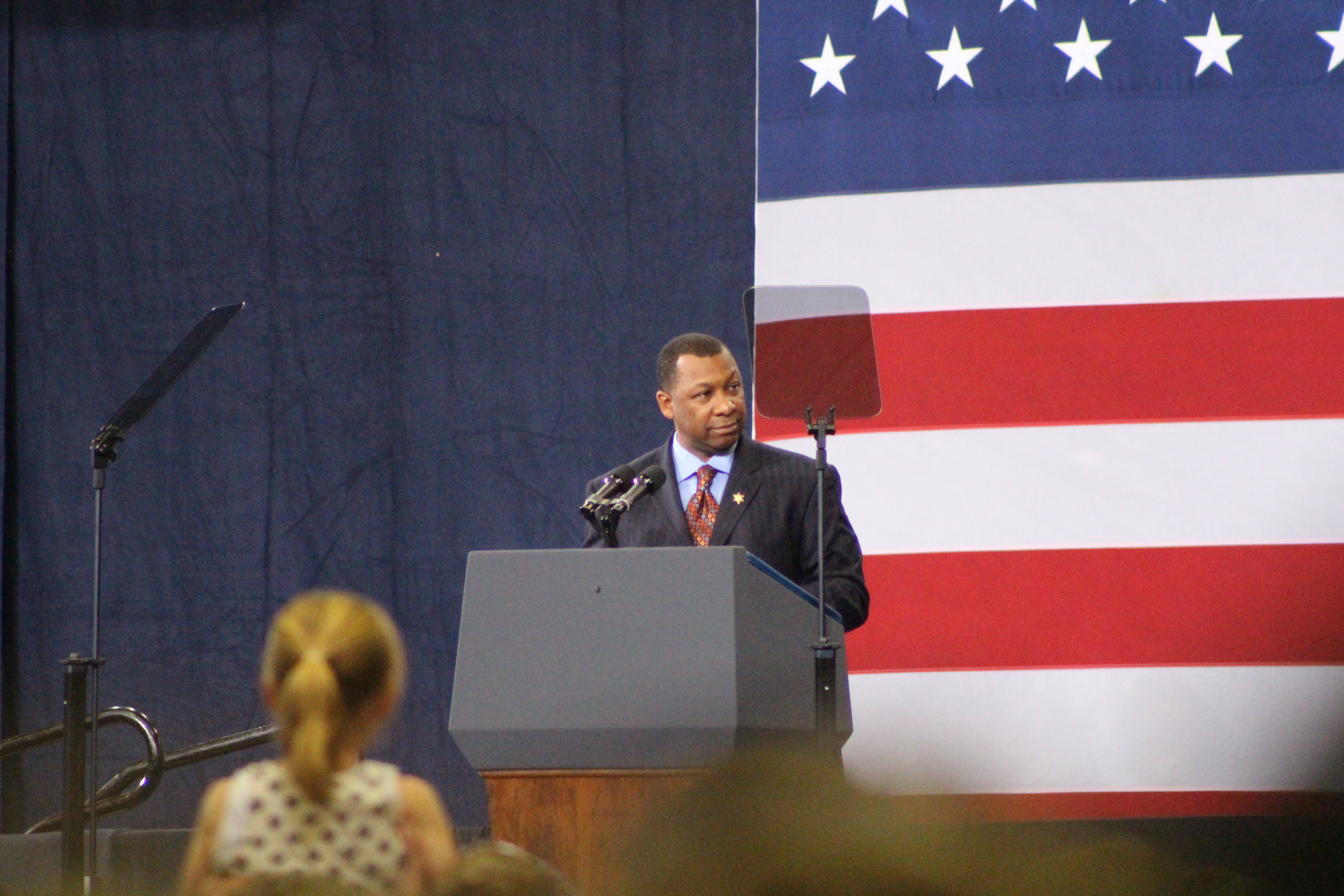
Tompkins speaking in support of Ed Markey's campaign in the 2013 U.S. Senate special election in Massachusetts

Tompkins was appointed sheriff in 2013 by Governor Deval Patrick to replace Andrea Cabral and was subsequently elected to the position in 2014. He was reelected to the position for his first full term in 2016. He received attention as one of several prominent Black officials, along with District Attorney Rachael Rollins and Police Commissioner William G. Gross, in major criminal legal system roles in Boston when their terms overlapped starting in 2019.

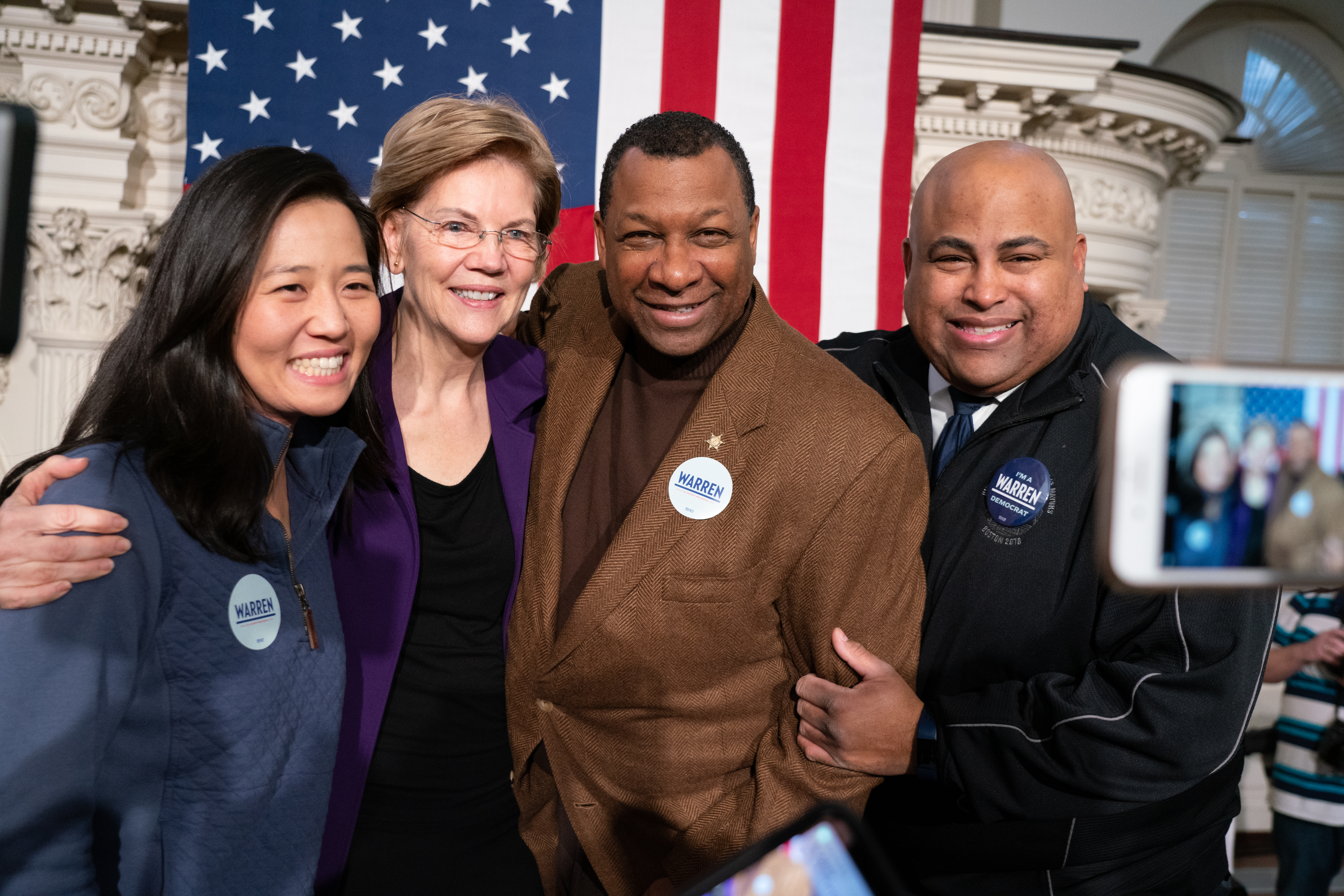
L–R: then-Boston City Councilor Michelle Wu; U.S. Senator Elizabeth Warren; Tomkins; and Lawrence, Massachusetts Mayor Dan Rivera at an event for Warren's 2020 presidential campaign

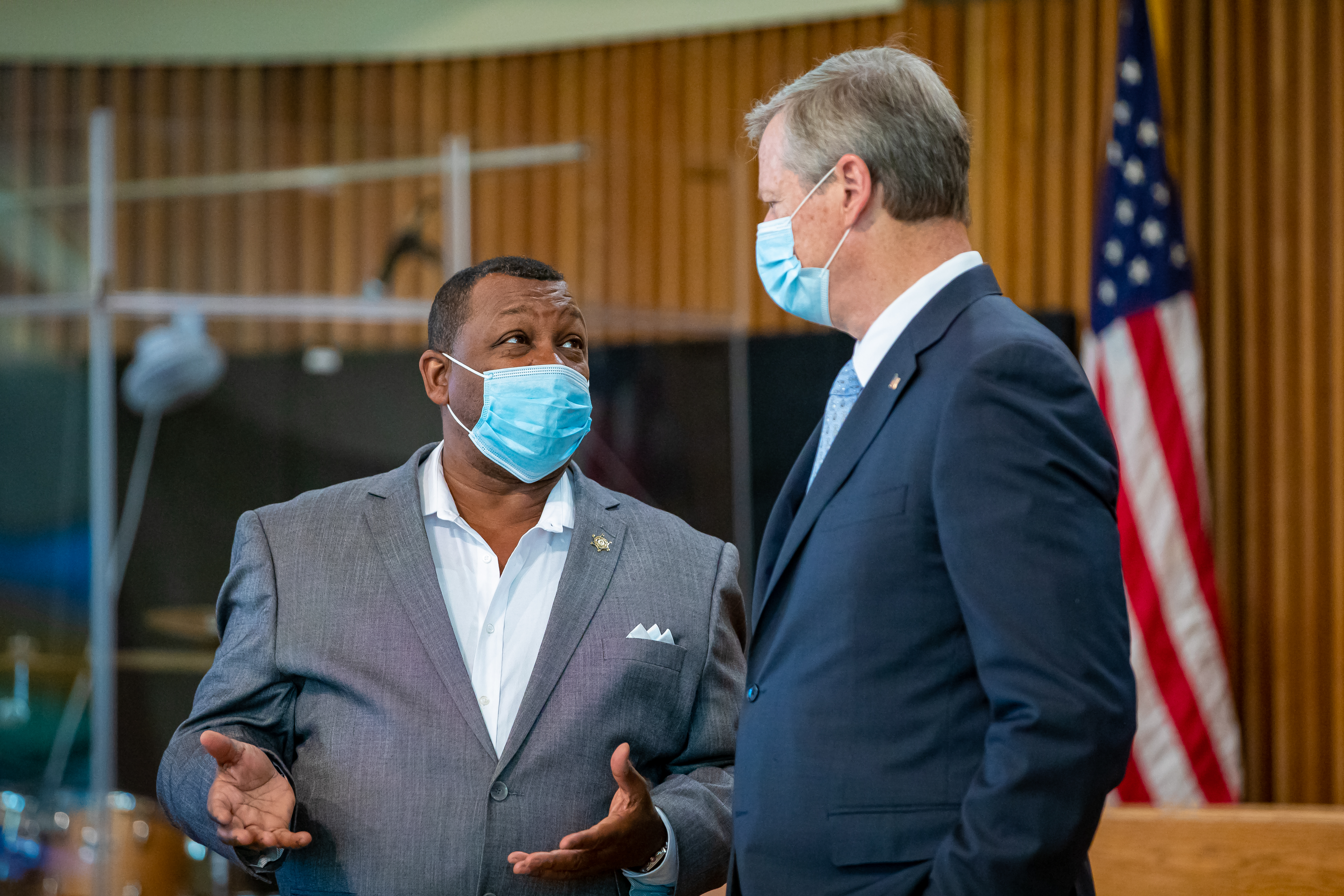
Tompkins speaks with Governor Charlie Baker in 2021

During his tenure Tompkins has been active in state Democratic politics, frequently giving and receiving endorsements for political positions and making unsuccessful run for chair of the Massachusetts Democratic Party. During the 2016 Democratic Party presidential primary, Tompkins endorsed the candidacy of Hillary Clinton. During the 2020 Democratic Party presidential primaries, Tompkins endorsed Elizabeth Warren's candidacy. He spoke at Warren's formal campaign launch.

In September 2015, Tompkins partnered with Boston City Councilor Tito Jackson to host a Boston City Council committee hearing at the South Bay House of Correction. The hearing was focused on soliciting input on strategies to decrease recidivism, and was the first hearing in the history of the Boston City Council to be held in a jail. In 2019 Governor Charlie Baker appointed Tompkins to chair the Roxbury Community College board of trustees. He resigned as chair in August 2025 after being arrested in Florida after what the Boston Globe called "being indicted in federal court in Boston on two counts of extortion under color of official right."

On August 27, 2025, Tompkins took a leave of absence from the Sheriff position at the request of Governor Maura Healey and Attorney General Andrea Campbell.

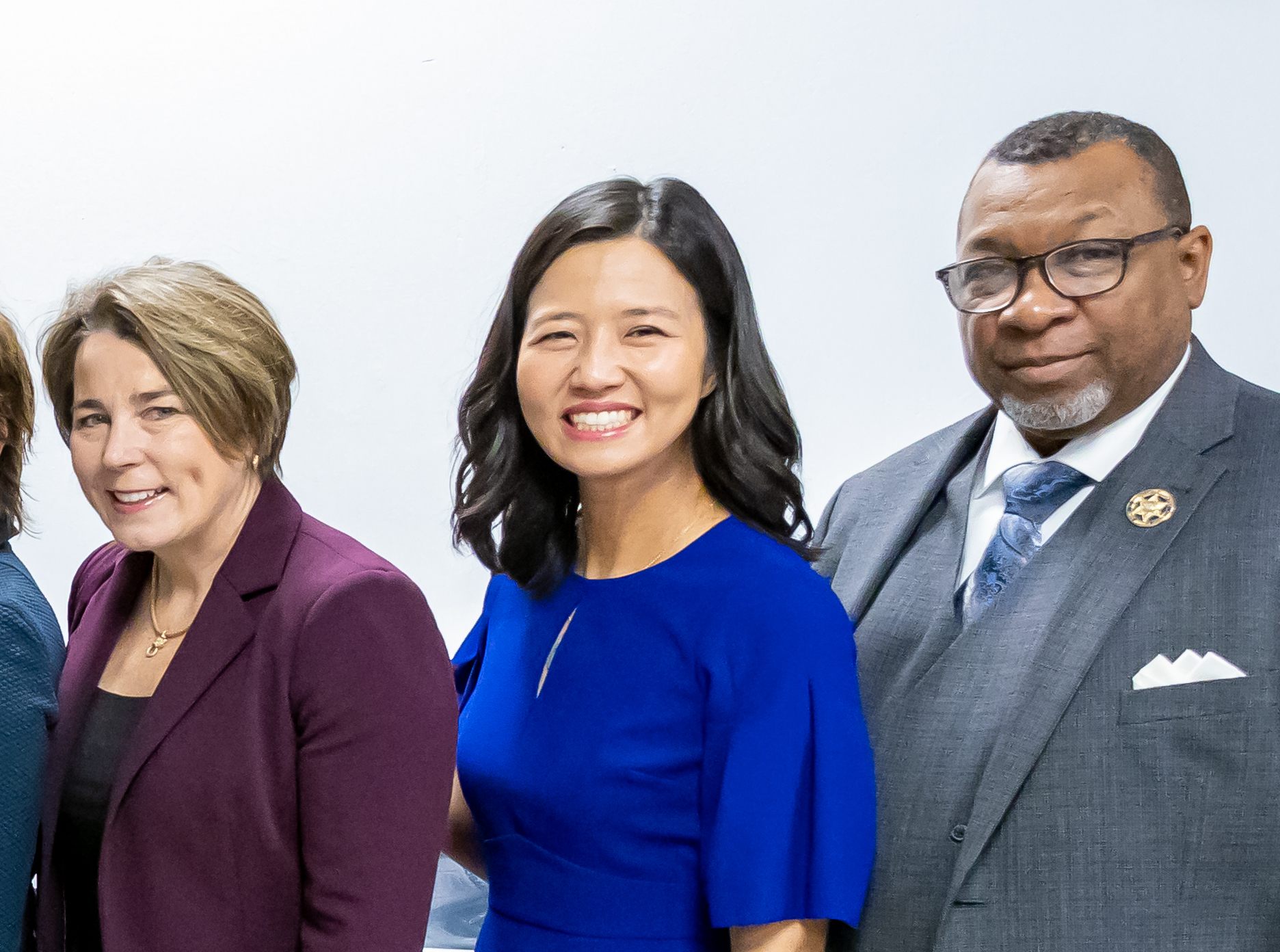
Governor Maura Healey, Boston Mayor Michelle Wu, and Tompkins in 2024

=== ICE contract ===
In 2018 Tompkins oversaw the ending of a contract with Immigration and Customs Enforcement (ICE) which had been active since 2003. At the time the contract ended 182 ICE detainees were incarcerated in Suffolk County facilities and Tompkins began incarcerating women in pretrial detention from Plymouth, Essex, and Norfolk counties in the newly available space in South Bay House of Correction.

=== Deaths in Suffolk County jails ===
Tompkins and the Suffolk County Sheriff's Department has faced pressure from advocates following deaths in Suffolk County jails. In 2021 in particular four deaths in quick succession between July and September of people incarcerated at South Bay House of Correction and Nashua Street Jail sparked protests and calls for transparency and accountability for the circumstances of the deaths. The family of one of these individuals, Ayesha Johnson, would sue the Suffolk County Sheriff's Department in 2024 for allegedly violating Johnson's rights under the U.S. Constitution and Americans with Disabilities Act. According to the suit, Johnson lay dying on the floor of a booking cell for nearly two hours without assistance from any staff while awaiting transportation for court-ordered alcohol use treatment. Following these events another person, Charail Premdas, died while incarcerated for a total of five deaths in Suffolk County jails during 2021. In July 2022, the death of Ashley Emma, another person incarcerated at South Bay House of Correction, sparked further protest.

=== Federal indictment ===
On August 8, 2025, Tompkins was arrested in Florida after being indicted by a federal grant jury for two counts of extortion under color of official right. The indictment alleged Tompkins pressured an executive of a cannabis company to allow him to purchase stock in the company, threatening the company's license renewal by suggesting he would endanger a partnership with the Suffolk County Sheriff's Office that provided formerly incarcerated people with jobs at the company. The Boston Globe reported that the executive Tompkins allegedly extorted was Frank Perullo of Novus Group, a cannabis business consulting firm. In October 2025, Tompkins filed a motion to dismiss the indictment, contending that the alleged extortionate conduct was not unlawful because prosecutors did not allege any illegal quid pro quo arrangement.

== Controversies ==
In 2015, Tompkins paid a $2,500 fine after admitting to using his badge to improperly coerce eight store owners into taking down signs for his political opponents.

In 2021, Tompkins proposed forced treatment of substance use disorders in Suffolk county facilities for unhoused people in Boston, especially those living in the Mass and Cass neighborhood. He faced criticism for this suggestion by advocates who believed forced treatment in the environment of the criminal legal system was inappropriate. In October 2021 Acting Mayor Kim Janey implemented many elements of this plan through an executive order with actual evictions starting in early November. The evictions garnered further controversy with unhoused people being arrested in line for medication and being sent to jail instead of treatment. The ACLU of Massachusetts also filed a class action lawsuit to stop arrests of unhoused people in the area.

In 2023, Tompkins was fined $12,300 fine for breaking state ethics law by creating a paid position for his niece and making his staff do his personal errands. Though he paid the fine, Tompkins stated his niece was qualified for the role in the External Affairs Office as she was a marketing professional and that the employees assisting with childcare were doing him a favor.

== Personal life ==
Tompkins' wife, Suzanne Tompkins, died in 2016 from complications of systemic lupus.

== Electoral history ==
2014 Suffolk County Sheriff Democratic primary
Party	Candidate	Votes	%
Democratic	Steven W. Tompkins (incumbent)	31,125	60.53
Democratic	Douglas Bennett	11,741	22.83
Democratic	Jeremiah F. Goodwin, Sr.	8,339	16.22
Write-in	Other	217	0.42
Total votes		51,422	100

2014 Suffolk County Sheriff election
Party	Candidate	Votes	%
Democratic	Steven W. Tompkins (incumbent)	123,242	82.11
Independent	Hassan A. Smith	26,042	17.35
Write-in	Other	804	0.54
Total votes		150,088	100

2016 Suffolk County Sheriff Democratic primary
Party	Candidate	Votes	%
Democratic	Steven W. Tompkins (incumbent)	24,875	76.51
Democratic	Alexander Rhalimi	7,467	22.97
Write-in	Other	172	0.53
Total votes		32,514	100

2016 Suffolk County Sheriff election
Party	Candidate	Votes	%
Democratic	Steven W. Tompkins (incumbent)	231,807	98.37
Write-in	Other	3,836	0.16
Total votes		235,643	100

2022 Suffolk County Sheriff Democratic primary
Party	Candidate	Votes	%
Democratic	Steven W. Tompkins (incumbent)	43,305	59.2
Democratic	Sandy Zamor-Calixte	29,670	40.5
Write-in	Other	287	0.3
Total votes		73,282	100

2022 Suffolk County Sheriff election
Party	Candidate	Votes	%
Democratic	Steven W. Tompkins (incumbent)	154,205	97.6
Write-in	Other	3,753	2.4
Total votes		157,958	100

== See also ==
- South Bay House of Correction
- Nashua Street Jail
