= Philip Markoff =

American murder suspect (1986–2010)

- Born: February 12, 1986; Sherrill, New York, U.S.
- Died: August 15, 2010 (aged 24); Nashua Street Jail, Boston, Massachusetts, U.S.
- Cause of death: Suicide
- Other name: The Craigslist Killer
- Occupation: Medical student
- Conviction: Trial was set to be scheduled for March 2011, cancelled following Markoff's suicide

Details
- Victims: 3
- Date: April 10 – 16, 2009
- Country: United States
- States: Massachusetts; Rhode Island
- Killed: 1
- Date apprehended: April 20, 2009
- Imprisoned at: Nashua Street Jail, Boston

Philip Markoff (February 12, 1986 – August 15, 2010) was an American medical student who was charged with the armed robbery and murder of Julissa Brisman in a Boston hotel on April 14, 2009, and two other armed robberies. Markoff maintained his innocence of all charges and pleaded not guilty at his arraignment. A grand jury indicted Markoff for first-degree murder, armed robbery, and other charges.

On August 15, 2010, Markoff committed suicide in Boston's Nashua Street Jail, where he was awaiting trial. Markoff was one of several criminals described by media outlets as the "Craigslist Killer", because the killer met his victims through ads placed on the internet site Craigslist. Two of Markoff's victims were offering erotic services on Craigslist.

== Background ==
Philip Markoff was the son of Susan (née Haynes) and Richard Markoff, a dentist in Syracuse, New York. He had an older brother, Jonathan Markoff, and a half-sister (whose father was Susan's second husband, Gary Carroll, a banker). He graduated in 2004 from Vernon-Verona-Sherrill High School, where he was a member of the National Honor Society, the History Club, the Youth Court, and the school bowling and golf teams.

After high school, Markoff attended SUNY Albany where he was a pre-med student. He graduated from SUNY Albany in 2007 and applied for medical schools after taking the MCAT. He was a second-year medical student at Boston University School of Medicine at the time of the crimes. He was suspended from the school after the criminal charges were filed against him.

Markoff met Megan McAllister, a native of New Jersey, in 2005, while they were both volunteers at the Albany Medical Center emergency room. They were engaged to be married, with their wedding planned for August 14, 2009. McAllister was to have begun medical school in the fall of 2009.

== Robberies and murder ==
Markoff was suspected in three robberies, one of which included a murder.

- Trisha Leffler (an escort) was bound, gagged, and robbed at gunpoint on April 10, 2009, at the Westin Copley Place Hotel in Boston.
- Julissa Brisman (who had posted an advertisement online offering massage services) was found dead on April 14, 2009, at the Copley Marriott, also in Boston.
- Cynthia Melton (an exotic dancer offering lap dance services) was the victim of an attempted robbery on April 16, 2009, at a Holiday Inn Express in Warwick, Rhode Island.

Police suspected that the three crimes – close in time and similar in many ways – were committed by the same person. Security camera footage, cell phone activity, and email evidence led police to suspect Markoff in the April 10 and April 14 incidents, and he was arrested on April 20 in Walpole, Massachusetts, while he and his fiancée were en route to Foxwoods Casino in Connecticut.

On April 21, he was arraigned in Brisman's death; the prosecutor stated that a semi-automatic handgun, wrist restraints, and duct tape had been found in Markoff's apartment. Markoff pleaded not guilty to charges of murder, robbery and kidnapping, but was later charged with murder and held without bail. On May 4, Rhode Island officials issued a warrant for Markoff's arrest in the April 16 incident, though the state's Attorney General said that their prosecution would not go forward until the Boston charges were resolved. Markoff's trial was originally expected to begin in July 2010, but was later delayed to March 2011 before Markoff's suicide in prison on August 15, 2010.

While Markoff was called a "monstrous prostitute-predator" by the media, his fiancée initially affirmed her belief in his innocence, calling him "beautiful inside and out". On April 29, she visited Markoff in jail to call off their wedding. On June 11, she visited Markoff a second time and told him she did not plan to see him again for "a long period of time, if ever".

== Suicide ==
Markoff made several suicide attempts while at the Nashua Street Jail; one attempt was made three days after his arrest, an additional attempt after his fiancée broke up with him, and another attempt on the day his wedding was to have taken place. At various times, he was on suicide watch or in the jail's psychiatric unit.

On August 15, 2010, one year and one day after his wedding was to have taken place, Markoff was found dead in his cell. He had used a knife, made from a pen and a piece of metal, to cut arteries in his ankles, legs, and neck. He had also swallowed toilet paper and tightened a plastic bag over his head with gauze. Additionally, he had written his former fiancée's name and their pet names for each other in blood on the cell wall, and photographs of the two of them were scattered about.

== Media adaptations ==
- Seven Days of Rage, the Deadly Crime Spree of the Craigslist Killer by Paul La Rosa, was published in 2009 by Simon & Schuster.
- The April 25, 2009 episode of the CBS News television series 48 Hours Mystery, titled "Craigslist: Classified for Murder", was devoted to the case.
- A Date with Death: The Secret Life of the Accused "Craigslist Killer" written by Michele McPhee, was published by St. Martin's True Crime Library on May 25, 2010.
- A television movie, The Craigslist Killer, which premiered on Lifetime Network on January 3, 2011, is based on McPhee's book.
- The Season 3 premiere of Murder Made Me Famous, which aired on April 8, 2017, chronicled the case.
- The second episode of Season 5 (2019) of the Investigation Discovery show See No Evil covered Julissa Brisman's murder and the search for her killer.
