= Nashua Street Jail =

Jail in Boston, Massachusetts

- Interactive map of Nashua Street Jail
- Location: Boston, Massachusetts; 42°22′1.80″N 71°3′58.35″W
- Status: Operational
- Capacity: 700
- Opened: 1990
- Managed by: Suffolk County Sheriff's Department
- Director: Steven W. Tompkins

The Nashua Street Jail, also known as the Suffolk County Jail, is a jail located in Boston, Massachusetts. It opened on Memorial Day in 1990 as a replacement for the overcrowded Charles Street Jail, located half a mile to the southwest. This facility houses almost 744 pre-trial detainees in 13 different housing units. The jail has 453 cells containing 654 individual beds. The entire facility is maximum security. On August 15, 2010, Philip Markoff, the so-called "Craigslist Killer", committed suicide while in detention there.
