= Hurstbourne Acres, Kentucky =

- City
- Location of Hurstbourne Acres in Jefferson County, Kentucky

- Location within the state of Kentucky Hurstbourne Acres (the United States)
- Coordinates: 38°13′13″N 85°35′26″W
- Country: United States
- State: Kentucky
- County: Jefferson
- Incorporated: 1963
- Named for: a neighboring community

Area
  - Total: 0.35 sq mi (0.90 km^{2})
  - Land: 0.35 sq mi (0.90 km^{2})
  - Water: 0 sq mi (0.00 km^{2})
- Elevation: 659 ft (201 m)

Population (2020)
  - Total: 1,957
  - Density: 5,656.5/sq mi (2,183.97/km^{2})
- Time zone: UTC-5 (Eastern (EST))
  - Summer (DST): UTC-4 (EDT)
- ZIP Code: 40220
- FIPS code: 21-38818
- GNIS feature ID: 2404749
- Website: www.hurstbourneacresky.gov

Hurstbourne Acres is a home rule-class city in Jefferson County, Kentucky, United States. As of the 2020 census, Hurstbourne Acres had a population of 1,957.

== Geography ==
Hurstbourne Acres is located in east-central Jefferson County. It is bordered to the southeast by Forest Hills, to the east and south by Jeffersontown, and to the north and west by the Louisville/Jefferson County consolidated government. Interstate 64 passes just north of the city, with access from Exit 15 (Hurstbourne Parkway). Downtown Louisville is 10 miles (16 km) to the west.

According to the United States Census Bureau, Hurstbourne Acres has a total area of 0.35 square miles (0.90 km^{2}), all land.

== Demographics ==
Historical population
Census	Pop.	Note	%±
1970	289		—
1980	386		33.6%
1990	1,072		177.7%
2000	1,504		40.3%
2010	1,811		20.4%
2020	1,957		8.1%
U.S. Decennial Census

=== 2020 census ===
As of the 2020 census, Hurstbourne Acres had a population of 1,957. The median age was 32.2 years. 18.5% of residents were under the age of 18 and 10.0% of residents were 65 years of age or older. For every 100 females there were 102.4 males, and for every 100 females age 18 and over there were 103.6 males age 18 and over.

100.0% of residents lived in urban areas, while 0.0% lived in rural areas.

There were 981 households in Hurstbourne Acres, of which 27.6% had children under the age of 18 living in them. Of all households, 35.8% were married-couple households, 28.6% were households with a male householder and no spouse or partner present, and 27.0% were households with a female householder and no spouse or partner present. About 39.7% of all households were made up of individuals and 8.0% had someone living alone who was 65 years of age or older.

There were 1,056 housing units, of which 7.1% were vacant. The homeowner vacancy rate was 0.0% and the rental vacancy rate was 6.8%.

Racial composition as of the 2020 census
Race	Number	Percent
White	859	43.9%
Black or African American	211	10.8%
American Indian and Alaska Native	5	0.3%
Asian	743	38.0%
Native Hawaiian and Other Pacific Islander	0	0.0%
Some other race	30	1.5%
Two or more races	109	5.6%
Hispanic or Latino (of any race)	100	5.1%

=== 2000 census ===
As of the census of 2000, there were 1,504 people, 909 households, and 309 families residing in the city. The population density was 4,623.6 inhabitants per square mile (1,785.2/km^{2}). There were 1,071 housing units at an average density of 3,292.4 per square mile (1,271.2/km^{2}). The racial makeup of the city was 80.78% White, 8.44% African American, 0.33% Native American, 7.45% Asian, 1.00% from other races, and 1.99% from two or more races. Hispanic or Latino of any race were 2.86% of the population.

There were 909 households, out of which 11.6% had children under the age of 18 living with them, 25.9% were married couples living together, 5.8% had a female householder with no husband present, and 66.0% were non-families. 54.8% of all households were made up of individuals, and 6.4% had someone living alone who was 65 years of age or older. The average household size was 1.65 and the average family size was 2.49.

In the city, the population was spread out, with 11.6% under the age of 18, 18.0% from 18 to 24, 43.2% from 25 to 44, 16.4% from 45 to 64, and 11.0% who were 65 years of age or older. The median age was 31 years. For every 100 females, there were 99.7 males. For every 100 females age 18 and over, there were 99.4 males.

The median income for a household in the city was $39,211, and the median income for a family was $58,125. Males had a median income of $38,558 versus $30,184 for females. The per capita income for the city was $27,238. About 2.0% of families and 5.8% of the population were below the poverty line, including 3.6% of those under age 18 and none of those age 65 or over.
