= South Bay House of Correction =

Jail in Suffolk County, Massachusetts

- Interactive map of South Bay House of Correction
- Location: Boston, Massachusetts; 42°20′3.16″N 71°4′5.39″W
- Status: Operational
- Opened: 26 December 1991
- Managed by: Suffolk County Sheriff's Department
- Director: Steven W. Tompkins

The South Bay House of Correction is a Suffolk County jail. It was opened in 1991, replacing an earlier structure from the 1880s.
