= The Playroom (film) =

- Directed by: Julia Dyer
- Written by: Gretchen Dyer
- Starring: John Hawkes; Molly Parker; Olivia Harris; Cody Linley
- Cinematography: Russell Blair
- Edited by: Michael Coleman
- Music by: Bruce Richardson
- Production companies: One Mind Productions; Circle of Confusion; Ten96 Films
- Distributed by: Freestyle Releasing
- Release dates: April 21, 2012 (Tribeca Film Festival); April 5, 2013
- Running time: 83 minutes
- Country: United States
- Language: English
- Box office: $5,964

The Playroom is a 2012 American drama film directed by Julia Dyer. It has a 50% on Rotten Tomatoes based on 12 reviews.

== Cast ==
- John Hawkes as Martin Cantwell - Father
- Molly Parker as Donna Cantwell - Mother
- Olivia Harris as Maggie Cantwell - Teen daughter
- Jonathan McClendon as Christian - Son
- Alexandra Doke as Janie - Daughter
- Ian Veteto as Sam
- Lydia Mackay as Nadia Knotts
- Jonathan Brooks as Clark Knotts
- Cody Linley as Ryan
