= Michele McPhee =

American journalist (born 1970)

- Born: 1970 (age 55–56)
- Education: University of Massachusetts, Boston (B.A., English, 1993)
- Occupations: Author; journalist; radio personality
- Parent(s): Bruce A. McPhee; Sheila P. (Seward) McPhee
- Website: michelemcphee.com

Michele R. McPhee (born April 8, 1970) is an American author, talk radio host, and five-time Emmy nominated investigative journalist from Boston. McPhee also worked as columnist and correspondent to the Boston Herald, was the New England reporter for ABC News, and was a general assignment reporter with the television station WCVB. She now lives in Los Angeles writing screenplays, most recently for Showtime's City on a Hill, and has a HBO series in development based on her Newsweek cover story.

McPhee began her journalism career with The Boston Globe in 1993. In 1996, she transferred to the New York Daily News and became the chief of the newspaper police bureau in 2002. In 2004, McPhee became a columnist with the Boston Herald. McPhee began her radio career with an evening talk show on WTKK in 2007. In 2010, McPhee began hosting her own afternoon talk show on WRKO and started guest hosting The Howie Carr Show on WRKO.

In June 2015, she began hosting a three-hour mid-afternoon radio show on WMEX AM in Boston. Her radio show ended in 2017 when the WMEX radio station stopped broadcasting.

== Career ==
She is half Italian American. She graduated from Wakefield High School in Wakefield, Massachusetts 1988 and the University of Massachusetts, Boston in 1993.

In September 1993, McPhee became a contributing reporter to The Boston Globe. By July 1995, McPhee became a correspondent with the Globe. In December 1996, McPhee joined the New York Daily News, writing her first article for the newspaper for the Christmas Eve edition, "No Bail For Alleged Gotti Heir".

In 2002, McPhee was named the first female police bureau chief for the New York Daily News. She won the 2002 New York Society of the Silurians' Feature News Award for an article titled "The Days After" about the September 11, 2001 attack. In response to a story she wrote about police suspicions of a local judge, McPhee received death threats through an anonymously written letter in January 2003. In her capacity as bureau chief, McPhee also appeared in other media for expertise on New York City police issues. In 2003, McPhee participated in a debate about the police shooting of Amadou Diallo alongside attorney Anthony H. Gair on the NPR program The Tavis Smiley Show, guest hosted that day by Tony Cox. In 2004, McPhee appeared on the Fox News Channel program The O'Reilly Factor to discuss an issue with a local September 11 charity.

McPhee returned to Boston in 2004 and became a weekly columnist and police bureau chief for the Boston Herald until late 2007. She continued writing a weekly column for the paper and also freelanced news stories.

From December 2007 to November 2010, McPhee hosted an evening talk show on WTKK. Her contract was not renewed, because of creative differences, and was immediately pulled from the air.

On January 13, 2011, McPhee joined WRKO as its 1 to 3 p.m. radio host of The Michele McPhee Show. She left WRKO after a seven-month stay, but returned to the station on June 11, 2012 to occupy a new four-hour midday slot on the station's schedule.

In August 2011, McPhee was hired as a general assignment reporter for WCVB Channel 5 in Boston. News producer Andrew Vrees, in a news release, described McPhee as "an aggressive and well-connected journalist ... whose track record speaks for itself."

McPhee was a story consultant for the Lifetime made-for-TV movie based on the Clark Rockefeller case that aired in March 2010.

In June 2015, McPhee pleaded not guilty to charges of operating a motor vehicle while under the influence of alcohol, resisting arrest and assault and battery on a police officer. She was arrested on Interstate 93 in the Dorchester neighborhood of Boston, after being observed driving her Mercedes erratically by a Massachusetts State Trooper. On January 29, 2016, McPhee's lawyer claimed the state trooper had assaulted her and that she was hurt worse in the altercation.

On April 17, 2017, two days before Aaron Hernandez killed himself, McPhee went onto a WEEI-FM, Boston, sports radio show, The Kirk and Callahan Show, hosted by Kirk Minihane and Gerry Callahan. Discussion on this show included the "rumor" (as described by the hosts of the show) that Aaron Hernandez was homosexual. She, together with the hosts of the show, used football metaphors to suggest he was sexually attracted to men, and "jokingly riffed" on this theme in a manner reported by the New Yorker as "cringe-inducing". McPhee has argued that this was not an "outing", and that focus on Hernandez's sexuality in her investigations, and her later reporting after his death, was to explore motives for the murder of Odin Lloyd. Other media outlets were reportedly aware of rumors regarding Hernandez's sexuality but did not report on them, either because they did not consider them relevant to coverage of his career, arrest, trial, conviction, or death, or could not confirm their veracity. Two days after Hernandez's death, McPhee wrote a piece in Newsweek which covered, along with other aspects of his history, an “intimate relationship” he reportedly had with a male friend from high school. Input, or comments on these claims from Hernandez’s family members or associates, were not included in the Newsweek report.

== Books ==
- Mob Over Miami, 2002, ISBN 978-0451409652
- Absolute Evil, 2008, ISBN 978-1844547234
- Heartless: The True Story of Neil Entwistle and the Cold Blooded Murder of his Wife and Child, 2008, ISBN 978-0312947767
- When Evil Rules: Vengeance and Murder on Cape Cod, 2009, ISBN 978-1250037671
- A Date with Death: The Secret Life of the Accused "Craigslist Killer", 2010, ISBN 978-0312945060
- A Mob Story, 2010, ISBN 0312942672
- A Professor's Rage: The Chilling True Story of Harvard PhD Amy Bishop, her Brother's Mysterious Death, and the Shooting Spree that Shocked the Nation, 2011, ISBN 978-0312535292
- Maximum Harm: The Tsarnaev Brothers, the FBI, and the Road to the Marathon Bombing, 2017, ISBN 978-1611688498

McPhee has written several best-selling true crime books, including Mob Over Miami, Heartless: The True Story of Neil Entwistle and the Brutal Murder of His Wife and Baby, When Evil Rules, A Date With Death: The True Story of the Craigslist Killer, and A Mob Story.

In 2008, the news magazines Dateline NBC and Primetime Live interviewed McPhee for their stories about Neil Entwistle.

Mob Over Miami was set to become a feature film titled "UnMade Man." In January 2011, Lifetime aired a television movie based on A Date With Death, starring William Baldwin.

She contributed to the anthology, Masters of True Crime (Prometheus Books 2012).
