= List of killings by law enforcement officers in the United States, October 2010 =

This is a list of people reported killed by non-military law enforcement officers in the United States in October 2010, whether in the line of duty or not, and regardless of reason or method. The listing documents the occurrence of a death, making no implications regarding wrongdoing or justification on the part of the person killed or officer involved. Killings are arranged by date of the incident that caused death. Different death dates, if known, are noted in the description. The table below lists 32 people.

== October 2010 ==
Date	Name (Age) of Deceased	State (city)	Description
2010-10-31	Nicodemus Sullivan (24)	California (Sonoma County)	Sullivan was shot and killed by four Sonoma County Sheriff's deputies and a California Highway Patrol officer after he showed up at his mother's house in unincorporated Sonoma County, near Santa Rosa. Police came to the neighborhood where Sullivan was in his car, and Sullivan accelerated towards the patrol cars, striking one car with a deputy inside. Police also feared Sullivan was reaching for a weapon while attempting to ram their vehicles. Sullivan was hit 11 times.
2010-10-30	Kenneth Wickham (63)	Washington (Tacoma)	Shot after refusing to stop waving gun after numerous police orders to do so. Police were responding to a report that Wickham was threatening to kill himself.
2010-10-29	Henry Dang (15)	Connecticut (Windsor Locks)	Off duty Officer Michael Koistinen, who had been drinking alcoholic beverages for hours, struck 15-year-old Henry Dang with his car while the teen was riding his bicycle home from a friend's house at night. Koistinen was driving more than 70 mph in a 35 mph zone when he hit Dang, police said. Police believe Koistinen was drunk at the time. Koistinen's father, Sargeant Robert Koistinen, who was the highest-ranking Windsor Locks police officer to initially respond to the accident, removed his son from the accident scene, placed him in the back of the department's SUV, and drove him back and forth to the police station several times. Sargeant Koistinen prevented officers from the regional accident reconstruction team from performing a blood/alcohol test on Michael Koistinen.
2010-10-29	Tobias Arthur Mackey (25)	Texas (Dallas)	Tate claimed he shot Mackey because he thought he was reaching for a gun. A Dallas County grand jury cleared Tate last year of any wrongdoing. ... The suit claims that after being shot, Mackey said: "Why did you shoot me? I don’t have anything." Tate then shot him again, at close range, the suit alleges. He was shot a total of nine times, according to the lawsuit.
2010-10-29	Samuel Thomas Cunningham III (53)	Georgia (Athens)	Shot while holding knife to another man's throat. Police officer on foot patrol heard an argument and entered apartment.
2010-10-28	James Lamont (36)	Vermont (Rutland)	
2010-10-27	Michael Nunn (40)	Indiana (Gary)	The officers ordered Nunn to drop his knife, and he charged at them, Roberts said. At least one officer shot Nunn.
2010-10-26	Acrifa Soman (21)	Florida (Orlando)	
2010-10-26	William Lee Kelly (40)	Washington (Longview)	Shot after shooting at police. Officers were pursuing man as prime suspect following the armed robbery of a market. After man's vehicle's tire blew out, man exited vehicle with rifle and fired at police.
2010-10-26	Douglas Ostling (43)	Washington (Bainbridge Island)	Bled to death after being shot in leg through door. Officers were responding to a 911 call from Ostling in a reported state of "excited delirium." Ostling opened the door to officers while holding an ax, then retreated and closed door. Ostling was left unattended for 75 minutes after being shot.
2010-10-24	Nelson Gray Hyman (22)	South Carolina (Summerville)	Coroner Chris Nesbit says Hyman tried to run over the cop with his truck. Hyman was then shot in the upper torso and crashed his truck and as a result he died on the scene.
2010-10-24	Quentin Dodd (50)	Washington (Spokane)	Shot after charging at deputies with obsidian knife in hand and after yelling "Shoot me." at officers. Officers were responding to report that Dodd was threatening roommate with knife.
2010-10-24	unnamed man	Georgia (DeKalb County)	Shot after engaging in a criminal act. Two off-duty police officers work security at an apartment complex "approached the suspect and at some point were forced to shoot."
2010-10-23	Thomas Steidley (52)	Florida (Winter Haven)	
2010-10-23	Larry Brown (58)	Colorado (Delta)	Shot after shooting at police. Officers were responding to report of gunshots in neighborhood.
2010-10-22	Marques Ra'Shawn Burnett (28)	North Carolina (Greensboro)	Burnett was shot by Cpl. M.W. Chandler while officers were responding to a disturbance call. A 911 call reported a man outside yelling that he was going to kill someone. Burnett knocked Officer Gillis unconscious and Officer Chandler shot Burnett, who died at the scene. It is unclear whether Burnett had a weapon or was under the influence of drugs or alcohol during the incident. Witnesses to the shooting disputed that a Taser was used in the incident, but saw Burnett knock the female officer unconscious.
2010-10-22	James Ramirez (33)	California (Santa Monica)	Authorities, responding to a shooting call, found a female who told authorities her husband (James Ramirez) had shot her. According to the investigation, after the shooting Ramirez fled on foot with a handgun. As he was fleeing he approached officers, who ordered him to stop. He refused to do so, and instead pointed his gun at the officers, at which point the officer-involved shooting occurred.
2010-10-19	Daniel Gonzales (56)	New Mexico (Albuquerque)	After trying to negotiate with Gonzales by phone for more than an hour and a half, Gonzales stood at the front door with shotguns in both hands at about 10:30 p.m. and threatened police, Garcia said. An Albuquerque SWAT team member or members fired at Gonzales, killing him.
2010-10-17	Danroy Thomas Henry Jr. (20)	New York (Thornwood)	Henry was shot three times and killed by police in the midst of a brawl outside Finnegan's Grill in the shopping center after striking an officer with his car. The father of a passenger in the car said that the driver headed away because he thought police wanted him to move. Roughly six months later, the head of the New York police union, presented Aaron Hess, the officer who shot and killed Danroy "DJ" Henry, with an "officer of the year" award.
2010-10-10	Jonathan Cuevas (20)	California (Los Angeles)	A lone deputy approached three men. One of the men, later identified as Johnathan Cuevas, allegedly reached into his waistband as he started to run. Seeing this, the deputy fired several times, striking Cuevas, said a Los Angeles County Sheriff's Deputy. A handgun was recovered at the scene, the deputy said.
2010-10-08	Albert James Voute, III (36)	Connecticut (Danbury)	State police stopped the car that Voute was driving on eastbound I-84 about 6:20 p.m. Friday near Exit 4, and he fled on foot. Voute had a handgun that he "directed at" a state trooper, who responded by shooting Voute, according to state police. Voute later died from the gunshot wound.
2010-10-07	Rashaad Brookins (23)	Pennsylvania (Pittsburgh)	Pittsburgh police were called to a social club just after 1 a.m. for a reported burglary. Officers found the front door forced open; an officer went in and encountered a man, later identified as Mr. Brookins, and ordered him to show his hands. Police said Mr. Brookins refused and then "lurched" at the officer. An assisting officer yelled "knife!" as Mr. Brookins was about to attack, police said, and the first officer fired in self-defense.
2010-10-07	James Davis (18)	California (Los Angeles)	LAPD officers patrolling the housing projects encountered a group of males, one of whom ran away, police said. The officers chased the suspect, later identified as James Davis. According to LAPD, Davis pointed a gun at the officers, prompting at least one officer to fire a weapon. Police said a weapon was recovered from the shooting scene near 114th and Grape streets.
2010-10-07	Patrick Johnson (19)	Pennsylvania (Philadelphia)	When officers arrived, Johnson confronted them with a stick and at one point tried to set it on fire. They say that officers trained in crisis-intervention were called to the scene but that Johnson failed to respond to repeated verbal requests to calm down, and that a Taser gun had to be used to subdue him.
2010-10-15	Christopher "Scott" Kilgore (33)	Florida (Jacksonville)	
2010-10-06	Douglas Watson (59)	Arizona (Mesa)	
2010-10-05	Danny Rodriguez (28)	Arizona (Phoenix)	Rodriguez and his pit bull were shot and killed by officer Richard Chrisman after reports of a domestic disturbance at their home. Chrisman claimed that Rodriguez tried to attack him with a bicycle. According to prosecutors, Chrisman killed Rodriguez without a possibility of a threat. Chrisman was charged with second-degree murder and animal cruelty, and was convicted of the lesser charge of manslaughter and assault. He was sentenced to seven years of prison in 2013.
2010-10-05	Rod Fiorini (23)	California (Fresno)	After drinking an alcoholic energy drink, college student Fiorini went into his backyard and fired a shotgun. His roommate called police. Police say when they arrived and found Fiorini sitting on the porch holding the shotgun they ordered him to drop his weapon. They say he did not comply moved toward them. Fearing for their safety the eight officers fired sixty-three shots. Fiorini died at the scene.
2010-10-04	Reginald Linthicum (43)	California (Los Angeles)	Officers responded to a robbery call at a flower store, where shots were reportedly fired and a man told officers he was wounded. While there, officers got a report that a similar man had robbed the Radio Shack. A suspect fitting the description was seen and a pursuit ensued. The chase concluded when Linthicum abandoned his vehicle and made an effort to carjack another. Authorities said the officer-involved shooting occurred at that point.
2010-10-03	Dougles Wnek (37)	New Jersey (Middle Township)	Wnek was fatally shot by members of the Cape May County Regional SWAT team after Wnek allegedly threatened police with firearms and failed to comply with orders to drop his weapons during a standoff at his residence.
2010-10-03	Emmanuel Paulino (24)	New York (New York City)	A man who called 911 and ranted about killing police was shot and killed in Inwood as he waved a knife at officers Sunday.
2010-10-01	Letha Adams (38)	Oklahoma (Muskogee)	Adams tried to take [the officer's] weapon. Police said the two then got into a scuffle. "She was just swinging and she was on top of him and going crazy," said [a Muskogee resident]. Police said a second officer, identified as Ginny Bemo, arrived and quickly went to her partner's aid, firing shots at Adams.

== See also ==
- Death in custody § United States
- Henry A. Wallace Police Crime Public Database
- List of cases of police brutality
- List of countries with annual rates and counts for killings by law enforcement officers
- List of law enforcement officers killed in the line of duty in the United States
- List of law enforcement officers convicted for an on-duty killing in the United States
- List of shootings by US immigration agents
- List of police reforms related to the George Floyd protests
- List of unarmed African Americans killed by law enforcement officers in the United States
- Lists of killings by law enforcement officers
- Police brutality in the United States
- Police misconduct § United States
- Police riot § United States
- Police use of deadly force in the United States
