= Monica Bharel =

American medical doctor and Public Health educator

Massachusetts Department of Public Health

Commissioner
- In office February 2015 – June 18, 2021
- Governor: Charlie Baker
- Preceded by: Cheryl Bartlett, R.N
- Succeeded by: Margret Cooke

Monica Bharel is a medical educator who has served on the faculties of Harvard Medical School, Boston University Medical School, and Harvard School of Public Health. She is also a member of the Harvard Board of Overseers, serving as its vice-chair for 2025-2026. Bharel is the global clinical lead for public sector and public health at Google for Health, and is a former commissioner of the Massachusetts Department of Public Health and a former chief medical officer of the Boston Health Care for the Homeless Program.

== Education ==
She earned her medical degree from Boston University School of Medicine in 1994, and completed her residency in internal medicine at Boston City Hospital (later merged into Boston Medical Center). She received her master of public health degree through the Commonwealth Fund's Harvard University Fellowship in Minority Health Policy.

== Career ==
She practiced general internal medicine at Massachusetts General Hospital, Boston Medical Center and the Veterans Administration. She taught at Harvard Medical School, Boston University School of Medicine, and Harvard School of Public Health.

She served as the chief medical officer of Boston Health Care for the Homeless.

Bharel was appointed commissioner of the Massachusetts Department of Public Health in February 2015. She was a leader in the creation of the Public Health Data Warehouse in 2017, as part of the newly created Office of Population Health. Announced on May 27, 2021; Bharel resigned on June 18, 2021. Following her government service, she became the global clinical lead for public sector and public health at Google Health.

In December 2021, Bharel was named a senior advisor in the newly-forming cabinet of Boston Mayor Michelle Wu. In 2022, Bharel was honored by Massachusetts Medical Society with its Special Award for Excellence in Medical Service and Woman Physician Leadership.

Elected to the Harvard Board of Overseers in 2022, to complete the remaining four-year term vacated by the resignation of Tracy K. Smith, who then joined the Harvard faculty; Bharel was named its vice chair for the 2025-2026 academic year.

== Publications ==
Several of Bharel's medical papers have been published in the American Journal of Public Health, since 2013, as well as online, and in medical journals.
