= George Floyd protests in Massachusetts =

2020 civil unrest after the murder of George Floyd

- Part of George Floyd protests
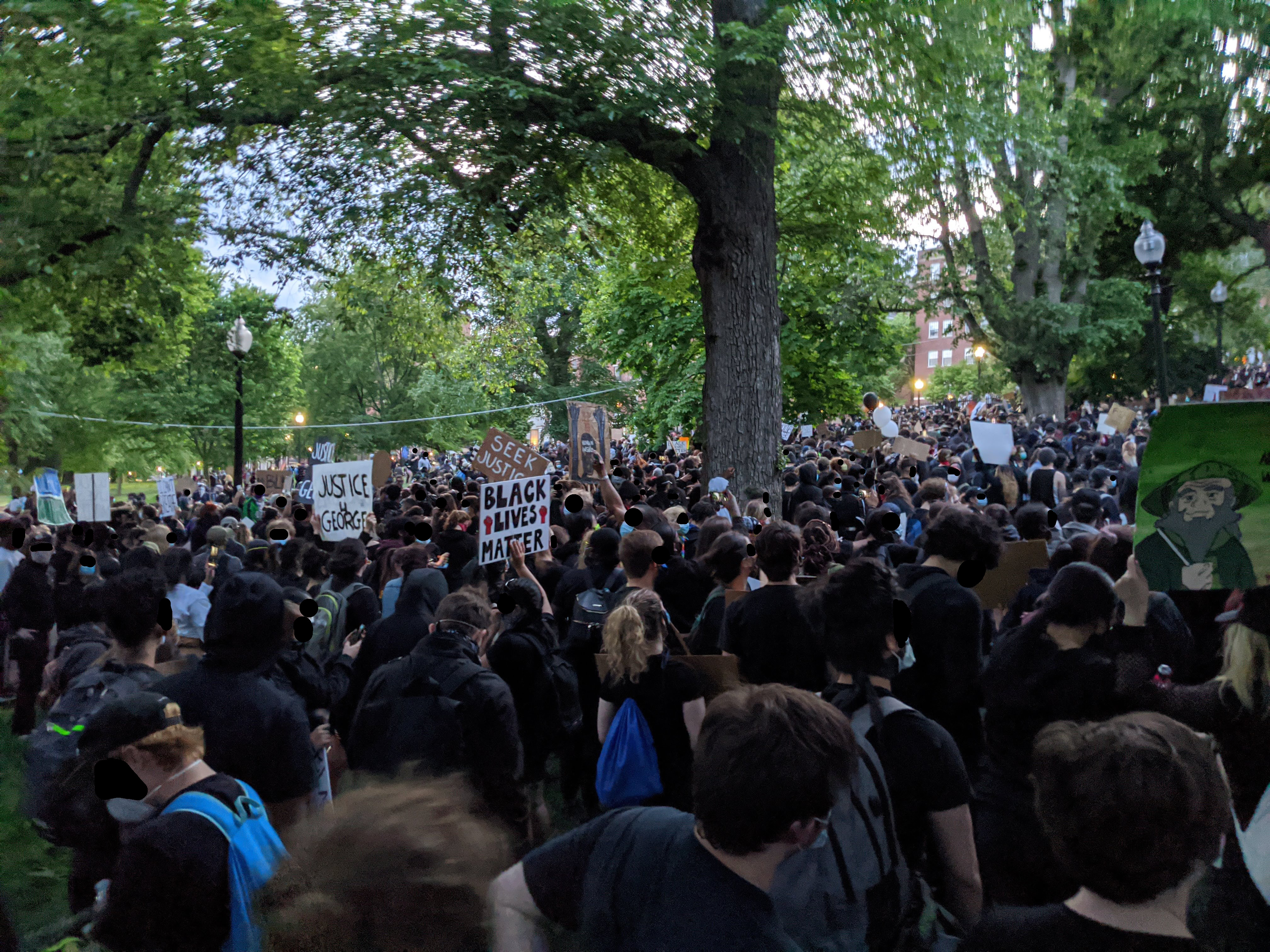
- Protest at Boston Common on May 31
- Date: May 28 – July 2020 (1 month and 3 days)
- Location: Massachusetts, United States
- Caused by: Police brutality; Institutional racism against African Americans; Reaction to the murder of George Floyd; Economic, racial and social inequality

Cities in Massachusetts in which a protest with about 100 or more participants was held

This is a list of George Floyd protests in Massachusetts, United States. Protests and demonstrations occurred in at least 33 cities and towns throughout the state, and as of June 10, 2020 protests had occurred every day since May 28 in Boston.

== Demonstrations ==
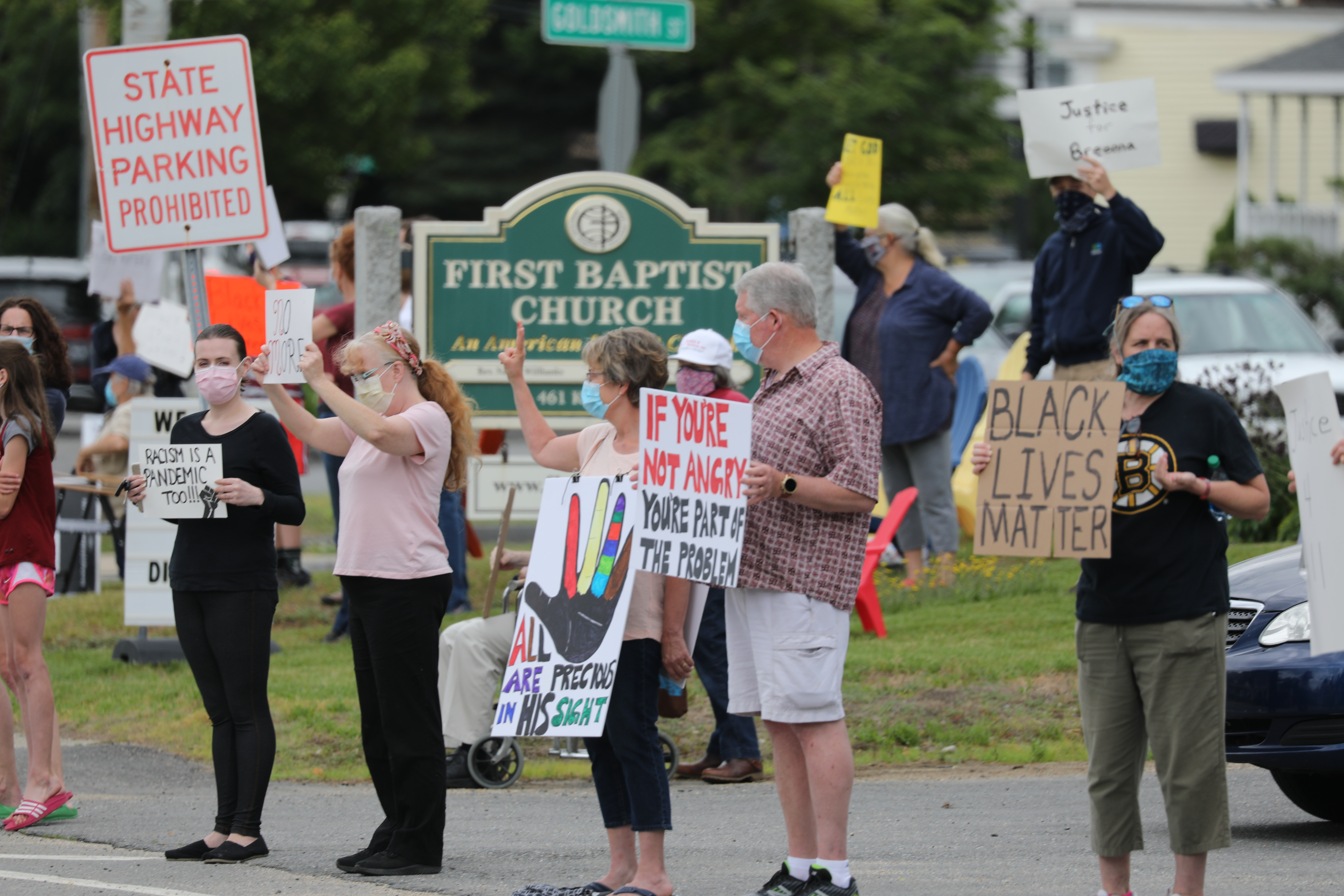
Protest in Littleton, Massachusetts on June 7

=== Amherst ===
More than sixty people peacefully gathered across from the police station on Saturday, May 30.

On June 7, about 250 protesters marched 2.5 miles down Cleveland Avenue to Amherst City Hall.

On June 12, local teens organized a march of more than 200 people that began at Amherst Regional High School and ended at Sweetser Park with a speak-out session for Black teenagers.

=== Boston ===
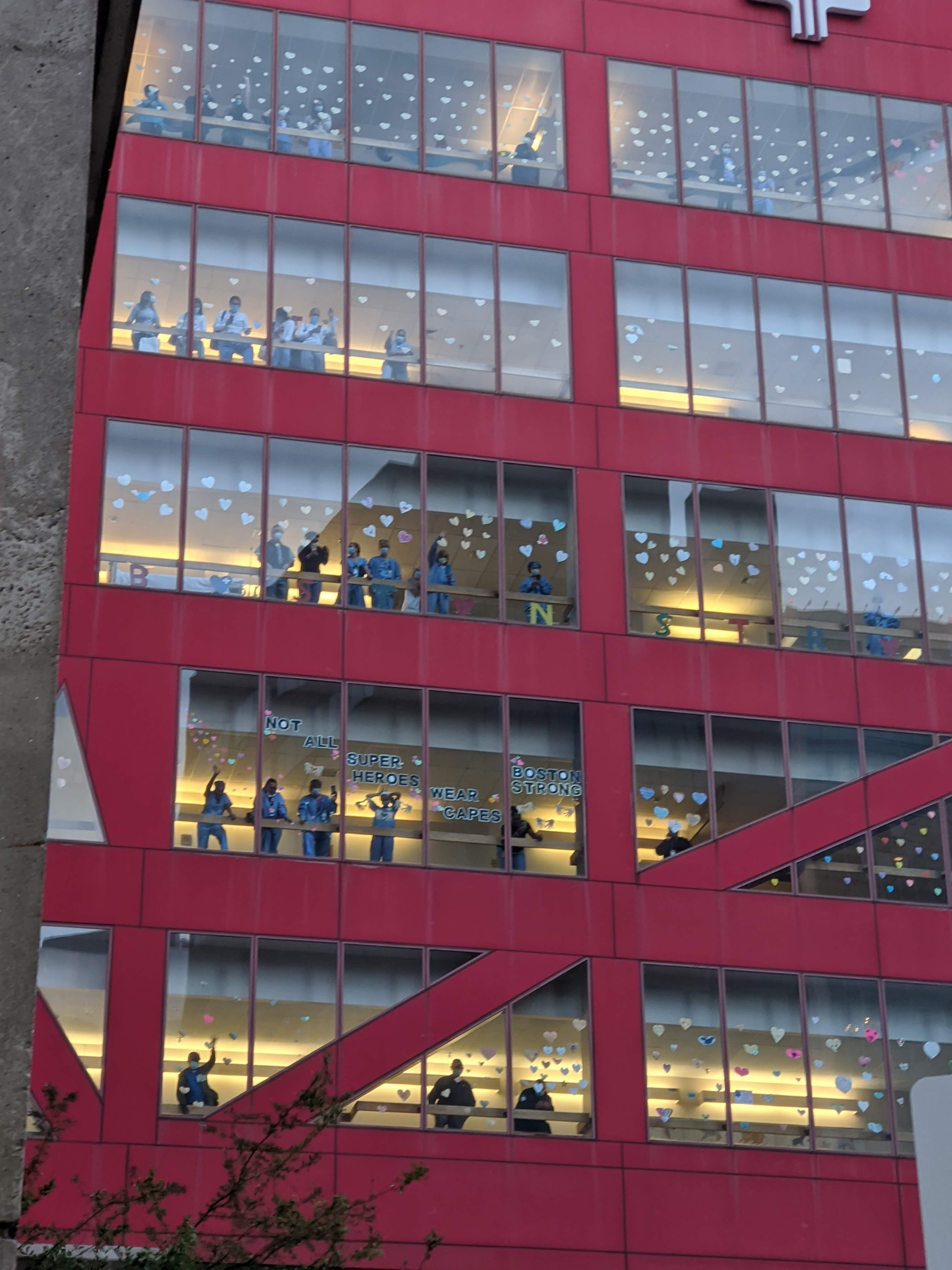
Tufts Medical Center staff observed and cheered for the protesters during the march on May 31

A group of several hundred protesters gathered in Peters Park on Thursday, May 28, in what began as a peaceful demonstration, but escalated after several dozen protesters gathered outside the nearby Precinct 4 police station. Several protesters were pepper sprayed and maced by police officers. The following day, a second large group of protesters clashed with city police, injuring four officers and resulting in ten arrests. On Sunday, May 31, three large protests were held in the city, with the total number of protesters being in the thousands. Though all three began peacefully, violence broke out by nightfall, with police driving squad cars through crowds and firing tear gas without dispersal instruction. Some protesters threw plastic water bottles and set off fireworks, while police used pepper spray and beat people with wooden clubs. Dozens of stores across the city were looted and vandalized from Downtown Crossing and Back Bay to Dorchester, twenty-one police cruisers were damaged, seven officers were hospitalized (with more being treated for injuries in the streets), and over forty arrests were made.

On June 2, communities organized a large protest in Franklin Park, which remained peaceful despite tense stand-offs with both police and the national guard. On June 3, there was a protest on Boston Common. Hundreds of people gathered, the march ended with a die-in, which remained peaceful. On June 4, hundreds attended separate vigils in Jamaica Plain and Roslindale which remained peaceful. On June 4, the MBTA announced that they would no longer use MBTA buses to transport police to protests. Marches and protests have continued every day as of June 10.

On June 25, a rally was held with hundreds in attendance. A demonstration against the protests and in support of police was held with around 50 in attendance, but hundreds of counter-demonstrators.

Over the July 4th weekend, protests continued, with a march from Roxbury to Boston Common on the 4th. In Nubian Square, a 500-foot long Black Lives Matter mural was painted in the street.

=== Brockton ===
On the evening of June 2, hundreds of protesters gathered throughout the city. The protest began as a "peace rally" outside of the middle school, but protesters clashed with police outside of the city police's headquarters by nightfall. Protesters threw water bottles and fireworks, while police deployed tear gas. Several businesses were damaged or looted, including a Dunkin' Donuts that was broken into and set on fire. Both Massachusetts State Police and National Guard forces were deployed to aid the city police, and the confrontation resulted in the MBTA Commuter Rail bypassing Brockton station.

=== Cambridge ===
Protests were held on the weekend of June 6–7, with thousands gathering on Sunday in Cambridge Common, and a smaller crowd gathering on Saturday in Central Square. Over 1,000 people in Cambridge marched in a Black Lives Matter protest on June 20.

=== Cape Cod ===
Hundreds protested around Cape Cod in Falmouth, Hyannis and Provincetown. About 100 people rallied at the Hyannis Village Green on May 30. Vigils were held outside the West Barnstable train station on May 30 and at the Falmouth Village Green on May 31.

=== Chicopee ===
On June 5, several protesters gathered outside the Chicopee Police Department to demand greater police accountability and protest brutality.

=== Easton ===
On June 7, around 700 people marched in support of Black Lives Matter. The event was organized by students from Oliver Ames High School.

=== Fall River ===
Organizers held a "peace walk" on Sunday, May 31, marching throughout the city before ending at Government Center. The walk remained peaceful the whole time. However, an unaffiliated person did vandalize the WLNE-TV news van with the expression RIP George.

A protest with 200 participants occurred on June 4, which also ended peacefully. One person was arrested.

=== Fitchburg ===
On June 3, hundreds marched from Crocker Field to Fitchburg City Hall.

=== Framingham ===
On Thursday, May 28, a group of about thirty protesters peacefully gathered and crowded along sidewalks in the city.

=== Greenfield ===
On May 30, residents from Greenfield and beyond gathered for a "Justice for George Floyd" rally that followed a motorcade that began in surrounding town Erving, running through Millers Falls and Turners Falls, and finally arriving at the Greenfield Common. On June 6, approximately 2,000 people marched a mile and a half from Greenfield Common to the Greenfield Police Station; for nine minutes, protesters laid on the ground or kneeled to honor Floyd.

=== Holden ===
On June 14, dozens of demonstrators gathered at Eagle Lake to protest the murder of George Floyd and others who had been slain by police. Speakers shared their stories about experiencing racism.

=== Holyoke ===
On June 2, over 1,000 people participated in a peaceful march in Holyoke, beginning at City Hall, going on High Street, and ending in front of the police station on Appleton Street.

=== Ipswich ===
On May 30, about 45 vehicles caravanned from the municipal parking lot throughout downtown Ipswich.

=== Lawrence ===
Around 250 to 300 people participated in a rally at Lawrence City Hall on June 7. Two people were arrested for allegedly throwing objects at police.

=== Lowell ===
More than 200 people took part in a march from the Pawtucketville neighborhood across the Howe Bridge and to Lowell City Hall on June 3.

=== Lynn ===
On May 31, a group of protesters gathered in front of the Lynn police department to protest the murder of George Floyd.

On June 10, hundreds took a knee for eight minutes 46 seconds at Lynn Common.

A rally was held on July 4 to remember George Floyd and demand change for the Lynn police department.

=== Nantucket ===
On June 1, more than a hundred people, mostly students, peacefully protested at Tom Nevers field.

=== New Bedford ===
A group of about twenty-five people began peacefully marching around the city in the early afternoon on Saturday, May 30. The crowd gradually grew to a size of almost one hundred protesters, until one of the leaders asked the crowd to disperse at around 9:30 pm and begin again the next day. A second, smaller crowd gathered and resumed protesting the following morning. Protests continued for several days after that, with crowds growing to over 50 people and occasionally over a hundred.

=== Newburyport ===
On May 30, between 100 and 150 people called for justice for George Floyd in Newburyport's Market Square.

=== Newton ===
On Sunday, May 31, hundreds of people peacefully protested at the lawn of Newton City Hall. Mayor of Newton Ruthanne Fuller, School Committee Chairwoman Ruth Goldman, and City Council President Susan Albright were also in attendance. On Thursday, June 4, hundreds of people participated in a second peaceful protest starting at the West Newton police station, in which the participants blocked traffic on Washington Street by kneeling in both directions on the street, chanting “George Floyd, say his name,” “Breonna Taylor, say her name,” and “Hands up, don't shoot.” The demonstrators then marched down Washington Street and eventually reached City Hall in Newton Centre, where they concluded their protest. On June 7, a protest started on the Boston College campus in Chestnut Hill, near the Chestnut Hill Reservoir. This protest targeted the Newton Police Department, and continued along Commonwealth Avenue to City Hall, some 3 miles down the road.

=== Northampton ===
On June 1, more than 1,000 people flooded Center Street protesting against police brutality outside the city's police station. A police cruiser's windshield was smashed, the flag in front of the police station was found burned, and some protesters wrote in chalk and spray paint on the police station resulting in multiple protesters being pepper-sprayed. On June 6, "thousands of people" gathered again at the Northampton Police Station to protest police brutality. Both the Northampton Police Chief and the Mayor of Northampton offered to kneel with protest organizers, but were denied. Despite a large presence of police departments of nearby localities and the Massachusetts State Police, the protest resulted in no violence and no arrests; once the protest mostly dissipated, noted local paper Daily Hampshire Gazette, the day ended with a dance party in the downtown streets.

=== Oak Bluffs ===
On May 31, scores of people protested at Waban Park on Martha's Vineyard. The mother of Danroy Henry, who was shot by Pleasantville police in 2010, said "nothing has changed" since then.

On June 14, hundreds of people demonstrated during a march in downtown Oak Bluffs.

=== Pittsfield ===
On May 30, about 400 people protested at Park Square in Pittsfield.

=== Plymouth ===
On June 3, more than 1000 protesters gathered at Brewster Gardens on Plymouth Waterfront for a vigil sponsored by Indivisible Plymouth, the Plymouth Area League of Women Voters and the Plymouth Police Department.

=== Provincetown ===
A protest was held on May 31 with around a hundred participants, who drove to MacMillan Pier and held a vigil for victims of police brutality.

=== Quincy ===
On June 2, nearly 4,500 people held a vigil at Quincy Center in honor of George Floyd before taking part in an hour-long march down Hancock Street.

=== Salem ===
A peaceful crowd gathered on May 29 in front of the police station in Salem. Another protest was held in the town common on June 6.

On June 10, hundreds joined a caravan from Salem to Lynn.

=== Scituate ===
On Friday, May 30, a small rally in front of the Greenbush rotary in Scituate grew daily to about 50 people on Sunday protesting the murder of George Floyd.

=== Shelburne Falls ===
On June 6, protesters met at the middle of the Iron Bridge and kneeled for nine minutes to honor Floyd.

=== South Hadley ===
On June 7, over 230 demonstrators attended a vigil for racial justice on College Street.

=== Southwick ===
On May 31, demonstrators gathered along Route 202 to protest the murder of George Floyd and police brutality.

=== Springfield ===
Several hundred people peacefully protested outside of the city police's headquarters on Friday, May 29. On June 6, more than 100 people gathered at Court Square, where a prayer was said, to peacefully walk towards and demonstrate at the Springfield police station. More demonstrators added to the gathering at street intersections.

=== Stoughton ===
On June 3, about 200 protesters gathered to demand change in Stoughton's Halloran Park.

On July 4, protesters peacefully marched from Faxon Park to town hall in support of Black Lives Matter.

=== Taunton ===
A protest was planned to take place on the evening of June 4. Following the looting that occurred in the Brockton protest a few days earlier, many Taunton businesses boarded up their doors and windows in preparation, and several helicopters and National Guard forces remained on standby around the city once the protest began. A group of about six-hundred people gathered outside of the First Parish Church across from the city's police station in the early afternoon, before most relocated to the nearby city green space, where many encouraged police officers to take a knee in solidarity. Once the officers did so, most protesters dispersed without incident.

=== Wellfleet ===
On May 31, around 100 people marched from Town Hall to the Wellfleet Police Department to protest the murder of George Floyd.

=== Worcester ===
On June 1, thousands of people peacefully participated in a march from the City Hall commons area to the courthouse. Hours later, a group of protesters in the Main South neighborhood met a police barricade, which led to the crowd being dispersed into two directions. A group that continued down main street were said to have set off fireworks and thrown rocks at officers, leading to tear gas and rubber bullets being fired into a crowd of about seventy people. Multiple people were taking into custody and at least one business was reported looted. On June 6, hundreds gathered in Worcester Common to demonstrate.
