= BCEC =

BCEC may refer to:

- Batangas City Embassy Chill, a professional basketball team in the Philippines.
- Boston Convention and Exhibition Center, the largest exhibition center in the Northeast United States.
- Brisbane Convention & Exhibition Centre, a convention center in Brisbane, Australia.
- Buncombe County Early College, a program at Asheville-Buncombe Technical Community College in Asheville, North Carolina.
