= COVID-19 pandemic in Boston =

- Disease: COVID-19
- Pathogen: SARS-CoV-2
- Location: Boston, Massachusetts, U.S.
- First outbreak: Wuhan, Hubei, China
- Index case: Dorchester
- Arrival date: February 1, 2020 (6 years, 8 months and 4 weeks)

Government website
- Coronavirus Disease 2019 (COVID-19) in Boston

The COVID-19 pandemic in Boston was part of an ongoing viral pandemic of coronavirus disease 2019 (COVID-19) in the Massachusetts city of Boston. The first confirmed case was reported on February 1, 2020, and the number of cases began to increase rapidly by March 8. Massachusetts Governor Charlie Baker declared a state of emergency on March 10. Mayor Marty Walsh declared a public health emergency on March 15. By March 21, more than a hundred people in Boston had tested positive for COVID-19. Most early cases were traceable to a company meeting held in late February by the biotechnology firm Biogen in Boston.

In May, Boston was first in Massachusetts for overall number of cases and eighteenth for cases per capita citywide. New cases per day peaked on April 24, 2020, at 659, and began to decline after. As of October 14, 2020, Boston has the highest number of cases in Massachusetts and the 38th-highest number of cases per capita.

As of March 8, 2021, there were 59,953 cumulative cases and 1,286 deaths due to COVID-19 in Boston. 11.4% of cases required hospitalization, 2.7% of cases resulted in death, and 84.6% of cases have recovered. 9.8% of cases were healthcare workers, and 46% of deaths were in long-term care facilities. As of October 12, Boston had completed 308,851 molecular tests, 4.5% of which came back positive in the preceding week. Citywide, 45% of residents had been tested.

== Timeline ==
=== 2020 ===
==== February ====
The first confirmed case of COVID-19 was reported by state officials on February 1. The individual, a male in his 20s, had recently returned from Wuhan, China and began experiencing symptoms. He sought medical care but did not require hospitalization, and was therefore able to self-isolate and recover at home.

175 executives of Biogen, a biotechnology company based in Cambridge, held a two-day leadership conference from February 26–28 at the Boston Marriott Long Wharf hotel. On February 29, a Biogen executive began to develop symptoms and sought treatment at a Boston area hospital. Suspecting COVID-19 was the cause of the illness, the executive requested a test, but was told by hospital staff that it was not necessary.

==== March ====
On March 4, staff from Biogen contacted the Massachusetts Department of Public Health to report two executives who had attended the February employee meeting had tested positive for SARS-CoV-2 upon returning home from Europe. The same day, a "significant number" of Biogen employees asked to be tested for the virus. On March 5, Biogen reported that three individuals who had attended the company event in Boston the previous week had tested positive for SARS-CoV-2.

On March 6, the Boston Public Health Commission announced three new presumptive cases of SARS-CoV-2. Governor Charlie Baker declared a state of emergency for the state of Massachusetts on March 10. On March 13, the 2020 Boston Marathon was postponed to September 14, 2020. Boston Mayor Marty Walsh announced the closure of all Boston schools from March 17 until April 27.

On March 12, the Boston Marriott Long Wharf hotel, which had hosted the Biogen company gathering, closed temporarily. In a letter to their guests, the hotel said it made the decision in cooperation with the Boston Public Health Commission. On March 15, Mayor Walsh declared a public health emergency due to the concerns over COVID-19. Restaurants, bar rooms, and nightclubs were required to reduce their capacity by at least 50 percent. Governor Charlie Baker limited gatherings to below 25 people.

On March 15, Baker ordered all schools in Massachusetts to close for three weeks, from March 17 through April 7. The same day, he also banned eating at restaurants, banned gatherings of more than 25 people, and relaxed unemployment claim requirements. On March 16, Mayor Walsh announced the closure of the Boston Public Library system. The MBTA also announced that service would be reduced starting March 17. Mayor Walsh also announced the closure of all construction sites starting March 17. On March 18, the City of Boston closed all playgrounds.

The Massachusetts Bay Transportation Authority (MBTA) announced that, starting March 17, it would run the subway and buses at Saturday levels of service during the week. The next day, service was increased on the Blue Line, Green Line E branch, and some bus lines to reduce crowding. Frequency on Massport shuttles to Logan International Airport was reduced or canceled.

On March 23, Massachusetts Governor Charlie Baker issued an order for all employers that do not provide essential services to close their workspaces. The limit of gatherings was lowered to 10 people. Massachusetts Department of Public Health issued a two-week stay-at-home advisory. On March 25, Governor Baker extended the closure of schools to May 4. On March 31, Governor Baker extended his non-essential business closure to May 4. On March 31, the Boston Police Department confirmed that 19 officers and three civilian employees had all tested positive.

==== April ====
On April 2, Mayor Walsh announced plans to convert the Boston Convention and Exhibition Center (BCEC) into a field hospital with 500 beds assigned to the homeless and 500 to accept COVID-19 patients from city hospitals. On April 5, Mayor Walsh announced new regulations for social distancing in Boston. He encouraged everyone to wear a face covering when outside. The BPHC ordered for everyone except essential workers stay at home from 9:00 pm to 6:00 am every day, enforcing a curfew.

On April 5, Boston City Hall was closed to the public except for Tuesdays and Fridays, from 9:00 am to 5:00 pm. Every individual entering City Hall, including employees, was required to complete a self-screening for COVID-19 symptoms. On April 9, MIT published a study of sewage samples taken in the Boston area on March 25, to determine the extent of COVID-19 infections. The study suggested that approximately 115,000 of the Boston region's 2.3 million people were infected. At the time of sampling, Boston had only 284 confirmed cases in the area.

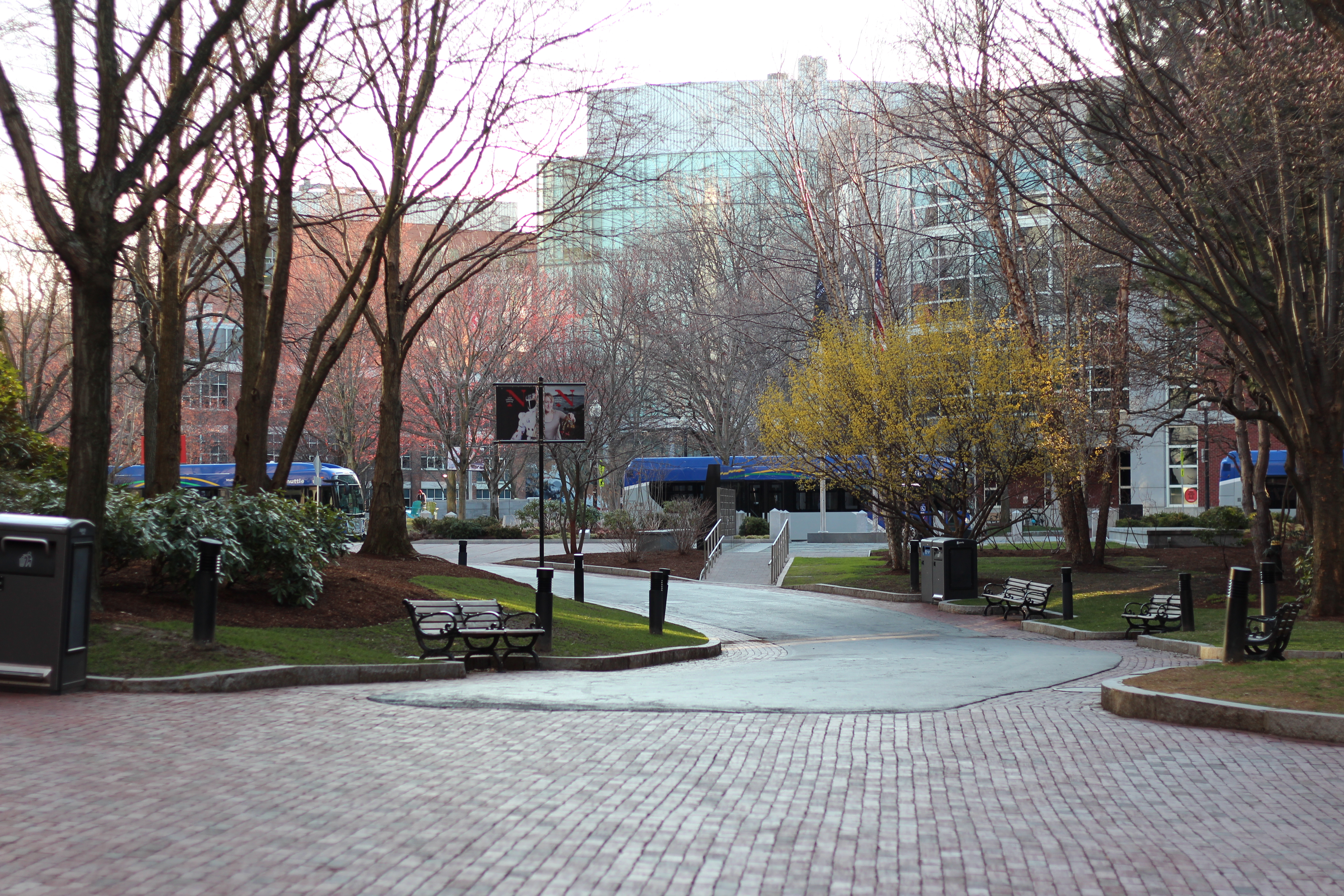
An empty Northeastern University in Boston after most of the students were required to leave

On April 10, Boston reduced parking near the Arnold Arboretum. On April 16, Mayor Walsh announced that a thousand residents will be invited to a Massachusetts study related to COVID-19 antibody testing. On April 21, Governor Baker announced the closure of all K-12 schools in Massachusetts through the end of the school year. On April 22, former 2020 Democratic presidential candidate and U.S. Senator Elizabeth Warren from Massachusetts announced that her oldest brother had died from COVID-19 in Oklahoma.

On April 25, Governor Baker addressed the topic of when stay-at-home measures and closures of non-essential businesses would end. When restrictions were originally announced in mid-March, they were to end at noon on April 7; later their projected end date was pushed to May 4. Baker said it was unlikely restrictions would be lifted by then because the surge of cases had hit later than expected – May 4 presumed a surge in early April. Baker said the process of reopening will begin when hospitalizations start to decline consistently, and when there is "some evidence that we are in fact over the hump ... with respect to the surge."

On April 27, Boston Public Health Commission extended the public health emergency declaration until further notice. On April 28, Governor Baker extended the stay-at-home advisory and non-essential business closure to May 18. He also said that once the advisory expires, the process of reopening will begin in stages, and not happen all at once. On April 29, the Public Health Advisory enforcing a curfew in Boston was extended to May 18.

==== May ====
On May 1, Massachusetts Governor Charlie Baker ordered all residents to wear a mask in public places when social distancing measures are not possible. This order goes into effect on May 6. On May 6, the city of Boston launched a major expansion in the public testing of COVID-19 in Boston. On May 8, Boston city officials announced that all parades and festivals were to be suspended to and on September 7.

On May 13, Massachusetts Governor Charlie Baker announced his guidelines for reopening, starting May 18. He mentioned that the reopening will be in four phases. The first phase, will be very strict reopening, with just a few businesses opening again with social distancing and mask wearing regulations. The second phase will be cautious, with strict regulations remaining but more businesses reopening. The third phase will be a vigilant phase where most businesses open, but with very strict regulations. The fourth and final phase, as Baker stated, will be when a COVID-19 vaccine allows resumption of a new normal.

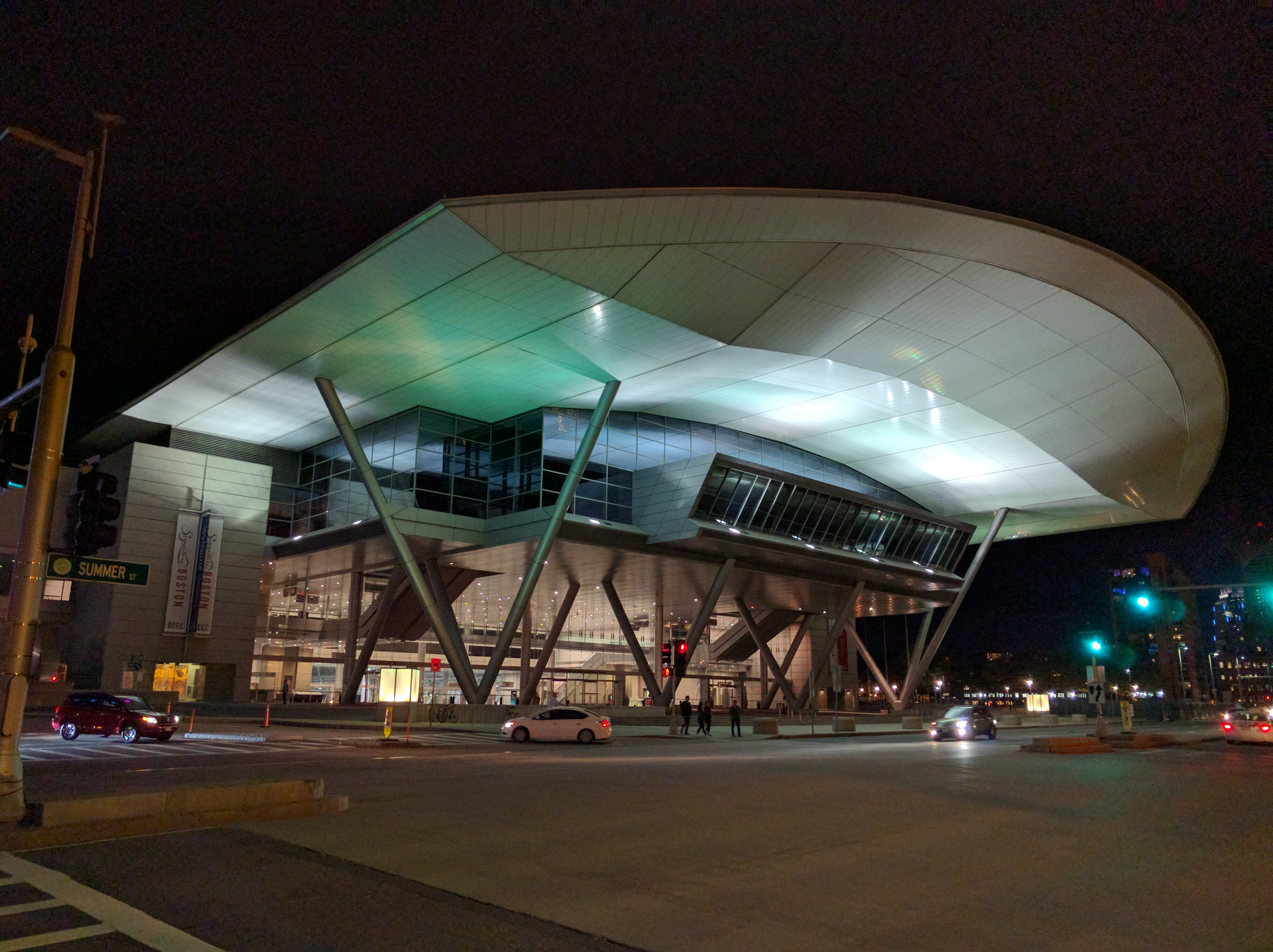
Exterior of the Boston Convention and Exhibition Center. The BCEC was converted to a field hospital, but stopped accepting new patients in May.

On May 16, Mayor Walsh released results of antibody testing among Boston residents. He stated that antibodies were present in 9.9% of the 750 residents tested. 2.6% of the residents were asymptomatic and tested positive for COVID-19. Mayor Walsh stated that most residents of Boston have not been yet exposed to the virus.

On May 18, Governor Baker released the details of the plan to reopen businesses in Massachusetts, and renamed the stay-at-home advisory to a "safer at home" advisory. The plan allows places of worship, essential businesses, manufacturing businesses, and construction sites to reopen with strict restrictions on May 18. Baker also announced that people who choose to ride the MBTA will be required to wear masks.

On May 26, all construction was to be allowed in Boston, with social distancing and mask wearing. On May 26, Governor Baker announced that the Boston Hope field hospital would no longer be accepting new patients. On May 28, the Boston Marathon was cancelled for the first time in 124 years. Instead, the marathon was to be held as a virtual event.

On May 28, Mayor Walsh announced a new "healthy streets" program to promote social distancing in the roads of Boston. Bus stops would be expanded, bike lakes would be built more quickly, and outdoor seating at restaurants would expand. On May 29, the City of Boston released a "return to workplace framework" to safely reopen workplaces. Social distancing of 6 feet was to be enforced in all workplaces. Workplaces were to reduce capacity, ensure access to handwashing facilities, and clean and disinfect frequently.

==== June ====
Massachusetts Governor Baker announced on June 6 that Phase 2 of his reopening plan was to begin on June 8. This was to allow childcare, day camps, lodging retail stores, and outdoor seating at restaurants to reopen with restrictions. On June 8, the Public Health Advisory enforcing a curfew in Boston from 9:00 pm to 6:00 am was lifted. This came with the start of Phase 2 of the state's reopening plan.

On June 9, Mayor Walsh and the East Boston Neighborhood Health Center set up a new pop-up testing site in Roxbury. This is as a result of the recent protests in and around Boston over the murder of George Floyd. On June 11, the Cambridge-based biotech company Moderna announced they had developed a COVID-19 vaccine ready to be tested in a large scale. Moderna had 30,000 volunteers ready to test the vaccine in July, to see its effects.

On June 11, Massachusetts announced a study with 150 volunteers to test if COVID-19 survivor plasma can prevent COVID-19. Thousands of COVID-19 patients worldwide have been treated with convalescent plasma already. On June 12, Boston Public Library announced the launch of their "BPL to Go" program on June 22. This program allowed patrons to "order" library items by placing a hold on the item, and then safely picking up the item from a branch library.

On June 15, Boston reopened all city playgrounds for the first time in three months. As the city was reopening, Mayor Walsh stated that playgrounds should reopen, although with strict restrictions in place. On June 17, the state of Massachusetts urged everyone who participated in the George Floyd protests in Massachusetts to get tested for COVID-19. The state had set up over 50 pop-up free testing sites specifically for these protesters. These testing sites were to be open only on June 17 and June 18.

On June 19, Massachusetts Governor Baker announced that Step 2 of Phase 2 of reopening in Massachusetts was to begin on June 22. This change came as Governor Baker stated that the trends of COVID-19 statewide have been positive. This will allow indoor dining, nail salons, and tanning salons to begin opening. Also, workplaces in Boston, which were previously required to reduce capacity to 25%, were now allowed to increase capacity to 50% of their original capacity before the pandemic.

On June 23, Governor Baker announced the test results of those who has participated in Black Lives Matter protests. He announced that only 2.5% of the protesters who tested were positive, and Governor Baker stated that he was very pleased with these results.

On June 30, Governor Baker stated that Massachusetts may begin Phase 3 of reopening as early as July 6. Although he was still looking at the data, he announced his plan for Phase 3 of reopening in the state. Phase 3 was to allow museums, fitness centers, moderate-size movie theaters, overnight youth camps, sports for all ages, and indoor recreational facilities to open with social distancing and mask wearing restrictions remaining in place.

==== July ====
On July 1, a new COVID-19 testing site opened in North End of Boston. NEW Health, an affiliate of Massachusetts General Hospital and Boston Medical Center, offered a new testing site on Tuesdays and Thursdays from 9:00 a.m. to 12:00 p.m.

On July 2, Massachusetts announced that Step 1 of Phase 3 of reopening in Massachusetts was to begin on July 6, in all of Massachusetts except Boston. Boston was to enter Step 1 of Phase 3 one week later, on July 13. This was to allow indoor gatherings of up to 25 people, and outdoor gatherings of up to 100 people. Movie theaters, museums, and sports were allowed to resume. However, social distancing restrictions were to remain in place, with 40% capacity limits on movie theaters and gyms. Masks were also to remain mandatory in all public places.

On July 7, Mayor Walsh stated in a press conference that Boston may be the first city to truly recover from COVID-19. He stated if the residents continue to follow COVID-19 precautions, Boston could recover from COVID-19 within just a few months. On July 13, the City of Boston included the casino Encore Boston Harbor in the list of businesses that could open in Phase 3. However, customers were to be required to wear masks, have temperature screening at entry, and practice social distancing

On July 16, Mayor Walsh urged all Boston residents to get tested for COVID-19. Boston Health and Human Services Chief Marty Martinez stated anyone who has not been practicing social distancing or wearing a face mask should be tested. On July 21, the Massachusetts Interscholastic Athletic Association's Board of Directors voted to delay the start of the fall sports season until September 14. This decision was made in compliance with state guidelines for K-12 sports in the state. On July 21, Mayor Walsh announced another free pop-up testing site had opened in Allston. The City of Boston partnered with East Boston Neighborhood Health Center to make this testing site available.

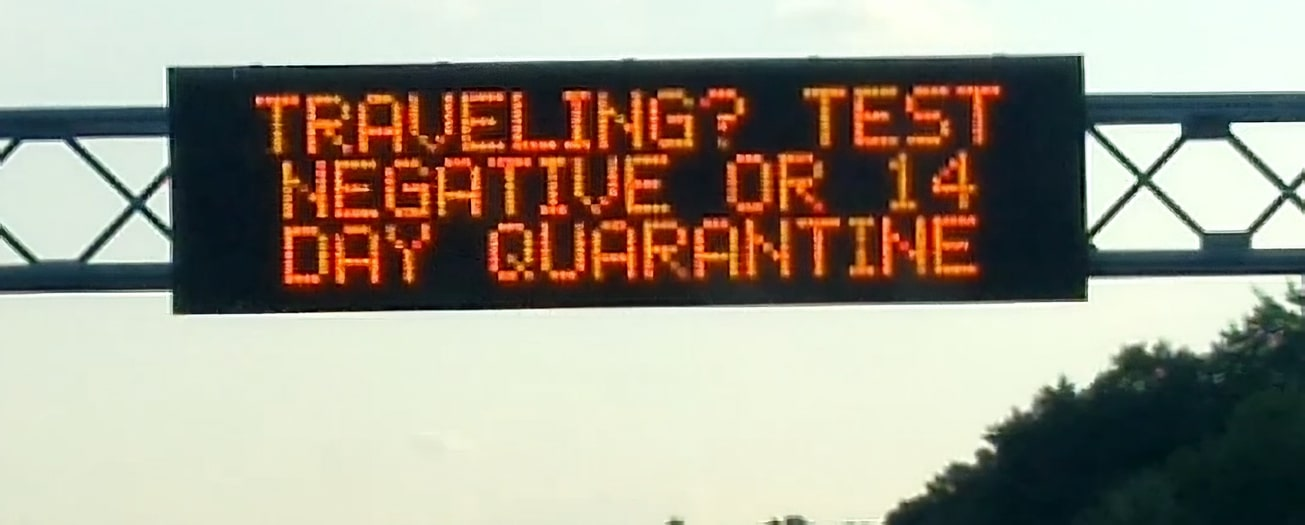
LED matrix sign over I-93 in Boston displaying the COVID-19 travel restriction in Massachusetts

On July 24, Massachusetts Governor Baker announced a new travel restriction for the state, which was to go into effect on August 1. All individuals coming into Massachusetts from another state was required to fill out a "Massachusetts Travel Form" and quarantine at home for 14 days. The originally exempt states were Connecticut, New Hampshire, Rhode Island, Vermont, Maine, Hawaii, New Jersey, and New York. For a state to be exempt, the seven-day average of daily cases was required to be less than six per 100,000, and the positive test rate was required to be less than five percent. This order was to be punishable by a $500 fine for each day a traveler was not following the order.

==== August ====
On August 1, Mayor Walsh announced that Boston Public Schools would not return to 100% in-person learning even if in-class learning would resume in the fall. He stated that students would participate in a hybrid of in-school and remote learning. He also gave parents the option to have their children participate in 100% remote learning.

On August 7, Massachusetts Governor Baker took steps to slow reopening in the state. He reduced the limit on outdoor gatherings from 100 to 50 people, which would apply in both public and private property. He also said restaurant guidelines would be updated so that alcoholic beverages were not served. Baker said he was creating a COVID Enforcement and Intervention Team for enforcement in high-risk communities. The state was to postpone Step 2 of Phase 3 of reopening indefinitely.

On August 18, Mayor Walsh stated in a press conference that encouraging trends in COVID-19 in Boston had resumed, but urged residents to remain vigilant. "The uptick that we saw in the second half of July has leveled off," Mayor Walsh stated during his coronavirus briefing. He said that the weekly positive test rate for the week ending August 10 was 2.6%, down from 2.8% the previous week.

On August 19, the Massachusetts Department of Public Health announced that all children aged six months and older would need to receive a flu vaccine by December 31, 2020, in order to attend childcare, K–12 schools, and colleges and universities in the state. There is an allowance for medical or religious exemptions, and homeschooled K–12 students or higher education students who are not going on campus will not be required to receive the vaccination.

On August 21, Mayor Walsh announced that Boston Public Schools would begin the school year 100% remotely before transitioning into a hybrid model. "On September 21st — one month from today — all students will begin with remote learning," he said. "The first students will not return to our classrooms until October 1st." The BPS superintendent and Mayor Walsh formed a 4-phase return to a hybrid model.

==== September ====
On September 10, Governor Baker said he "couldn't imagine a reason" to not go back to in-person or hybrid learning in the state's green and white communities in terms of spread in COVID-19. However, he has been encouraging communities in the yellow and red zones to stick with remote learning.

On September 11, testing for COVID-19 at Orig3n, a Boston lab, was suspended after 383 false positives were recorded. In response, MDPH and BPHC gave the lab until September 14 to write a plan of correction in order to resume testing.

By mid-September, Boston College began seeing a significant spike in COVID-19 cases. About a dozen cases in August had turned into an outbreak in the swimming teams at the college. Mayor Walsh said this outbreak is a "serious matter" and that he had been communicating with state officials.

On September 15, Massachusetts Governor Baker announced a plan to "re-engage" colleges on testing, contact tracing, in response to the Boston College outbreak. He said his administration was reviewing all the protocols for testing, tracing, quarantine, and isolation in colleges across the state. Mayor Walsh also said he will meet with college leaders on September 16 to address the issue to them.

On September 29, Governor Baker announced that communities in the state classified by the state as "lower risk" would be allowed to move into Step 2 of Phase 3 of the state's reopening plan beginning on October 5. At the time, Boston had been considered a "red zone" community, meaning they were to remain at Step 1 of Phase 3 of reopening.

==== October ====
The Massachusetts Department of Elementary and Secondary Education announced on October 2 that they would begin providing weekly reports on the number of COVID-19 cases detected in schools. In the first report, covering the period from September 24 to September 30, 63 cases were found among students and 34 among staff.

On October 7, Boston delayed the next phase of in-person learning in Boston Public Schools, in response to an uptick in cases. The positive test rate in the city had increased to 4.1%, prompting city officials to put a pause on moving forward with in-person learning. High-needs students were to continue in-person learning. Both Boston officials and the Boston Teachers Union agreed with this decision.

On October 15, 2020, Boston Mayor Walsh announced new COVID-19 enforcement measures in the city amidst a spike in cases. He said that too many violations of COVID-19 restrictions and safety rules have led him to this decision. He mentioned a plan to tighten gathering limits, restrictions on public events, and activities in parks. Walsh stated he was considering fines for violations of these new safety rules. On Wednesday, he partnered with Whittier Street Health Center to open a second mobile testing facility in Nubian Square.

On October 16, Massachusetts state officials loosened travel restrictions amid an uptick in cases. The state changed the threshold for being a lower-risk state to 10 cases per 100,000 people, in a seven-day rolling average. States below that, and a 5% test rate on a 7-day moving average, were to be exempt from the travel order laid out in July. State officials said this would put Massachusetts on standard with other states' COVID-19 travel restrictions.

On October 16, Boston further delayed Phase 3 of in-person learning to October 29. Mayor Walsh decided to further delay in-person learning to October 29, after an initial delay one week ago. This was done in response to the city's positive test rate further increasing to 4.4% in the preceding week.

== Epidemiology ==
=== Spread among population groups ===
As of October 15, Boston had 18,446 confirmed cases of COVID-19. As of October 8, a total of 1,756 cases (9.8%) were healthcare workers. As of October 8, a cumulative total of 2,037 cases (11.4%) had required hospitalization. Deaths in Boston have been concentrated among the elderly. As of October 15, Boston had 769 reported deaths due to SARS-CoV-2. Many deaths from COVID-19 have been at long-term care facilities. As of October 13, a total of 352 COVID-19 related deaths (46%) in Boston were in long-term care facilities. As of April 23, a total of 453 cases (6.5%) were among the homeless.

==== Cases and deaths by ethnicity ====
Many Boston COVID-19 confirmed cases were attributed to a race/ethnicity by the Boston Public Health Commission. BPHC updates these numbers on weekdays.

Total cases by race as of October 15, 2020
Race/ethnicity	Total cases	Percent
Total race-identified	16414	100%
Asian	662	4%
Black/African-American	5079	31%
Latino/Hispanic	5303	32%
White	4235	26%
Other	1135	7%

Most Boston COVID-19 deaths were also identified to a race/ethnicity. BPHC updates these numbers on weekdays as well.

Total deaths by race as of October 15, 2020
Race/ethnicity	Total deaths	Percent
Total race-identified	769	100%
Asian	51	7%
Black/African-American	267	35%
Latino/Hispanic	90	12%
White	339	44%
Other	22	3%

==== Cases by age group ====
Case rates have been significantly higher among the elderly.

Confirmed COVID-19 cases in Boston by age as of October 8
Classification		Cases		
Classification		Total	Rate per 100,000	% of total cases
Age	80+	1266	6448.5	7.1%
Age	70–79	1248	3899.1	7%
Age	60–69	2069	3676.7	11.6%
Age	50–59	2783	3791.7	15.6%
Age	40–49	2604	3488.5	14.6%
Age	30–39	3050	2620.2	17.1%
Age	20–29	3479	2086.7	19.5%
Age	10–19	892	1163.7	5%
Age	0–9	428	669.8	2.4%
Age	Unknown	23	N/A	0.13%
Total		17842	2626.1	100%
Source: Boston Public Health Commission COVID-19 Report

==== Cases by sex ====
Overall, cases and case rates have been approximately equal across both genders in Boston.

Confirmed COVID-19 cases in Boston by gender as of October 8
Classification		Cases		
Classification		Total	Rate per 100,000	% of total cases
Sex	Male	8546	2613.5	47.9%
Sex	Female	9135	2589.2	51.2%
Sex	Unknown	161	N/A	0.9%
Total		17842	2626.1	100%
Source: Boston Public Health Commission COVID-19 Report

=== Cases by category ===
The Boston Public Health Commission has rolled out a data dashboard for COVID-19 which is updated daily through Boston's government website.

Coronavirus disease 2019 (COVID-19) cases in Boston
	Cases			Deaths			Recoveries			Hospitalizations	
Date	Total Confirmed	Increase	% Change	Total Died	Increase	% Change	Total Recovered	Increase	% Change	Cumulative	Source
September 15	16310	+65	+0.4%	759	+2	+0.3%	12827	+124	+1%	2000	
September 16	16370	+60	+0.4%	759	0	0%	12935	+108	+1%	2000	
September 17	16430	+60	+0.4%	759	0	0%	13045	+110	+1%	2003	
September 18	16514	+84	+1%	760	+1	+0.1%	13180	+135	+1%	2003	
September 19	16584	+70	+0.4%	760	0	0%	13180	0	0%	2003	
September 20	16619	+35	+0.2%	760	0	0%	13180	0	0%	2003	
September 21	16676	+57	+0.3%	761	+1	+0.1%	13357	+177	+1%	2003	
September 22	16703	+27	+0.2%	761	0	0%	13467	+110	+1%	2003	
September 23	16766	+63	+0.4%	761	0	0%	13605	+138	+1%	2003	
September 24	16836	+70	+0.4%	762	+1	+0.1%	13734	+129	+1%	2012	
September 25	16924	+88	+1%	762	0	0%	13852	+118	+1%	2012	
September 26	16977	+53	+0.3%	762	0	0%	13852	0	0%	2012	
September 27	17017	+40	+0.2%	762	0	0%	13852	0	0%	2012	
September 28	17140	+123	+1%	763	+1	+0.1%	14046	+194	+1%	2012	
September 29	17186	+40	+0.3%	763	0	0%	14174	+128	+1%	2012	
September 30	17247	+61	+0.4%	763	0	0%	14253	+79	+1%	2012	
October 1	17329	+82	+0.5%	764	+1	+0.1%	14399	+146	+1%	2029	
October 2	17427	+98	+1%	764	0	0%	14529	+130	+1%	2029	
October 3	17505	+78	+0.5%	764	0	0%	14529	0	0%	2029	
October 4	17557	+52	+0.3%	764	0	0%	14529	0	0%	2029	
October 5	17649	+92	+1%	764	0	0%	14723	+194	+1%	2029	
October 6	17712	+63	+0.4%	764	0	0%	14857	+134	+1%	2029	
October 7	17774	+62	+0.4%	764	0	0%	14981	+124	+1%	2029	
October 8	17842	+68	+0.4%	764	0	0%	15099	+118	+1%	2037	
October 9	17937	+95	+1%	764	0	0%	15175	+76	+1%	2037	
October 10	18002	+65	+0.4%	764	0	0%	15175	0	0%	2037	
October 11	18038	+36	+0.2%	764	0	0%	15175	0	0%	2037	
October 12	18136	+98	+1%	764	0	0%	15175	0	0%	2037	
October 13	18275	+139	+1%	768	+4	+1%	15445	+270	+2%	2037	
October 14	18338	+63	+0.3%	768	0	0%	15594	+149	+1%	2037	
October 15	18446	+108	+1%	769	+1	+0.1%	15692	+98	+1%	2049	
Date	Total Confirmed	Increase	% Change	Total Died	Increase	% Change	Total Recovered	Increase	% Change	Cumulative	Source
	Cases			Deaths			Recoveries			Hospitalizations	

=== Cases by district ===
Most Boston COVID-19 cases were traced to a district by Boston Public Health Commission. BPHC releases a public weekly report including COVID-19 cases by district in Boston.

Boston COVID-19 cases (cumulative) by district
Date	Allston and Brighton	Back Bay, Beacon Hill, North End, West End, Downtown	Charlestown	East Boston	Dorchester	Fenway	Hyde Park	Jamaica Plain	Mattapan	Mid Dorchester	Roslindale	Roxbury	South Boston	South End	West Roxbury	Unknown	Source
March 28	29	47	10	41	37	25	26	13	13	29	18	16	26	28	5		
April 2	80	86	29	130	175	46	104	52	72	131	73	78	66	70	38		
April 9	188	129	50	238	444	68	228	124	169	323	162	198	112	282	97	36	
April 16	318	185	73	410	705	91	413	253	298	569	302	335	175	372	208	56	
April 23	436	236	103	688	1033	122	617	376	440	878	405	475	216	531	291	111	
April 30	551	299	119	971	1385	176	793	499	548	1199	522	677	339	665	353	175	
May 7	643	328	140	1187	1610	228	890	575	617	1390	585	777	387	701	386	154	
May 14	698	347	149	1281	1746	252	958	605	668	1514	631	846	397	727	407	169	
May 21	750	434	159	1387	1890	262	1020	634	710	1617	677	880	413	807	417	182	
May 28	794	454	172	1457	1945	271	1056	652	733	1650	691	909	420	821	428	181	
June 4	820	459	182	1495	1981	282	1073	664	744	1684	707	928	431	836	441	179	
June 11	835	463	187	1542	2005	282	1069	667	753	1713	724	953	438	868	444	175	
June 18	839	470	189	1582	2016	283	1072	682	761	1725	730	966	442	878	453	173	
June 25	846	479	192	1607	2038	286	1076	687	765	1740	734	975	448	884	455	170	
July 1	850	486	195	1635	2047	294	1079	690	766	1745	729	979	452	892	456	172	
July 9	865	497	199	1665	2072	300	1088	696	776	1763	737	990	467	905	458	172	
July 16	868	506	202	1688	2090	302	1099	702	782	1781	741	1000	483	913	464	172	
July 23	879	511	204	1697	2114	306	1103	714	789	1795	742	1020	495	918	464	173	
July 30	890	519	206	1726	2129	309	1110	718	804	1827	749	1035	504	923	468	176	
August 6	907	535	211	1789	2169	319	1130	736	816	1864	763	1052	519	933	476	186	
August 13	919	550	215	1864	2203	326	1145	747	830	1900	783	1075	525	943	480	190	
August 20	932	564	222	1970	2226	342	1160	751	842	1944	801	1102	529	962	481	190	
August 27	957	575	227	2105	2258	366	1169	769	849	1983	812	1124	534	972	484	190	
September 3	984	588	235	2197	2285	390	1182	796	861	2024	823	1156	542	979	491	197	
September 10	1020	600	238	2260	2307	417	1190	810	869	2064	839	1184	554	989	505	206	
September 17	1101	628	235	2289	2336	439	1202	827	875	2074	864	1223	588	989	523	237	
September 24	1133	642	241	2348	2379	465	1225	843	883	2132	881	1263	621	1000	531	249	
October 1	1197	663	246	2420	2431	487	1257	855	904	2198	909	1289	661	1019	543	250	
October 8	1248	683	251	2464	2510	509	1294	881	916	2280	922	1330	702	1033	555	264	
Date	Allston and Brighton	Back Bay, Beacon Hill, North End, West End, Downtown	Charlestown	East Boston	Dorchester	Fenway	Hyde Park	Jamaica Plain	Mattapan	Mid Dorchester	Roslindale	Roxbury	South Boston	South End	West Roxbury	Unknown	Source
District pop. (2010)	66,865	42,046	16,439	43,265	71,623	54,566	28,488	34,837	21,964	60,413	29,826	40,527	38,100	33,881	25,861		

== Government response ==
=== Closures and orders ===
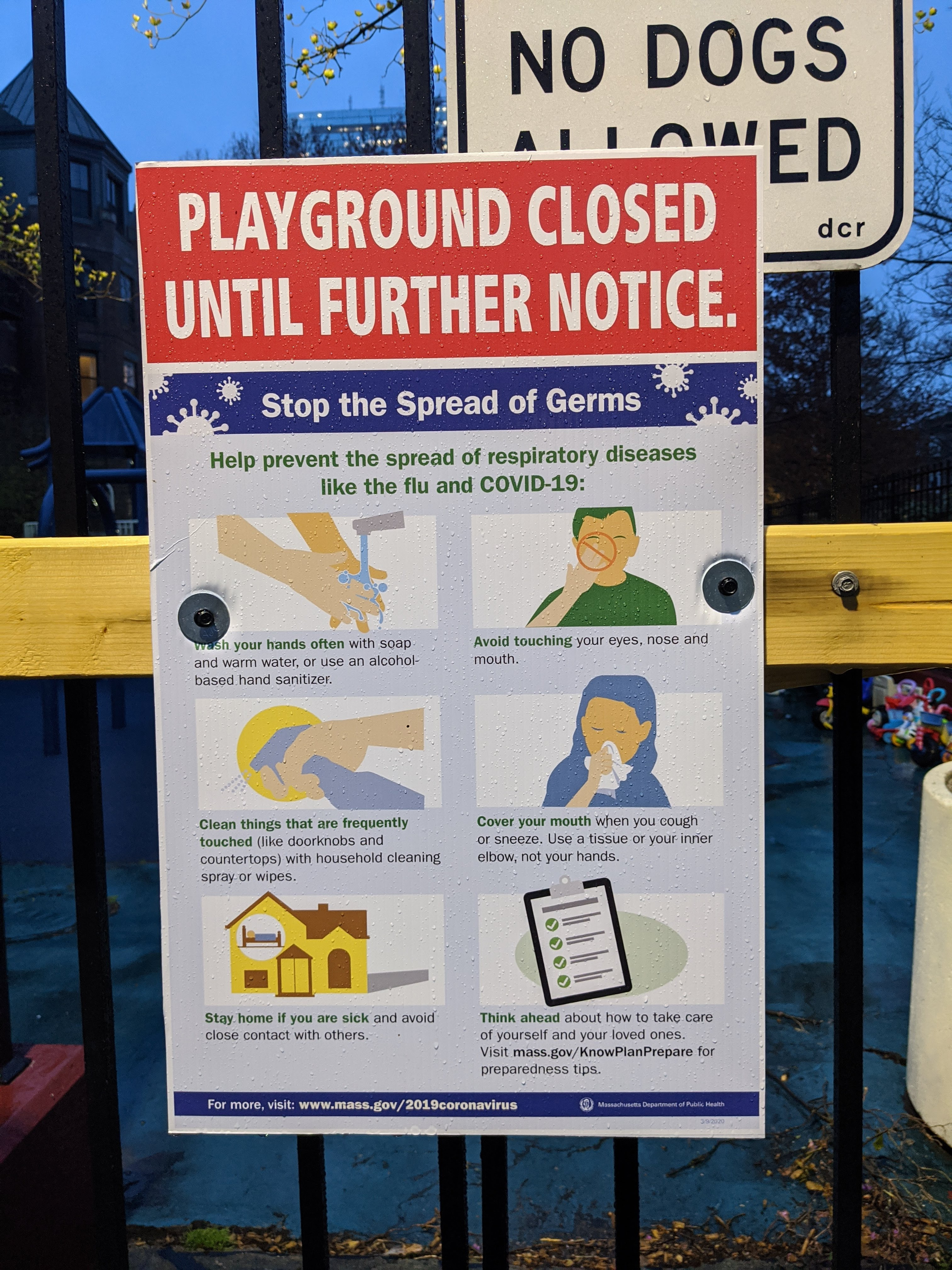
Mayor Marty Walsh announced the closure of all playgrounds until further notice.

On March 10, Massachusetts Governor Charlie Baker declared a state of emergency for the state. On March 15, Mayor Walsh declared a public health emergency due to the spread of COVID-19 in the city. Restaurants and bar rooms were required to reduce capacity, each by at least 50%. On April 27, BPHC extended the public health emergency until further notice.

On March 13, Mayor Walsh announced the closure of all Boston Public Schools. On March 15, Governor Baker closed all schools in the state for three weeks, from March 17 to April 7. On March 25, the Massachusetts school closures were extended to May 4. On April 21, Governor Charlie Baker closed all K-12 schools for the remainder of the school year.

On March 13, the Boston Marathon was postponed to September 14. On May 28, the Boston Marathon was cancelled for the first time in 124 years. Mayor Walsh stated that the Boston Marathon, which usually attracts over 30,000 runners was not feasible in 2020. On May 8, all parades and festivals were suspended to and on Labor Day of 2020.

On March 15, Massachusetts Governor Baker limited gatherings to 25 people. On March 23, the limit on public gatherings was lowered further to 10 people.

On March 16, Mayor Walsh announced the closure of the Boston Public Library. On March 17, Mayor Walsh announced the closure of construction sites. On March 18, Boston closed all playgrounds in the city.

On March 23, Massachusetts Governor Baker issued an order to all employers that do not provide essential services to close. MDPH issued a two-week stay-at-home advisory for all residents through April 7. On March 31, Massachusetts Governor Baker extended both the statewide stay-at-home advisory and the non-essential business closure to May 4. On April 28, Massachusetts Governor Baker extended the statewide stay-at-home advisory and non-essential business closure to May 18.

On April 5, Mayor Walsh encouraged all Boston residents to wear a face mask in public. On May 1, Governor Baker ordered all residents statewide to wear a face covering in public starting May 6, when social distancing is not possible.

On April 5, the Boston Public Health Commission enforced a daily curfew from 9:00 pm to 6:00 pm. On April 29, BPHC extended the nightly curfew in Boston to May 18. On May 16, this curfew was extended indefinitely until further notice. On June 8, the public health emergency enforcing a curfew was lifted by Mayor Walsh, as the city was reopening.

On July 24, Governor Baker announced a new travel restriction for the state, which was to go into effect on August 1. All travelers entering Massachusetts from another state was required to fill out a "Massachusetts Travel Form" and quarantine for 14 days. The originally exempt states were Connecticut, New Hampshire, Rhode Island, Vermont, Maine, Hawaii, New Jersey, and New York. For a state to be exempt, the 7-day average of daily cases was required to be less than 6 per 100,000, and the positive test rate was required to be less than 5%. This order was to be punishable by a $500 fine for each day a traveler was not following the order.

On October 16, Massachusetts state officials loosened travel restrictions amid an uptick in cases. The state changed the threshold for being a lower-risk state to 10 cases per 100,000 people, in a seven-day rolling average. States below that, and a 5% test rate on a 7-day moving average, were to be exempt from the travel order laid out in July. State officials said this would put Massachusetts on standard with other states' COVID-19 travel restrictions. This change added California, Hawaii, New Jersey, and Washington to the list of exempt states.

On August 19, the Massachusetts Department of Public Health announced that all children aged six months and older would need to receive a flu vaccine by December 31, 2020, in order to attend childcare, K–12 schools, and colleges and universities in the state. There is an allowance for medical or religious exemptions, and homeschooled K–12 students or higher education students who are not going on campus will not be required to receive the vaccination.

On October 15, Boston Mayor Walsh announced new COVID-19 enforcement measures in the city amidst a spike in cases. He said that too many violations of COVID-19 restrictions and safety rules have led him to this decision. He mentioned a plan to tighten gathering limits, restrictions on public events, and activities in parks. Walsh stated he was considering fines for violations of these new safety rules. On Wednesday, he partnered with Whittier Street Health Center to open a second mobile testing facility in Nubian Square.

=== Mask supply ===
Secretary of Health and Human Services Marylou Sudders said a shipment of three million masks the state had negotiated to buy from BJ's Wholesale Club, was impounded by the federal government from the Port of New York and New Jersey on March 18. A further order from MSC Industrial Supply for 400 masks to be delivered on March 20 was also claimed by the federal government. Governor Baker reached out to the New England Patriots professional American football team, who used the team plane "AirKraft" to bring approximately 1.2 million N95 masks from China to Boston.

=== Field hospitals and testing sites ===
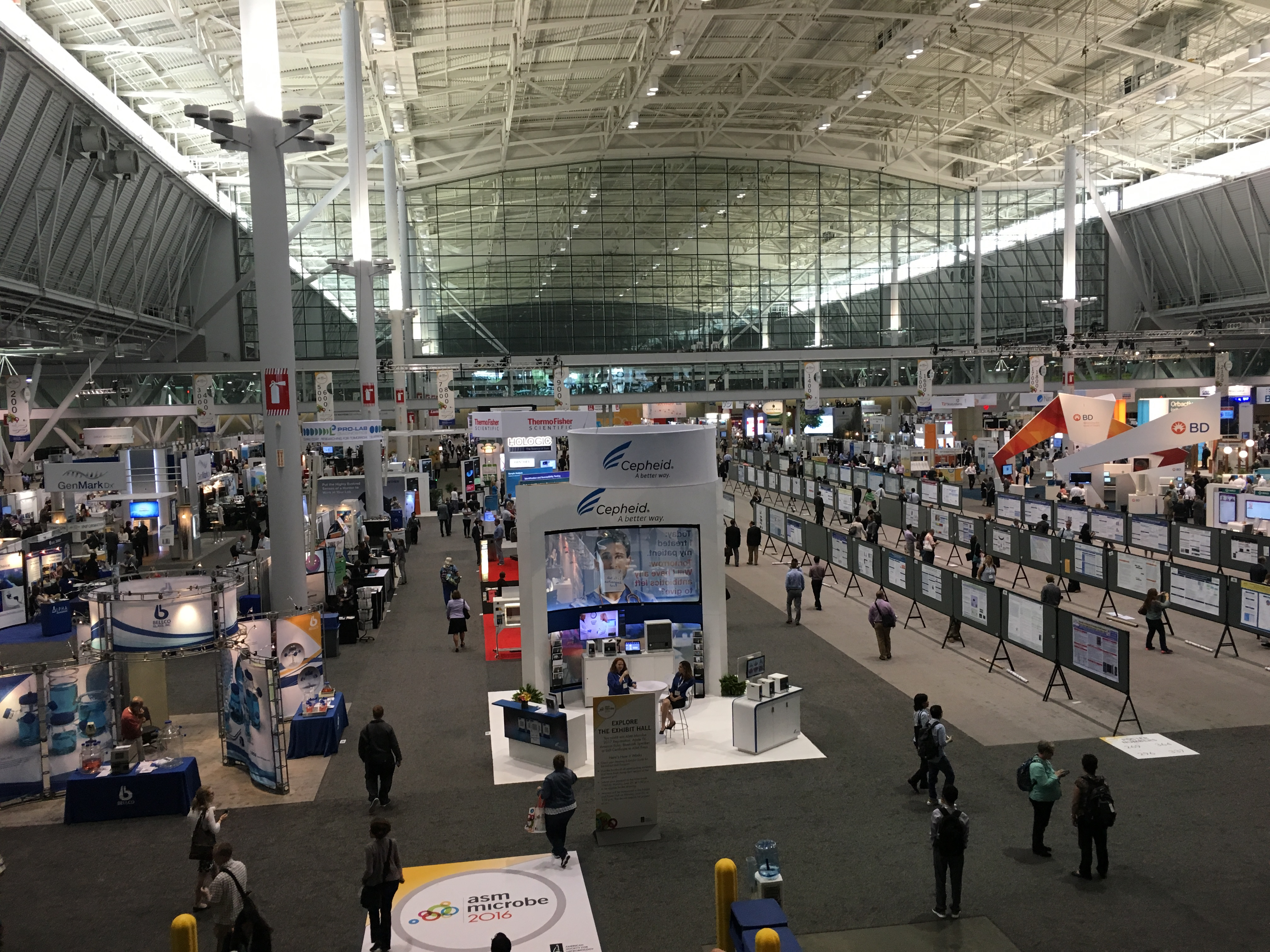
Interior of the Boston Convention and Exhibition Center, pictured during a 2016 conference. The BCEC was converted to a field hospital.

On April 2, Mayor Walsh announced plans to convert the Boston Convention and Exhibition Center (BCEC) into a field hospital with 500 beds assigned to the homeless and 500 beds to accept COVID-19 patients from hospitals. This was the largest field hospital in the state, with the name of Boston Hope. It cost $12 million and consisted of 1,000 single rooms separated by sheetrock walls, of which 200 rooms were equipped with oxygen lines, and six set up with intensive care units. It received its first patient on April 10 and treated some 720 acute-care patients over seven and a half weeks, including homeless people and recuperating COVID-19 patients.

On June 9, Mayor Walsh and the East Boston Neighborhood Health Center set up a new free pop-up testing site in Boston. This testing site was to be open June 10 and June 11 from 12 pm to 7 pm to the general public in Washington Park Mall's parking lot. This particular testing site was to be temporary, situated in the accessible district of Roxbury. Mayor Walsh stated that he wanted to make a highly accessible COVID-19 testing site, for the Boston residents who participated in protests and demonstrations over the murder of George Floyd and Black Lives Matter.

In July and August, many free testing sites were set up in several neighborhoods in Boston, including Charlestown, Mattapan, and Roxbury. This was done in response to CDC's recommendation to expand testing in America.

On October 13, Boston Logan International Airport announced that they would begin offering COVID-19 testing beginning in November. The testing facility was to be set up in Terminal E, offering three types of tests. The facility was to offer a rapid molecular test for $200, a PCR test for $75, and a Blood Antibody test for $75.

=== Reopening ===
On May 13, Governor Baker announced his 4-phase plan for reopening, beginning May 18. He said the four phases would be slow in changing as Massachusetts would slowly resume normal life. He planned for the state to start reopening, then move on to a cautious phase. Then after more months the state would move onto a regulated vigilant state before a vaccine allowed resumption of a new normal. Baker said in any of the first three phases, the state may have to move back a phase. He mentioned that more details were to be stated on May 18.

On May 18, Governor Baker released the details of the plan to reopen businesses in Massachusetts. The plan allows places of worship, essential businesses, manufacturing businesses, and construction sites to reopen with strict restrictions on May 18. Also as of May 18, hospitals and health centers may begin providing urgent preventive care and treatment services to high-risk patients. Baker also announced that people who choose to ride the MBTA will be required to wear masks. Beginning on May 25, additional businesses will be able to open, also with restrictions. Although Baker's plan includes office buildings in the list of businesses allowed to open on May 25, offices within Boston will not be allowed to open until June 1.

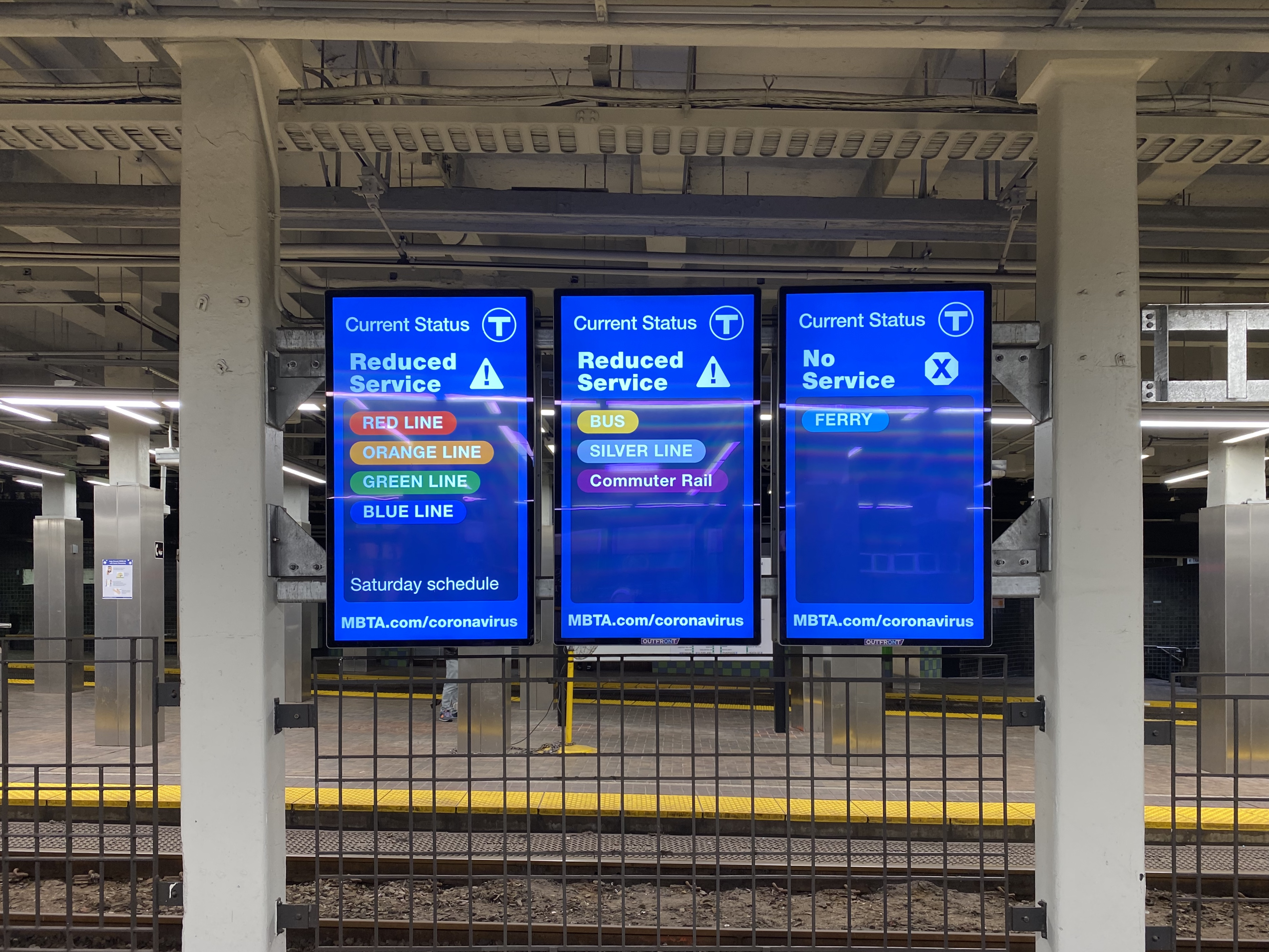
MBTA signs showing coronavirus-related service changes, March 2020

Governor Baker announced on June 6 that Massachusetts would begin entering phase two of the reopening plan starting on June 8, following positive trends in access to testing and decreasing hospitalizations. The first portion of the phase will allow childcare, day camps, lodging retail stores, outdoor seating at restaurants, and children's sports programs to reopen with strict precautions. All professional sports teams would have to be tested for COVID-19 before using any team facilities. Additional services, including indoor dining and nail and tanning salons, will be allowed to reopen at an unspecified later date as a part of phase two if the positive trends in COVID-19 cases continue.

On June 8, the public health emergency enforcing a curfew was lifted by Mayor Walsh, as the city was reopening. On June 12, Boston Public Library announced a new "BPL to Go" program where patrons can place a hold on an item and pick it up safely at a branch library. On June 15, all Boston playgrounds were reopened, as part of Phase 2 of reopening in Massachusetts.

On June 19, Governor Baker stated that Step 2 of Phase 2 of reopening in the state was to begin on June 22. This announcement came following continuous positive trends of COVID-19 statewide. This was to allow nail salons, tanning salons, and indoor dining to reopen statewide. Also, the capacity of which Boston workplaces were to reduce to was raised from 25% to 50%, in all workplaces in Boston. Governor Baker advised residents to still keep precautions as the virus was still not eradicated.

Although Governor Baker was still looking at the data in the state, he announced his plan for Phase 3 of reopening in the state on June 30. Phase 3 was to allow museums, fitness centers, moderate-size movie theaters, overnight youth camps, sports for all ages, and indoor recreational facilities to open with restrictions remaining in place. Governor Baker announced that Massachusetts may move into Phase 3 as early as July 6. On July 2, the state confirmed that Step 1 of Phase 3 of reopening was allowed to start on July 6, in all of Massachusetts except for Boston, which was to start Phase 3 one week later, on July 13. On July 13, the City of Boston decided to include the casino Encore Boston Harbor for reopening during Phase 3, with temperature screening upon entry and masks being mandatory.

On August 7, Massachusetts Governor Baker took steps to slow and pause reopening in the state. He reduced the outdoor gathering limit from 100 to 50 people, started requiring masks at private gatherings of 10 or more people from different households, authorized state police to start issuing fines to event hosts, and created the COVID Enforcement and Intervention Team for operations in high-risk communities. The state was to postpone Step 2 of Phase 3 of reopening indefinitely, which would have allowed higher-contact sports and small theater and music venues to operate indoors. To prevent "bars masquerading as restaurants" he required that alcoholic beverages be accompanied by food in restaurants.

On September 29, Governor Baker announced that communities in the state classified by the state as "lower risk" would be allowed to move into Step 2 of Phase 3 of the state's reopening plan beginning on October 5. This step was to include allowing both indoor and outdoor performance venues to open at 50% capacity (up to 250 people); fitting rooms to open in retail stores; and gyms, museums, libraries, and driving and flight schools to increase capacity to 50%. At the time, Boston had been considered a "red zone" community, meaning they were to remain at Step 1 of Phase 3 of reopening. Mayor Walsh warned the public in late September that Boston was approaching red zone in terms of COVID-19. Not long after, the state classified Boston as a red zone community.

=== Prevention measures ===
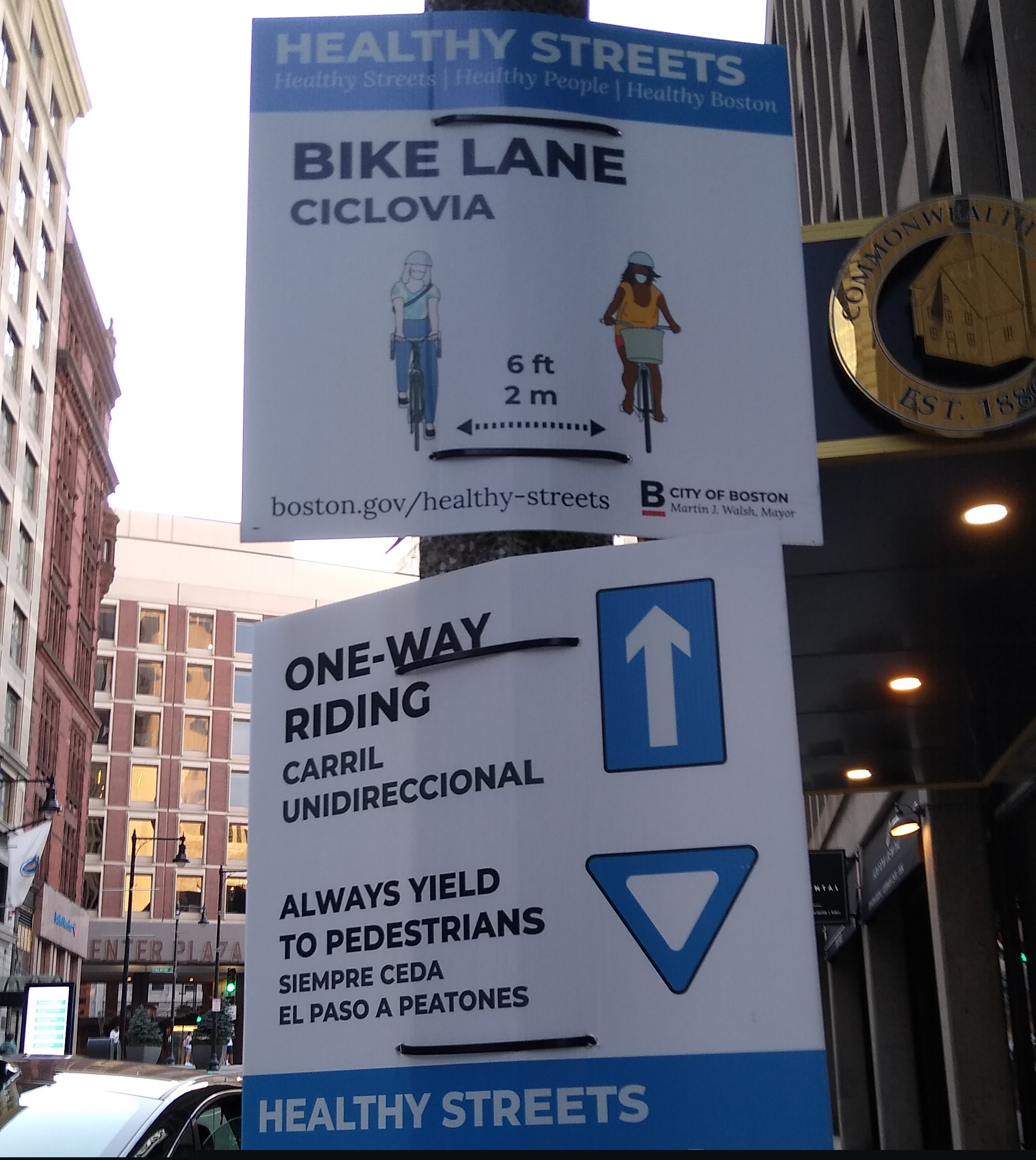
A sign in Boston explaining the Healthy Streets plan

On May 28, Mayor Walsh announced a new "healthy streets" program to promote social distancing in the roads of Boston. Mayor Walsh announced that many bus stops would be expanded and bike lanes would be built fast, to allow social distancing for bikes. The city would also be supporting small businesses in Boston. The city will help expand outdoor seating for restaurants, to further allow social distancing. This would be implemented with transportation barriers, to allow more space.

On May 29, the Mayor Walsh released a "return to workplace framework" to safely reopen businesses and workplaces. Social distancing of 6 feet was to be enforced. Workplaces were to reduce capacity to 25% of their original capacity before COVID-19. All workplaces were required to ensure access to handwashing facilities on site, including soap and running water. Workplaces were to avoid sharing office materials. Cleaning and disinfecting frequently were to be enforced in all workplaces and businesses in Boston. In businesses, customers were to social distance inside the business as well as outside. Masks were to be required from all employees and customers, in all workplaces and businesses in Boston.

=== Vaccine policies ===
In March 2021, Boston's acting mayor Kim Janey announced the Vaccine Equity Grant Initiative, which she worked to launch with the city's Office of Health and Human Services and Boston Public Health Commission. The program was aimed to increase awareness of and access to the COVID-19 vaccine in communities disproportionately impacted by the COVID-19 pandemic. The announcement of this program was her first announcement after becoming acting mayor. In April, Janey and Boston's health and human services chief Marty Martinez announced the Boston Public Health Commission's "Hope" campaign, a multilingual public awareness campaign aiming to encourage Boston's residents to get vaccinated against COVID-19.

In early August, Acting Mayor Janey controversially compared requiring proof of vaccination (vaccine passports) to slave papers and birtherism. She walked back this comparison days later. On August 12, Janey announced a mandate that all municipal employees either needed to be vaccinated for COVID-19 or undergo regular COVID-19 tests. In October, Janey threatened that she might fire municipal employees who did not abide by this mandate. However, despite August 2021 calls by her 2021 Boston mayoral election opponents City Councilor Andrea Campbell and City Councilor Michelle Wu, amid rising delta variant infections, Janey refused to implement a COVID-19 vaccine requirement for entrance to indoor establishments, such as restaurants and gyms.

In December 2021, Janey's elected successor Mayor Michelle Wu announced a city COVID-19 vaccine mandate. Under the mandate, people ages 12 and older, in order to enter indoor public venues (bars, restaurants, gyms, theaters, and sports venues) in Boston, were required to show proof of at least their first COVID-19 vaccine dose by January 15, 2022, and of full vaccination by February 15, 2022. The mandate promoted opposition, and in an interview with Boston Public Radio, Wu stated that she received racist messages in response to vaccine requirements. Some opponents circulated false rumors about Wu being hospitalized for panic attacks while in office. On February 19, 2022, Wu announced that the city would end its proof-of-vaccine mandate for public places with immediate effect.

The Wu administration also required city employees to be vaccinated against COVID-19 (with exceptions for employees with medical reasons and religious objectors), and about 94% of city employees were in compliance with that requirement by late January 2022. Wu extended the deadline for city employees to comply. Some public employee unions fought the mandate in court, arguing that the mandate rules should be subject to collective bargaining. A Massachusetts Appeals Court judge sided with the unions, blocking the city worker mandate. Wu faced persistent demonstrations outside of her house protesting her COVID measures.

=== Municipal eviction moratorium and other housing payment policy ===
In late August 2021, after the United States Supreme Court overturned the federal eviction moratorium, Acting Mayor Janey announced a municipal moratorium, which would remain in effect indefinitely until the executive director of the Boston Public Health Commission rescinded it. It banned landlords and homeowners from serving or enforcing evictions on city residents, except in cases which involve, "serious violations of the terms of the tenancy that impair the health and safety of other building residents or immediately adjacent neighbors." At the same time, Janey announced that she would direct the Department of Neighborhood Development to use $5 million of federal pandemic relief funds to create a "Foreclosure Prevention Fund" to help homeowners behind on payment to cover their expenses.

== Societal effects ==
=== Food supplies and supermarkets ===
Panic buying, especially since March 11, led to shortages of some products, as well as causing crowds at grocery stores as early in the day as 7:00 a.m. Pandemic supplies like sanitizing supplies and masks remained difficult to get for weeks. Grocery retailers, as required by state law, offered older and more vulnerable people a time in the early morning when they could shop separately. Later, emergency orders required grocery stores to implement stricter measures, including limiting the number of people allowed inside stores at a time, and marking queues to maintain social distancing. They installed plastic guards to reduce contact between customers and cashiers, and designated some aisles one-way. By the end of May, grocery stores started expanding hours, with toilet paper back on shelves, but home baking supplies like yeast and flour in low quantity.

The Greater Boston Food Bank said that it experienced double the normal demand for food, distributing more food per month than it ever had before. It also said that because food donations from restaurants and grocery stores plummeted, it was spending about 50 times as much money to buy food, though the Massachusetts government provided cash assistance, and the federal government provided surplus food purchased from farmers (the Coronavirus Food Assistance Program).

=== Schools and universities ===
==== Spring 2020 ====
School closures began in early March, when Massachusetts Institute of Technology announced on March 9 that it was moving to online-only classes for the remainder of the spring semester. Northeastern University, which had already closed their satellite campuses in San Francisco and Seattle, hesitated to close their main campus for fear of international students losing their F visa status. On March 6 the university publicly called on the Department of Homeland Security to grant clemency for international students so the university could close.

On March 10, Harvard University announced that its classes would be online-only for the rest of the spring semester. The University of Massachusetts Boston informed faculty that they should prepare to teach remotely.

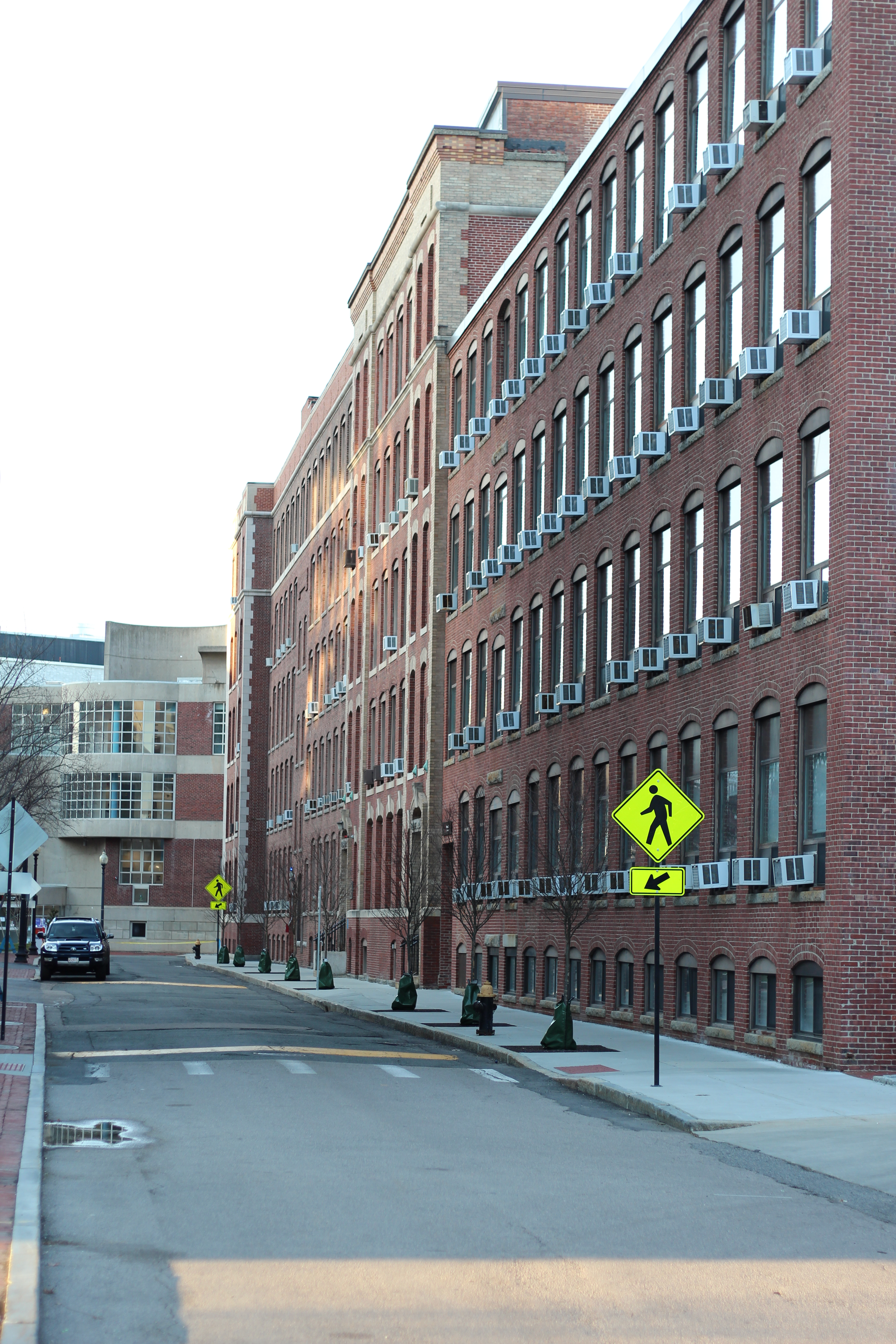
Empty Leon Street in Boston due to the COVID-19 pandemic, March 2020

On March 11, Northeastern University and Boston University moved all classes online. On March 14, Northeastern University informed students they would need to vacate their dormitories by 5:00 p.m. on March 17. Up to this point students were taking online classes but allowed to remain on university property. Boston College moved all classes online, and all students were told to vacate their dorms by March 15.

On March 13, Boston Mayor Walsh announced that Boston Public Schools would be closed starting on March 17 until April 27. On March 15, Governor Baker ordered all schools in Massachusetts closed for three weeks from March 17 through April 7. On March 25, he extended the closing through May 4. On April 21, he extended it to the remainder of the school year.

==== Fall 2020 ====
On August 1, Mayor Walsh announced that Boston Public Schools would not return to 100% in-person learning even if in-class learning would resume in the fall. He stated that students would participate in a hybrid of in-school and remote learning. He also gave parents the option to have their children learn 100% remotely.

On August 21, Mayor Walsh announced that Boston Public Schools would begin the school year 100% remotely before transitioning into a hybrid model. "On September 21st — one month from today — all students will begin with remote learning," he said. "The first students will not return to our classrooms until October 1st." The BPS superintendent and Mayor Walsh formed a 4-phase return to a hybrid model. On October 1, the students with the highest needs were to return. On October 15 and 19, K0, K1, and K2 students were to return. On October 22 and 26, grades 1–3 were to go back to the classroom. On November 5 and 9, grades 4–8 were to return to the classroom. On November 16 and 19, grades 9–12 were to return.

On October 7, Boston delayed the next phase of in-person learning to October 22 in Boston Public Schools, in response to an uptick in cases. The positive test rate in the city had increased to 4.1%, prompting city officials to put a pause on moving forward with in-person learning. High-needs students were to continue in-person learning. Both Boston officials and the Boston Teachers Union agreed with this decision. They plan to keep the remainder of the phases the same, over the course of October and November. On October 16, in-person learning was further delayed to October 29.

Some colleges in Boston began moving students in to dorms in mid-August. By late-August, students were beginning to move in to on-campus housing at Boston University in Boston.

On September 10, Governor Baker said he "couldn't imagine a reason" to not go back to in-person or hybrid learning in the state's green and white communities in terms of spread in COVID-19. However, he has been encouraging communities in the yellow and red zones to stick with remote learning. He noted that not all cities and towns were following that guidance. Communities in the red zone, such as Chatham, had begun or were planning to resume in-person learning. Governor Baker instructed the town to continue remote learning.

By mid-September, Boston College began seeing a significant spike in COVID-19 cases. About a dozen cases in August had turned into an outbreak in the swimming teams at the college. Mayor Walsh said this outbreak is a "serious matter" and that he had been communicating with state officials. Also, Boston officials asked BC to begin contact tracing. The college was reported to have agreed.

=== Sports and recreation ===
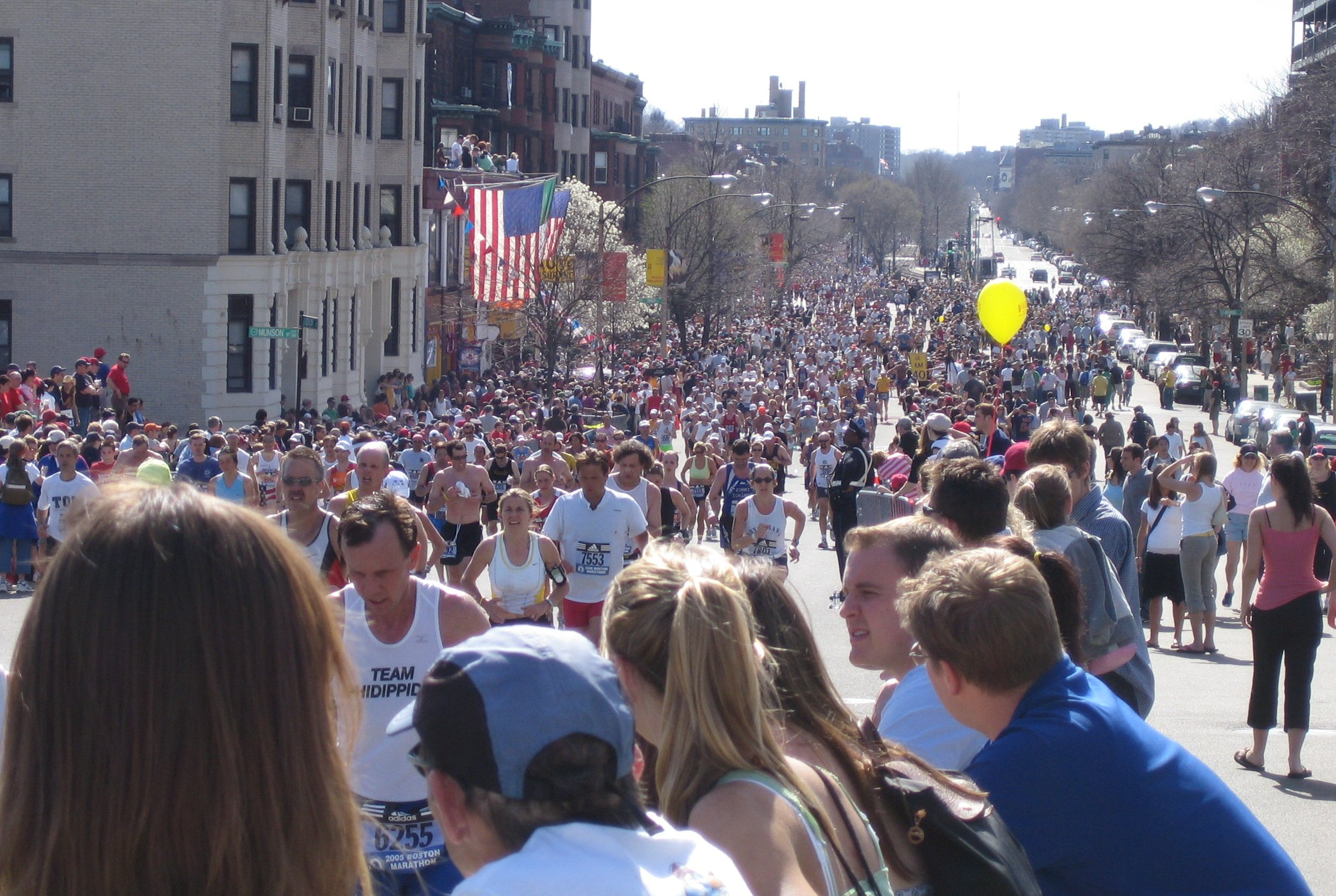
The Boston Marathon, pictured in 2005, was cancelled in 2020 by Mayor Walsh

Several leagues began postponing or suspending their sports seasons starting March 12, and Major League Baseball canceled the remainder of spring training. On March 16, after the CDC recommended restricting events of more than 50 people for the next eight weeks, the major league baseball season was postponed indefinitely. Also on March 12, the National Basketball Association announced the season would be suspended for 30 days. The National Hockey League season was suspended indefinitely. Boston Celtics player Marcus Smart announced on March 18 that he had tested positive for COVID-19, having been tested five days prior.

In college sports, the National Collegiate Athletic Association canceled all winter and spring tournaments, most notably the Division I men's and women's basketball tournaments, affecting colleges and universities statewide.

The Boston Athletic Association canceled the 2020 Boston Marathon on May 28. In March they had postponed the race, which usually takes place in April, until September. However, Boston Mayor Walsh said on May 28, "There's no way to hold this usual race format without bringing large numbers of people into close proximity. While our goal and our hope was to make progress in containing the virus and recovering our economy, this kind of event would not be responsible or realistic on September 14 or any time this year." 2020 was the first year in the race's 124-year history that the event was postponed or canceled. Runners will still be able to participate "virtually" in September, and will receive a medal and other items if they send proof that they complete the race in under six hours. Those who qualified for the 2020 marathon will be eligible to compete in the 2021 race.

On June 12, the Boston Bruins team announced that one of their players had tested positive for COVID-19. Phase 2 of the reopening plan required all Bruins players to be tested before using any team facilities. The team was told that the player, whose identity remains confidential, was asymptomatic so far.

On July 21, the Massachusetts Interscholastic Athletic Association's Board of Directors voted to delay the start of the fall sports season until September 14. This decision was made in compliance with state guidelines for K-12 sports in the state.

On October 8, Boston College announced that they were cancelling 5 field hockey games after a player contracted the virus. This prompted all other team players to go through a process of contact tracing. Once done, they were ordered to quarantine for 14 days.

On October 11, a New England Patriots facility was shut down after a player tested positive for the virus. The team was supposed to play Denver on Monday, but the game was postponed. ESPN reported that this was the team's fourth case within 8 days.

=== Traffic and transit ===
The sudden surge of cases in Boston during the week of March 9 led many organizations to ask employees to work from home, and prompted museums and libraries to close. This led to a noticeable decline in Boston's rush hour traffic; in some cases, drive times for major highways dropped by 30 to 50 percent.

Following the beginning of reopening Massachusetts on May 18, the Greater Boston Area began to see the return of severe traffic congestion during rush hour, especially seen on the Southeast Expressway. Concerns were raised with the MBTA's response to coronavirus, with worsening traffic congestion. 14 miles of bus lanes was added for MBTA buses in late 2020, with the statement that the pandemic has helped move things along. The possibility of significant, permanent, service cuts and fare hikes on the MBTA was raised, with a significant shortfall of revenue due to COVID-19 and uncertainty of state and federal relief, and its impact on low income riders and rush hour traffic. A need to look at route by route and surveying employers would be used in determining service changes after COVID-19.

In October, various proposals of service cuts across the transit system was presented to the agency's governing board, which public transit advocates warned of devastation. Various proposals included ending subway and commuter rail service earlier in the evening at 9 pm, closure of various stations, and elimination of midday and weekend transit service. These service cuts would affect two thirds of bus service, all rail service, and ferries. The changes would go into effect in spring 2021.

== Statistics ==
The data in these charts are recorded by the date the test result was recorded, not the day the test was administered. This may result in backlog in the charts on a few days.

View source data.

=== Weekly % COVID-19 like illness in ED ===
Weekly percentage COVID-19 like illness in Emergency Department:

View source data.

== See also ==
- COVID-19 pandemic in Massachusetts - for impact on the state
- COVID-19 pandemic in the United States - for impact on the country
- COVID-19 pandemic - for impact on other countries
