= Boston Sports Megaplex =

The Boston Sports Megaplex was a sports megaplex that was proposed in the mid-1990s to replace Fenway Park, Foxboro Stadium, and create a new convention center.

== History ==
The proposed sites for this hybrid convention center-stadium were Summer Street in South Boston or at the so-called Crosstown site along Melnea Cass Boulevard in Roxbury, adjacent to Boston's South End. Ultimately, the administration of Massachusetts Governor William Weld pushed for construction of a full "Megaplex" at the crosstown site, with Boston Mayor Thomas Menino favoring construction of a new, stand-alone convention center in South Boston. Ultimately, the residents of neither of these neighborhoods wanted a stadium, thus Menino backed out fearing it would affect his chance at re-election. The Fenway Park plan was cancelled after many "Save Fenway Park!" groups popped up to save the historic ballpark.

Ultimately, Fenway replacement plans were cancelled, the New England Patriots constructed a replacement stadium right next to Foxboro Stadium, and the Boston Convention and Exhibition Center was built near the waterfront. Many theories abound as to why the plan failed, but many factors have been deemed as being responsible.
