= Boston Convention and Exhibition Center =

Largest exhibition center in the Northeast US

Thomas Michael Menino Convention and Exhibition Center
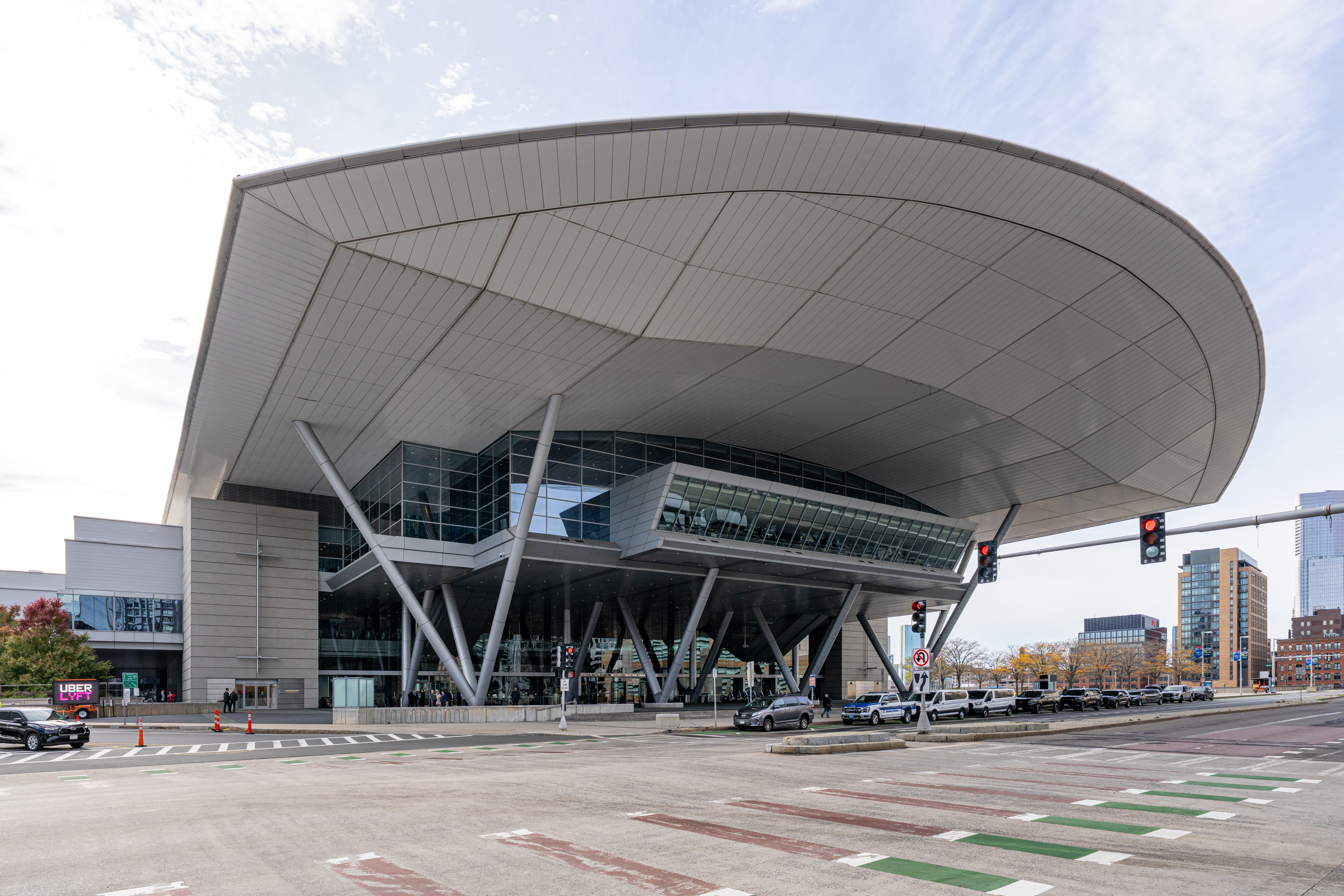
- Interactive map of Thomas Michael Menino Convention and Exhibition Center
- Address: 415 Summer Street; Boston, MA, 02210; United States
- Coordinates: 42°20′44.84″N 71°02′45.28″W
- Owner: Massachusetts Convention Center Authority (MCCA)
- Operator: MCCA
- Public transit: Silver Line World Trade Center

Construction
- Opened: June 2004
- Construction cost: $850 million

Website
- www.signatureboston.com/bcec/

The Thomas Michael Menino Convention and Exhibition Center, formerly known as the Boston Convention and Exhibition Center (BCEC), is an exhibition center in Boston, Massachusetts, United States. The building is among the largest exhibition centers in the Northeastern United States, with approximately 516,000 square feet (47,900 m^{2}) of contiguous exhibition space. The main exhibition floor comprises three bays which can be isolated for separate shows or linked into one large space. The center is located on Summer Street near the South Boston waterfront, Boston's World Trade Center. It is about one block south of the World Trade Center station on the Silver Line of the Massachusetts Bay Transportation Authority (MBTA).

== History ==
In 1997, Robert Kraft, the owner of the National Football League's New England Patriots, and Massport, a state government agency that runs airports and sea ports, tried unsuccessfully to build on the lot the South Boston Sports Megaplex, which included a new home stadium for the football team to replace Foxboro Stadium. Opposition came from, among others, the surrounding neighborhoods because of concerns about traffic. (In 2002, the New England Patriots opened a new stadium, Gillette Stadium, in Foxborough, Massachusetts.)

The push for a new convention center in Boston came in the late 1990s when the semi-annual Macworld Conference and Expo, previously held in Boston each summer, moved to the Jacob Javits Convention Center in New York City. It was believed that this move was in part because no single Boston venue could contain the entire show. The center has been controversial because it is located in the South Boston Seaport, which is some distance from the main concentration of hotels in Boston. However several new hotels have been planned or built near the convention center. The Massachusetts State Legislature authorized the BCEC under chapter 152 of the Acts of 1997, which also provided for redevelopment of the Springfield Massachusetts Convention Center in Springfield, MA among other actions designed to balance the impact across the state. Chapter 152 authorized the acquisition by eminent domain of approximately 60 acres (0.24 km^{2}) of land in the Seaport area of Boston. A subsequent conflict with local politicians resulted in a change of the name of the area to the South Boston Waterfront. The Project was a joint venture of the Boston Redevelopment Authority and the Massachusetts Convention Center Authority, who employed Tishman Construction as its owner's representative on the project. The new convention center was designed by Rafael Viñoly Architects, New York City, in association with The HNTB Companies, Boston. It opened in June, 2004.

That summer, Macworld returned to Boston as the BCEC's first trade show, but the show's reduced size, due in part to lack of participation by Apple, relegated its 2005 meeting (its last) to the smaller Hynes Convention Center in Boston's Back Bay.

The Westin Boston Waterfront hotel opened next door the BCEC in June 2006. In 2007, the convention center saw over 1.6 million attendees booking over 1 million hotel roomnights. This equates to an economic impact of over $890 million, according to the Massachusetts Convention Center Authority's 2007 Annual Report.

The New England Auto Show, long a staple for the Bayside Expo Center in the Dorchester section of Boston, moved to the new BCEC and signed on through 2009. This show is expected to bring in 90,000 attendees to the convention center. Also in 2007, the BCEC was awarded the 2007 Convention Center of the Year at the Event Solutions Spotlight Awards. Other big shows in 2007 were AIIM/On Demand, the Yankee Dental Congress, and eBay! Live. MCCA proposed expansion in 2007.

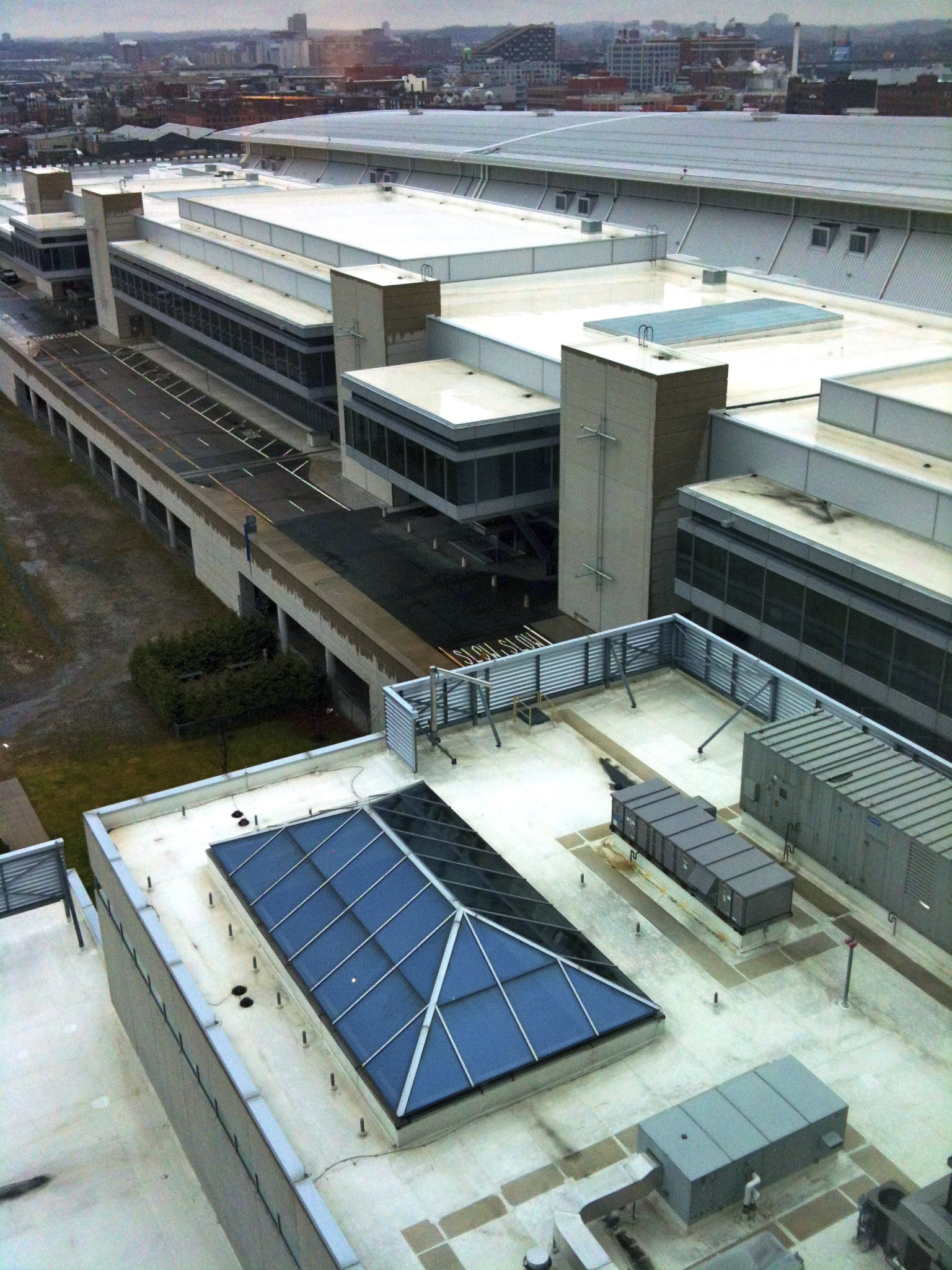
Boston Convention and Exhibition Center in 2012

In 2009, the Massachusetts Convention Center Authority launched the "Top 5 Campaign", aiming to make Boston one of the top five cities in North America for conventions. The initiative recommended increasing the number of local hotel rooms. PAX moved its eastern show to the convention hall in 2010.

In 2011, the Authority sought approval for a $2 billion expansion. In 2012, the large Biotechnology Industry Organization conference said it would not return as scheduled in 2018 without more capacity.

In the 2010s, a new Indigo Line was proposed by Governor Deval Patrick, using diesel multiple units (DMUs), to connect the BCEC to Back Bay Station and the many hotels there. Funding for DMUs was cut by Governor Charlie Baker, and Track 61 was instead converted to test newly manufactured trains for the MBTA Red Line.

In April 2020, the Convention center was set up as a 1,000 bed alternate care site for COVID-19 patients as part of the government response to the COVID-19 pandemic in Boston, which had also eliminated demand for conferences.

In 2022, governor Charlie Baker proposed selling the Hynes Convention Center and investing the proceeds in the BCEC.

In July 2025, the Boston Convention and Exhibition Center was renamed to The Thomas Michael Menino Convention and Exhibition Center, after former Boston mayor Thomas Menino.

== Gallery ==
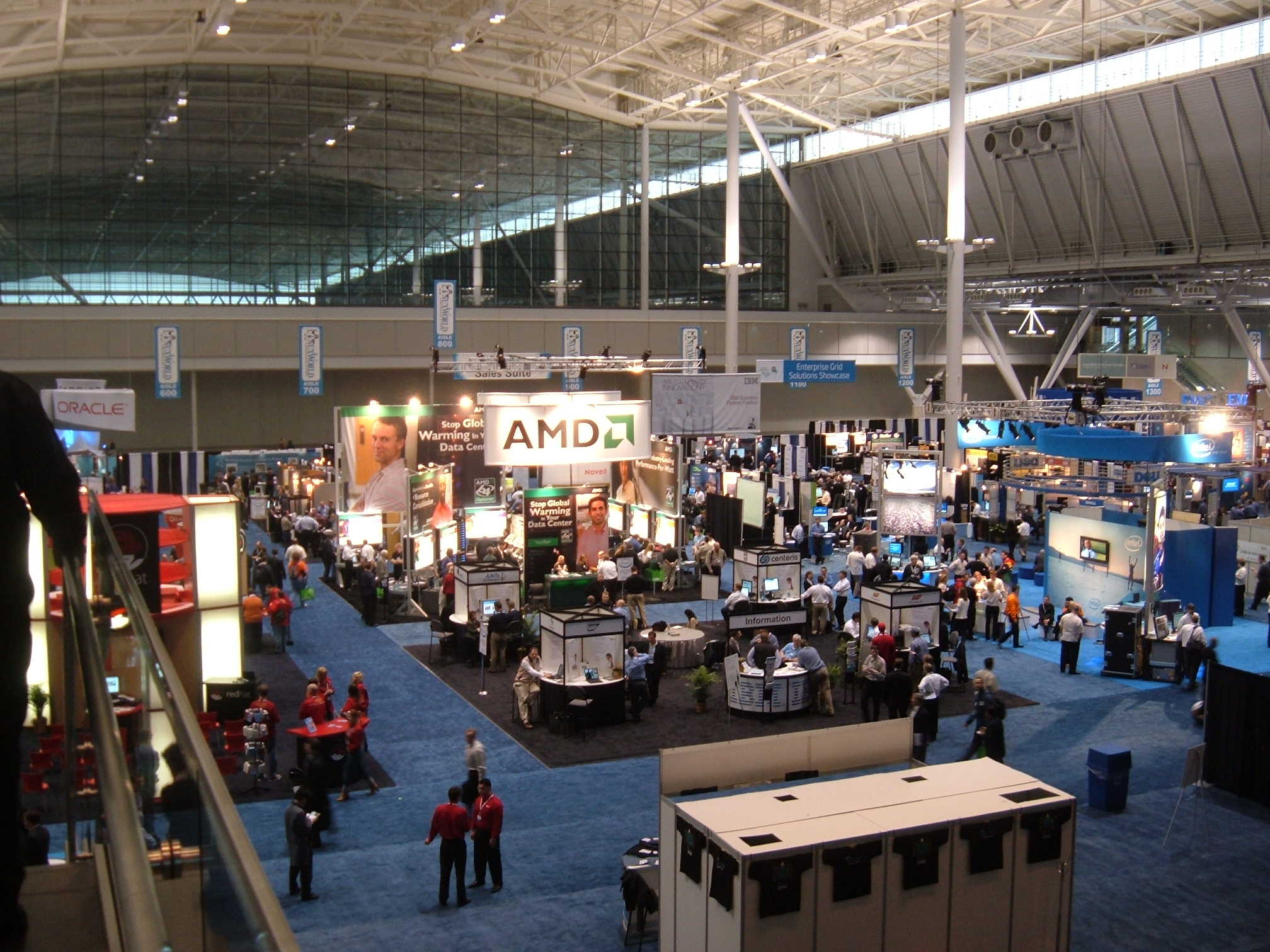
The 2006 LinuxWorld trade show filled about 2/3 of the north bay at BCEC.

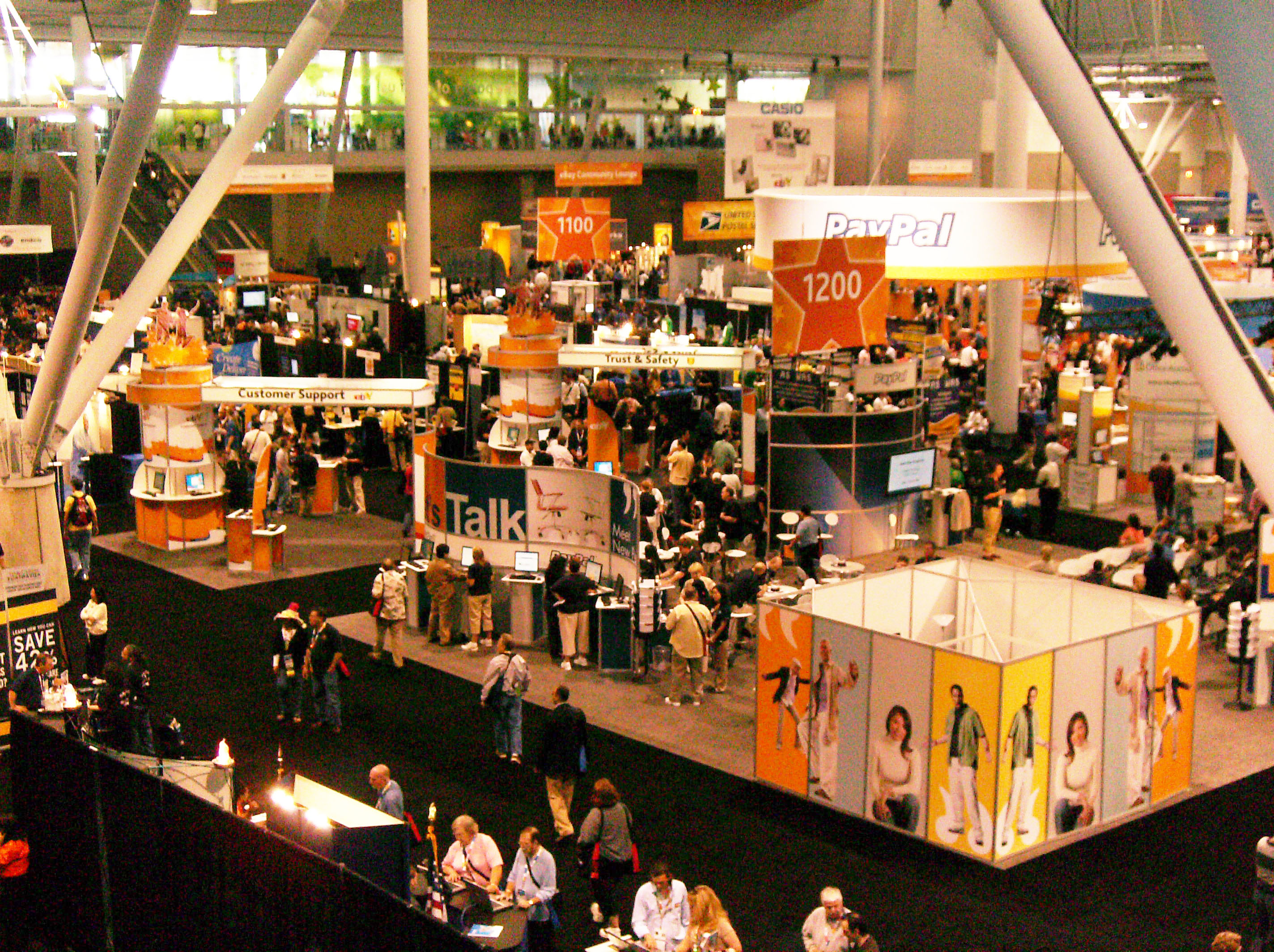
The 2007 eBay Live trade show filled BCEC.

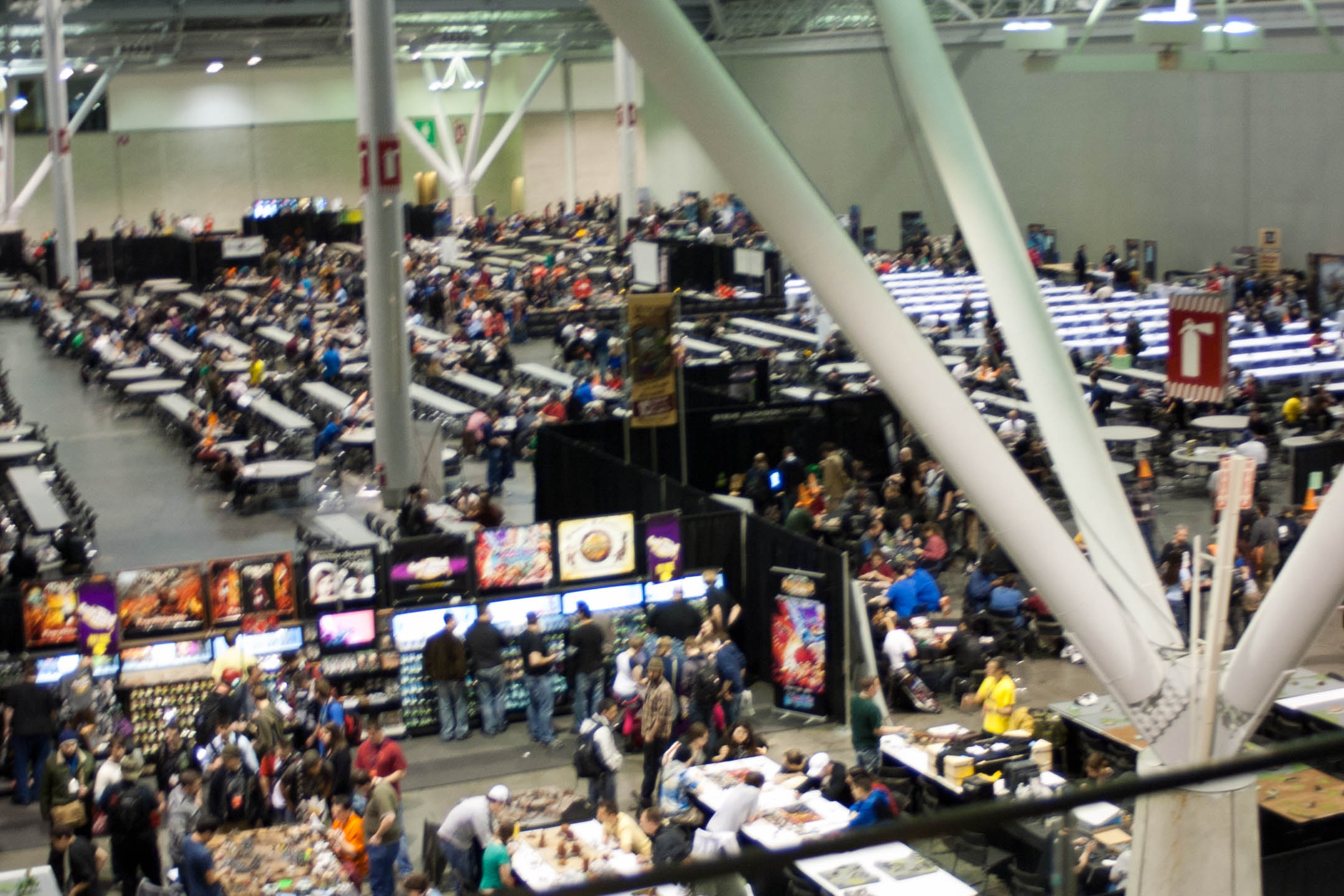
The 2011 PAX East

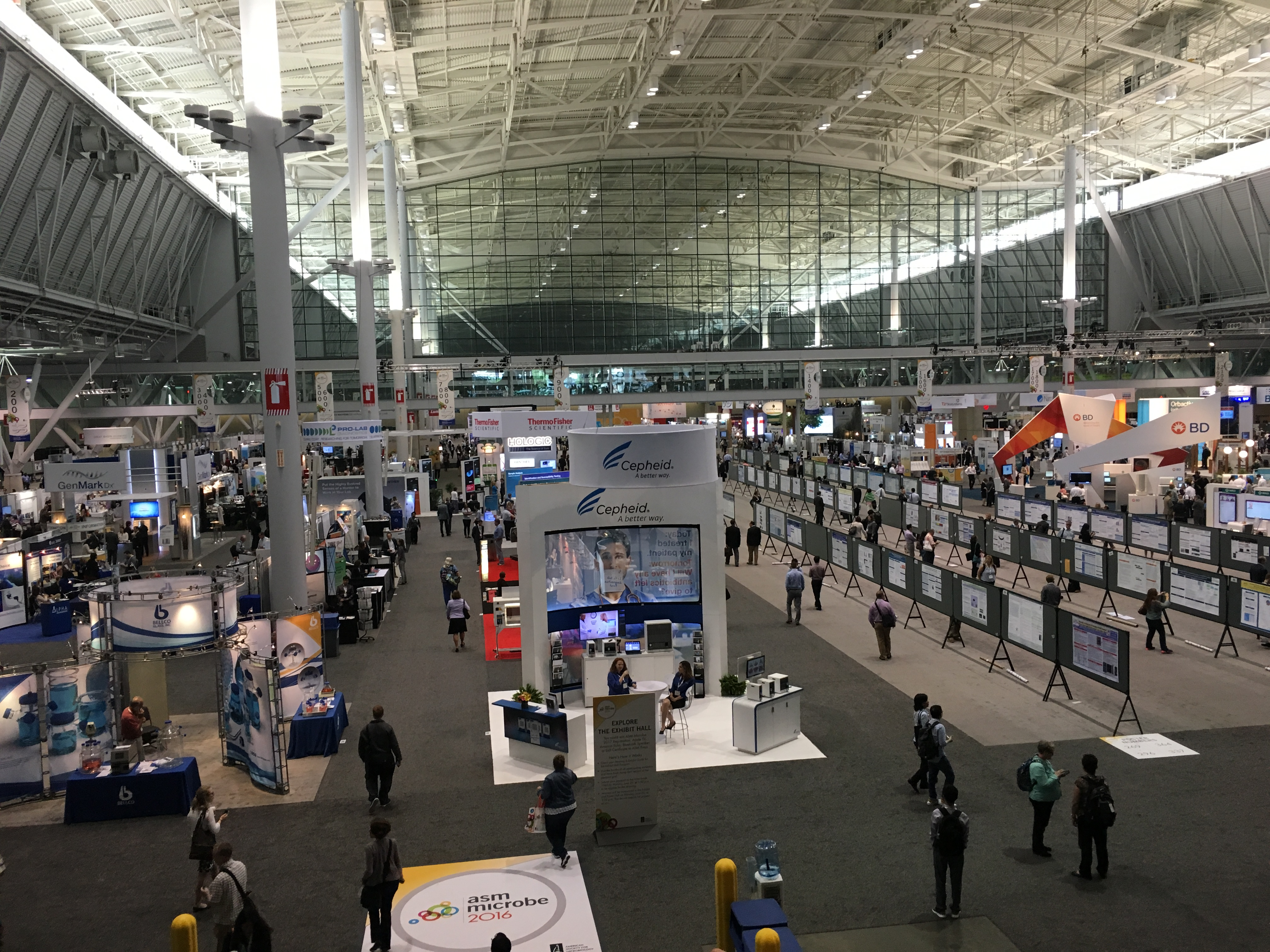
American Society for Microbiology show 2016

== See also ==
- List of convention centers in the United States
