= COVID-19 pandemic in Massachusetts =

- Disease: COVID-19
- Pathogen: SARS-CoV-2
- Location: Massachusetts, U.S.
- First outbreak: Wuhan, Hubei, China
- Index case: Boston
- Arrival date: 1 February 2020; 6 years ago
- Confirmed cases: 1,305,830 (cumulative) as of January 13
- Hospitalized cases: 3,180 (current) as of January 13
- Critical cases: 484 (current) as of January 13
- Ventilator cases: 278 (current) as of January 13
- Deaths: 20,872 (cumulative) as of January 13
- Vaccinations: 6,316,365 (91.6%) (people with at least one dose) as of January 7; 5,171,673 (75.0%) (fully vaccinated people) as of January 7

Government website
- https://mass.gov/covid19

COVID-19 pandemic medical cases in Massachusetts by county
County (Note: County where an individual with a positive case was diagnosed. Location of original infection may vary.)	Confirmed Cases (Note: Reported cases include just confirmed cases. Probable cases are not included.)	Deaths (Note: Deaths include deaths from probable and confirmed cases.)	Population (Note: July 2019 population estimate from "U.S. Census Bureau Quick Facts: Massachusetts". United States Census Bureau.)	Cases /100k	Deaths /100k	Deaths /Case %
14 / 14	1,305,830	20,872	6,892,503	18,945.7	302.8	1.6
Barnstable	29,131	577	212,990	13,677.2	270.9	1.98
Berkshire	16,727	351	124,944	13,387.6	280.9	2.1
Bristol	126,457	2,144	565,217	22,373.2	379.3	1.7
Dukes and Nantucket	5,701	7	28,731	19,842.7	24.4	0.12
Essex	180,115	2,817	789,034	22,827.3	357	1.56
Franklin	7,252	138	70,180	10,333.4	196.6	1.9
Hampden	109,174	1,814	466,372	23,409.2	389	1.66
Hampshire	19,784	361	160,830	12,301.2	224.5	1.82
Middlesex	267,670	4,222	1,611,699	16,607.9	262	1.58
Norfolk	109,169	1,998	706,775	15,446.1	282.7	1.83
Plymouth	98,872	1,727	521,202	18,970	331.3	1.75
Suffolk	176,203	2,051	803,907	21,918.3	255.1	1.16
Worcester	157,497	2,658	830,622	18,961.3	320	1.69
Unknown	2,078	7	n/a	n/a	n/a	0.34
Updated January 13, 2022; Data is publicly reported by Massachusetts Department of Public Health

The COVID-19 pandemic in Massachusetts was part of a pandemic of coronavirus disease 2019 (COVID-19) in the U.S. state of Massachusetts. The first confirmed case was reported on February 1, 2020, and the number of cases began increasing rapidly on March 5. Governor Charlie Baker declared a state of emergency on March 10. By March 12, more than a hundred people had tested positive for the virus. Massachusetts experienced a first wave of COVID-19 that peaked in late April 2020, with almost 4,000 people hospitalized with the disease, and a rolling seven-day average of 2,300 new confirmed cases and 175 confirmed deaths a day. A second wave began in the autumn of the same year and peaked in January 2021, seeing higher daily case numbers but fewer deaths and hospitalizations than the first wave. There was a smaller third spike of increased cases and hospitalizations in March and April 2021, which resulted in significantly fewer deaths than the first two waves. A fourth wave began in July and August 2021. Another wave occurred in the winter of 2021 to 2022, coinciding with the emergence of the SARS-CoV-2 Omicron variant in the state, and exceeding the peak number of cases in any previous wave. As of January 13, 2022, Massachusetts was experiencing a rolling average of 13,314 new confirmed cases and 43 confirmed deaths per day. (Note: The state reports the rolling average of confirmed cases per day based on seven days of data ending at the previous day, and the rolling average of confirmed deaths per day based on seven days of data ending two days prior.)

As of January 13, 2022, Massachusetts had the third-highest number of reported cases per capita out of U.S. states over the previous seven-day period, with 2,416.4 cases per 100,000 people. It had the 14th-highest number of deaths per capita over the same period, with 5.4 deaths per 100,000 people. There had been 1,411,613 total reported COVID-19 cases and 20,872 reported deaths among cases of COVID-19 in Massachusetts since the beginning of the pandemic. The state had tested more than 10 million people for the virus via molecular test, and more than 1.8 million via antigen test. As of January 7, 2022, 91.6% of people in Massachusetts had received at least one dose of a COVID-19 vaccine, and 75.0% were fully vaccinated.

== Timeline ==
=== 2020 ===
==== February–March ====
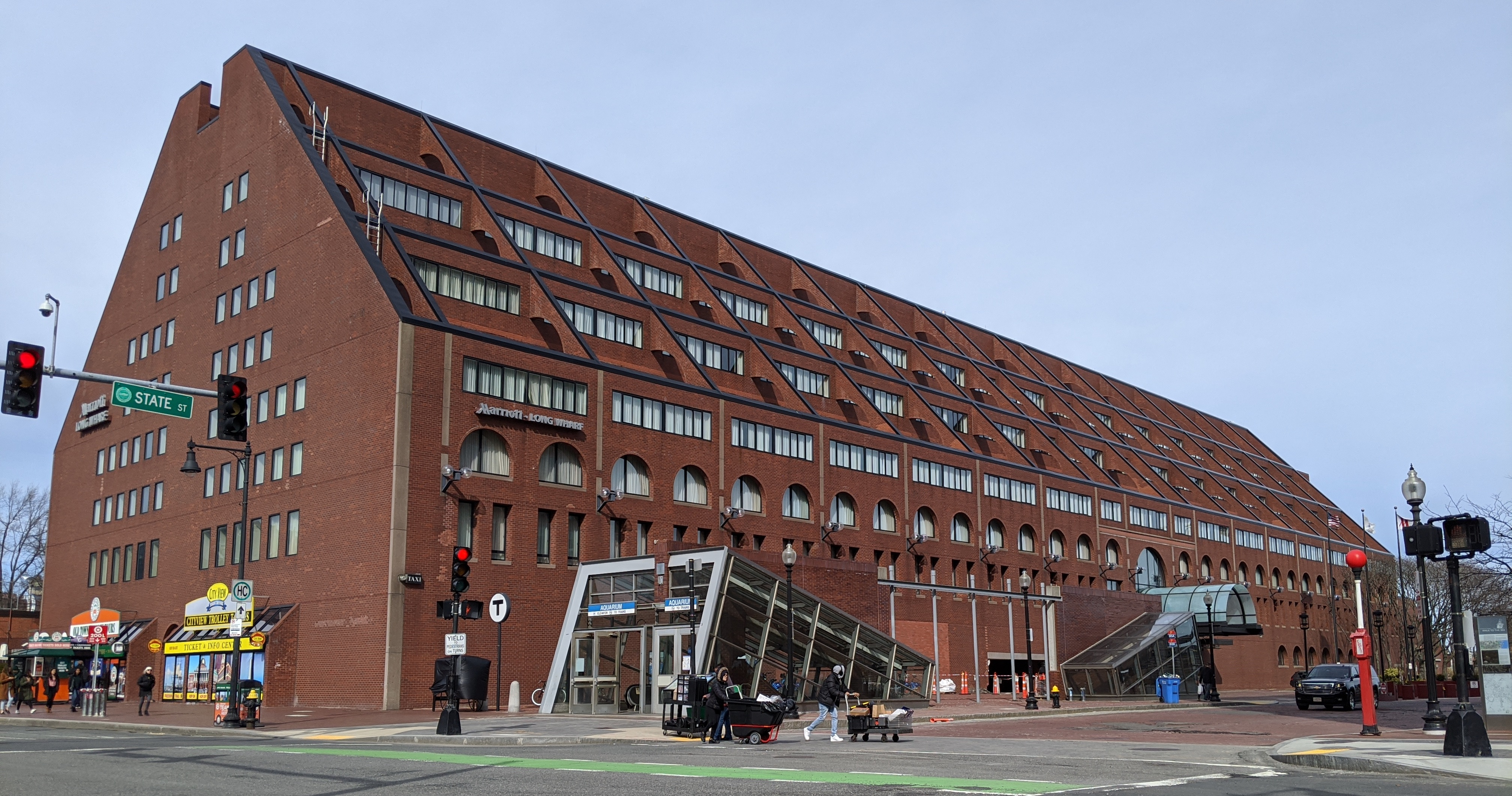
Marriott Long Wharf hotel in Boston, the site of the Biogen company meeting to which most early COVID-19 cases in Massachusetts were traced.

The first case of COVID-19 was confirmed by state health officials on February 1, making Massachusetts the fifth state in the U.S. to report a case of COVID-19. The individual, a University of Massachusetts Boston student, had returned to Boston from Wuhan, Hubei, China. 175 executives of Biogen, a biotechnology company based in Cambridge, held a two-day leadership conference from February 26–28 at the Boston Marriott Long Wharf hotel. Infected participants of the conference were later determined to have spread COVID-19 variant C2416T, which showed the conference was a superspreading event.

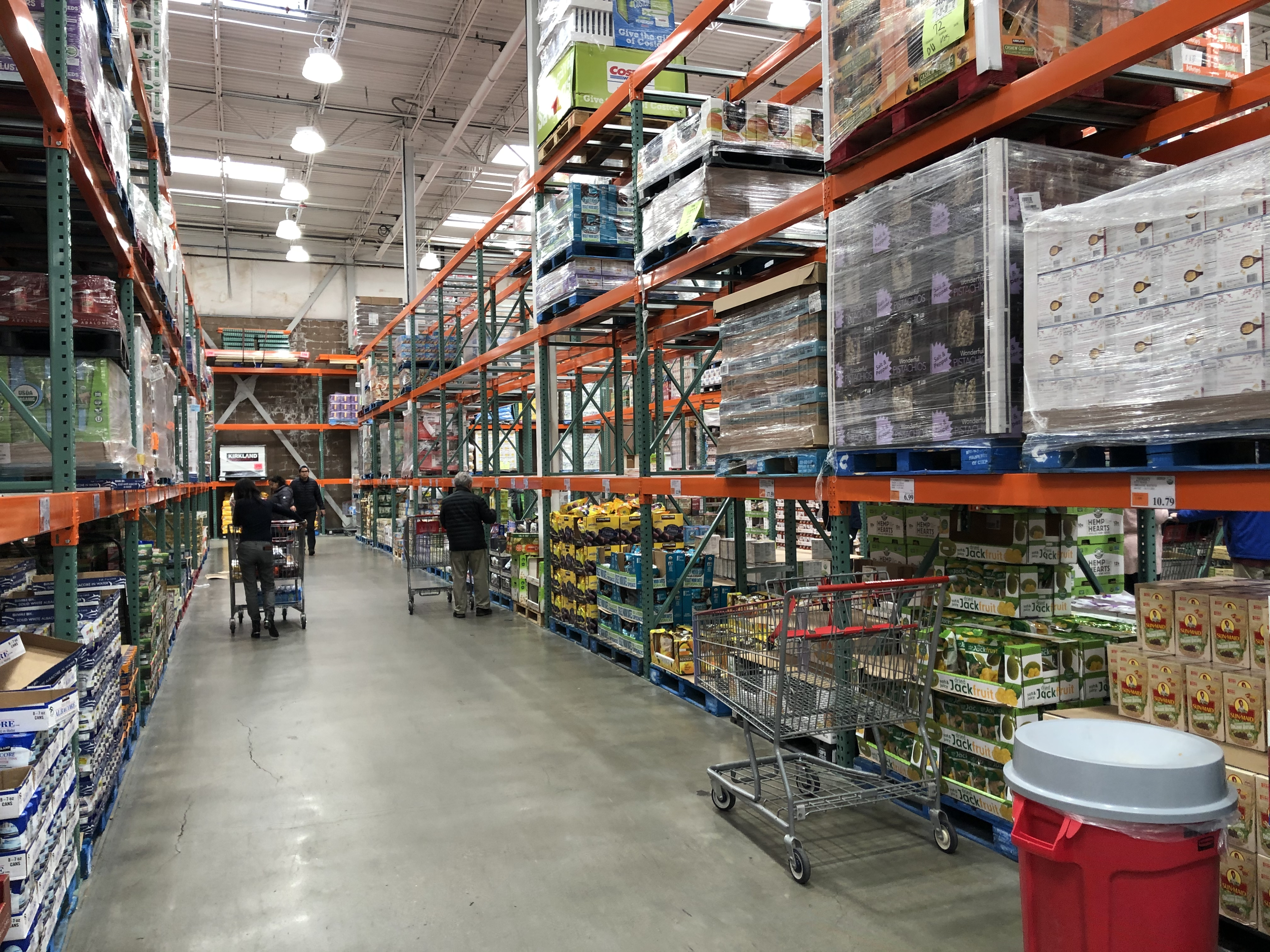
Empty shelves in the Waltham, Massachusetts Costco on March 2, 2020, after a weekend of heavy buying.

The second confirmed case in Massachusetts was reported on March 2. The first evidence of community transmission, also known as community spread, was found in a handful of cases in the Berkshires on March 10.

On March 13, Governor Charlie Baker prohibited gatherings of more than 250 people. The measure was targeted at large events and exempted most workplaces, transit buildings, polling locations, government buildings, and schools. Cardinal O'Malley, the Roman Catholic Archbishop of Boston, announced that all daily and Sunday masses and other religious services would be suspended in the Archdiocese of Boston. On March 15, Baker ordered all public and private schools in the state to close for three weeks, from March 17 through April 7. The same day, Baker banned dining at restaurants, banned gatherings of more than 25 people, relaxed unemployment claim requirements, and enacted other interventions to try to slow the spread of COVID-19.

Major hospitals began reusing protective gear or asking the public for donations of masks in mid-March. Massachusetts experienced its first death due to COVID-19 on March 20. On March 23, a stay-at-home advisory was ordered for all of Massachusetts from March 24 until April 7.

==== April–May ====
Boston Mayor Marty Walsh announced on April 2, that the Boston Convention and Exhibition Center (BCEC) would be converted into a 1,000-bed field hospital, which would later be named Boston Hope. On April 5, Boston Mayor Walsh announced a voluntary city-wide curfew for non-emergency workers in Boston from 9 p.m. to 6 a.m., and asked all Bostonians to wear face coverings in public. Governor Baker signed a law on April 20 banning residential and small business evictions and foreclosures on homeowners (other than emergencies), to remain in effect for four months or until the state of emergency is ended. Governor Baker also announced on April 20 that Massachusetts schools would not return to in-person learning for the remainder of the academic year, and extended through June 29 a previous order to close non-emergency childcare services.

4,946 new cases of COVID-19 were reported in Massachusetts on April 24, a date that would later be determined to be the peak in the first wave of cases as measured by new daily cases.

On April 28, it was reported that at the Soldiers' Home in Holyoke, at least 68 veterans – nearly 30 percent of the home's residents – had died of COVID-19 in what was at the time believed to be the deadliest outbreak at a long-term care facility in the United States.

Governor Baker issued an order on May 1, to go into effect on May 6, that required people to cover their faces in public when in situations where they were unable to keep six feet away from others. A group of several hundred anti-lockdown protesters gathered outside the Massachusetts State House on May 4 to urge Governor Baker to lift the state's stay-at-home advisory and reopen businesses.

Baker released the details of the four-phased plan to reopen businesses in Massachusetts on May 11. The stay-at-home advisory, which had been in place from March 23 and was set to expire on May 18, was modified on May 18 to a set of "safer at home" recommendations. Phase 1 of the state's reopening plan commenced on May 18, and places of worship, essential businesses, manufacturing businesses, and construction sites were allowed reopen with strict restrictions. Hospitals and health centers were also permitted to begin providing urgent preventive care and treatment services to high-risk patients.

Baker announced in a press conference on May 26 that the surge in COVID-19 cases in Massachusetts was over, as evidenced by declining numbers of people hospitalized by the disease.

==== June–July ====
Following positive trends in access to testing and decreasing hospitalizations, Massachusetts entered the first stage of Phase 2 of its reopening plan on June 8. This allowed childcare, day camps, lodging retail stores, outdoor seating at restaurants, and children's sports programs to reopen with strict precautions. The state entered stage two of Phase 2 on June 22. The June unemployment rate in Massachusetts was later calculated at 17.4%, a record high for the state and the worst of any U.S. state at the time.

Governor Baker announced on July 2 that Massachusetts would enter the first stage of Phase 3 of its reopening plan starting on Monday, July 6.

Towards the end of the month, Massachusetts began to experience a slight reversal in what had previously been positive trends in case data. Governor Baker blamed "disturbing reports of large gatherings" on the uptick in cases, a trend he described as attributable to people not following guidelines rather than a result of moving forward in the state's reopening plan.

==== August–September ====
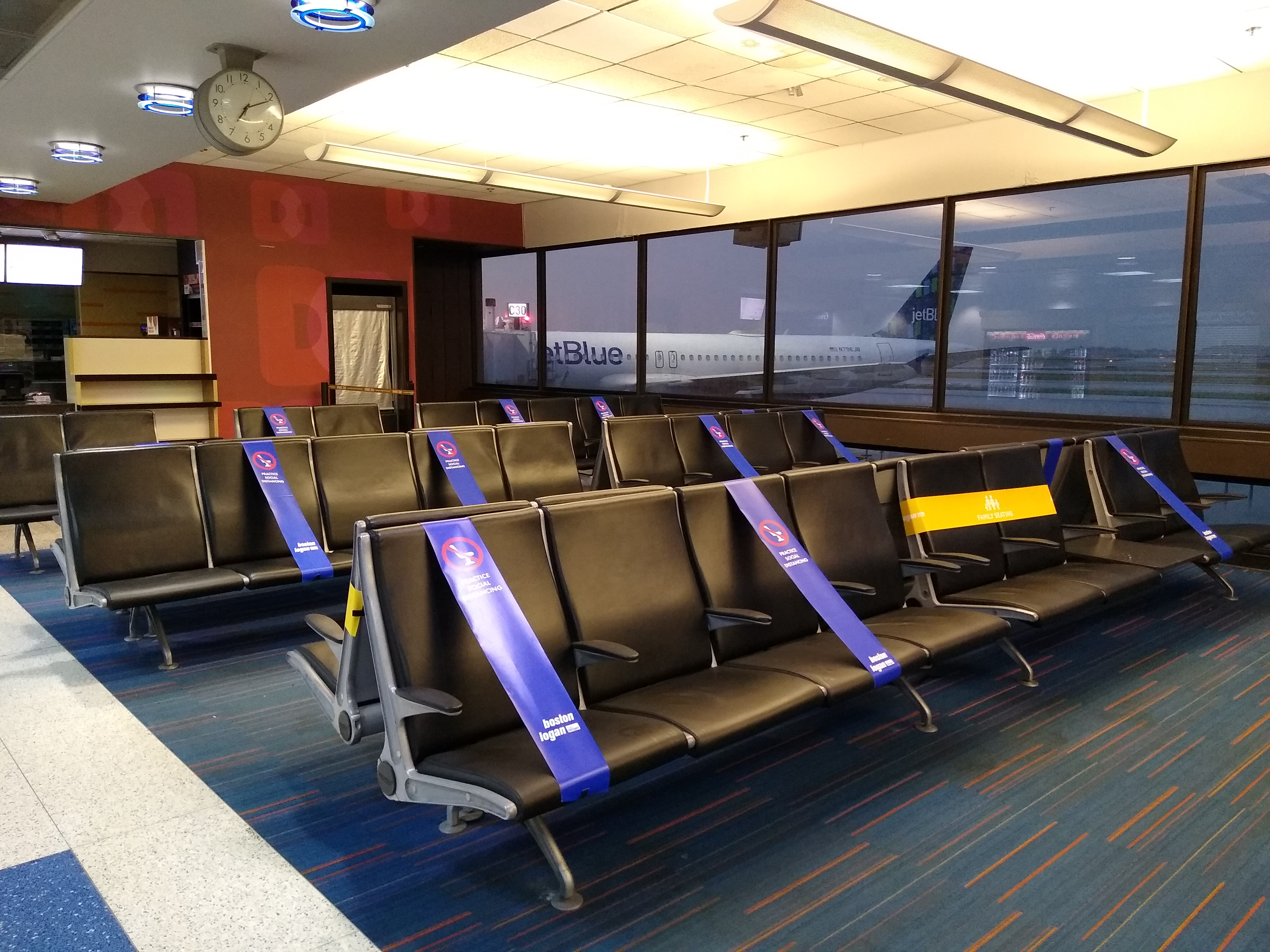
Seats blocked off at Logan International Airport in August 2020 to promote physical distancing

Governor Baker announced on August 7 that Massachusetts would postpone entering the second portion of Phase 3 of the state's reopening plan, intensify enforcement of COVID-19 regulation violations, and reduce the limit on the number of people allowed at public and private outdoors events from 100 to 50. The changes were announced after several incidents in which large parties were found to be violating the state guidelines on the numbers of people allowed to gather, as well as on masks and physical distancing.

Massachusetts school districts were required to submit their final plans for teaching in the fall, along with detailed safety protocols, by August 14. By August 21, around 30% of Massachusetts' 289 school districts had announced they would be teaching completely remotely to start the school year. The Massachusetts Department of Public Health announced on August 19 that children above the age of six months who were attending childcare, K–12 schools, and colleges and universities in the state would be required to receive a flu vaccine by December 31, 2020, in order to attend schools. This spurred some protests, including a rally of several hundred outside the State House on August 30, from parents and those who believed the decision was governmental overreach. Some colleges in Massachusetts began moving students in to dorms in mid-August.

On September 29, Governor Baker announced that communities classified by the state as "lower risk" would be allowed to move into step two of the third phase of the state's reopening plan beginning on October 5. This step included allowing both indoor and outdoor performance venues to open at 50% capacity (up to 250 people); fitting rooms to open in retail stores; and gyms, museums, libraries, and driving and flight schools to increase capacity to 50%. The Massachusetts Coalition for Health Equity criticized Baker's choice to continue reopening the state, citing concerns over increasing cases and positive test rates.

==== October–November ====
The Boston Globe reported on October 26, that COVID-19 cases in the state had risen sharply on October 22, and "have been maintaining levels we haven't seen in months". The previous day, the Globe reported that the state had acknowledged not knowing the source of infection in approximately half of the known cases in the state, raising concerns with the state's ability to identify and quickly reduce the impact of pockets of infection. Thirteen communities in Massachusetts returned to step 1 of phase 3 of the state's reopening plan after spending three weeks in the "high risk" designation.

On November 2, Governor Baker announced a statewide curfew for businesses, a tighter limit on the number of people allowed to gather indoors, and stricter face mask requirements. The previous face mask requirements applied only indoors where social distancing was not possible, and thus, were very difficult to enforce, and in practice did not exist at all. The new order required face coverings in all public places and was enforced by fines, leading mask compliance in Massachusetts to go from spotty at best to near-universal after the new mandate. The curfew required some businesses such as theaters and casinos to close at 9:30 p.m., and requires restaurants to stop providing table service at that same time. Baker also implemented a stay-at-home advisory, to begin on November 6, to encourage people to stay home between the hours of 10 p.m. and 5 a.m.

==== December ====
On December 3, Massachusetts' average positive COVID-19 test rate exceeded 4.9% for the first time since June. Total daily case numbers in the first few days of December began to surpass those seen at the April peak of the first wave of COVID-19 in the state. On December 8, Governor Baker announced that all cities and towns in Massachusetts would be required to roll back to Phase 3, Step 1 of the state's reopening plan.

On December 9, Baker announced an estimated timeline for distribution of a COVID-19 vaccine. The state's first doses arrived five days later.

=== 2021 ===
==== January–June ====
Governor Baker announced on January 4, 2021, that first responders would begin to receive doses of the COVID-19 vaccine on January 11. The following day, Baker warned that it was likely that the highly contagious variant of COVID-19 first discovered in the United Kingdom had made its way to Massachusetts, and urged state residents to "be very vigilant and careful and cautious about [their] physical engagement with other people". On January 17, the first case of the variant in Massachusetts was confirmed.

On February 1, Massachusetts entered phase two of its vaccine program, making residents 75 years of age and older eligible for the vaccine. A mass vaccination site opened at Boston's Fenway Park on the same day; it was one of two such sites operating in the state, along with one at Gillette Stadium in Foxborough. Phase two later expanded to people with comorbidities, in high-risk professions, and those 65 years of age and older.

On March 1, Massachusetts entered Phase 3, Step 2 of its reopening plan, removing capacity limits for restaurants and allowing live music performances to resume at limited capacity. On March 22, Massachusetts entered Phase 4, Step 1. Along with the new phase of the reopening plan, the previous travel order which had been in place since August 2020 was lifted and replaced with a travel advisory, which recommended a ten-day quarantine for visitors and returning residents to the state, but did not require it.

By April 5, 90% of elementary schools in the state were providing in-person education full-time. On April 19, phase three vaccination became available to anyone sixteen years old or older. On April 30, the state relaxed its mask mandate to no longer require face coverings outside when able to remain six feet from others. The new order also recommended, but no longer required, individuals to wear masks in small private gatherings. Other requirements, such as wearing masks in indoor public spaces or at larger events, remained in effect. After the CDC voted to approve the Pfizer-BioNTech vaccine in children 12 and older, Massachusetts made the vaccine available to children in that age group beginning on May 13.

Governor Baker announced on May 17, that most remaining COVID-19-related restrictions, including mask mandates (in most settings), industry restrictions, and capacity and gathering limits, would be lifted on May 29. The state of emergency ended on June 15.

State mask mandates were further loosened on May 18, with masks no longer required for outdoor activities for children and in childcare settings, and for youth sports.

On May 22, less than 1% of COVID tests were positive. The positivity rate had not been so low since September 2020.

==== July–December ====
In early August, Governor Baker said the state had no plans to implement new mask mandates. In late August, he partially reversed course, and his administration required masks in schools, though many schools were granted exemptions from it due to high vaccination rates among students and staff.

On September 9, single-day confirmed cases surpassed 2,000 for the first time since mid-April of the same year.

In September, UMass Memorial Health in Worcester ran out of ICU beds, due to a combination of (almost all unvaccinated) COVID-19 patients, patients who deferred treatment during the pandemic, and the 2021 Saint Vincent Hospital strike.

On December 21, Governor Baker advised, but did not mandate, mask-wearing indoors for fully-vaccinated people. He also announced that he had authorized the National Guard to provide help at hospitals, which were overloaded with patients. On December 22, there were 7,818 new COVID-19 cases in Massachusetts, breaking the previous record for the highest number of new cases in one day.

=== 2022 ===
==== January ====
In the winter of 2021–2022, the number of cases in the state exceeded previous daily highs, coinciding with the emergence of the SARS-CoV-2 Omicron variant in the state.

== Epidemiology ==
=== Initial exposures and spread ===
Systematic testing did not begin until mid-March 2020, so it is unknown how the virus first spread in the state. The index case of COVID-19 in Massachusetts was reported on February 1, 2020, in Boston. The patient, a University of Massachusetts Boston student in his 20s, had recently returned to Boston from Wuhan, China. The second confirmed case in Massachusetts was reported on March 2. The patient was a woman in her twenties from Norfolk County, who had recently traveled to Italy with a school group from Saint Raphael Academy in Pawtucket, Rhode Island. The disease went undetected after entering Boston, then re-emerged in early March and spread to the state's remaining 13 counties within three weeks.

Exposure clusters were reported from mid to late March 2020. Community transmission began to be reported on March 16, slightly exceeding cases related to travel. Cases that had been contact-traced to Biogen plateaued on March 13, and were surpassed by local transmissions on March 23. Cases of unknown exposure surpassed those of known exposure on March 19, then continued to grow rapidly. When the Massachusetts Department of Public Health ceased updating statistics on exposure on March 27, there were 99 cases traced to Biogen, 163 cases of local transmission, 93 cases related to travel, and 2,885 cases where initial exposure was under investigation.

=== Waves ===
Massachusetts experienced a first wave of COVID-19 that peaked in late April 2020. The rolling seven-day average of confirmed daily cases peaked at 2,300 on April 20, and average confirmed daily deaths peaked at 175 on April 24. Average hospitalizations peaked at 3,874 on April 27.

A second wave began in the autumn of the same year and peaked in January 2021, seeing higher daily case numbers but fewer deaths and hospitalizations than the first wave. The spike in cases began in October and, in the first days of December, daily case numbers surpassed those seen at the height of the first wave. The rolling seven-day average of confirmed daily cases peaked at 6,238 on January 8, 2021, and average confirmed daily deaths peaked at 77 on January 28. Average hospitalizations peaked at 2,347 on January 7.

A third spike in cases occurred in March and April 2021. The state's rolling seven-day average of confirmed daily cases peaked at 2,042 on March 31, and average hospitalizations peaked at 720 on April 8. The third wave resulted in fewer deaths than the previous two, which Senator Julian Cyr attributed to vaccines.

A fourth wave began in July and August 2021.

Another wave occurred in the winter of 2021 to 2022, coinciding with the emergence of the Omicron variant in the state, and exceeding the peak number of cases in any previous wave. As of January 13, 2022, Massachusetts was experiencing a rolling average of 13,314 new confirmed cases and 43 confirmed deaths per day.

=== Tests ===
Massachusetts has performed 37,482,115 molecular tests on 10,380,416 individuals and antigen tests on 1,850,821 individuals as of January 13, 2022.

=== Hospitalizations ===
The first four hospitalizations in Massachusetts were reported on March 9, 2020. The number of hospitalizations surpassed 10 on March 12, 100 on March 25, and 500 on March 31. As of January 13, 2022, 3,180 people were in the hospital because of COVID-19. 484 people were being treated in intensive care units, and 278 were intubated.

=== Deaths ===
Deaths due to COVID-19 have been concentrated among the elderly. The state's first death due to COVID-19 was on March 20, 2020: an 87-year-old man from Suffolk County, who was hospitalized and had preexisting health conditions. As of January 13, 2022, Massachusetts was experiencing a rolling average of 43 confirmed deaths per day, and 20,872 people had died of COVID-19 since the beginning of the pandemic.

== Government response ==
=== Closures and safety advisories ===
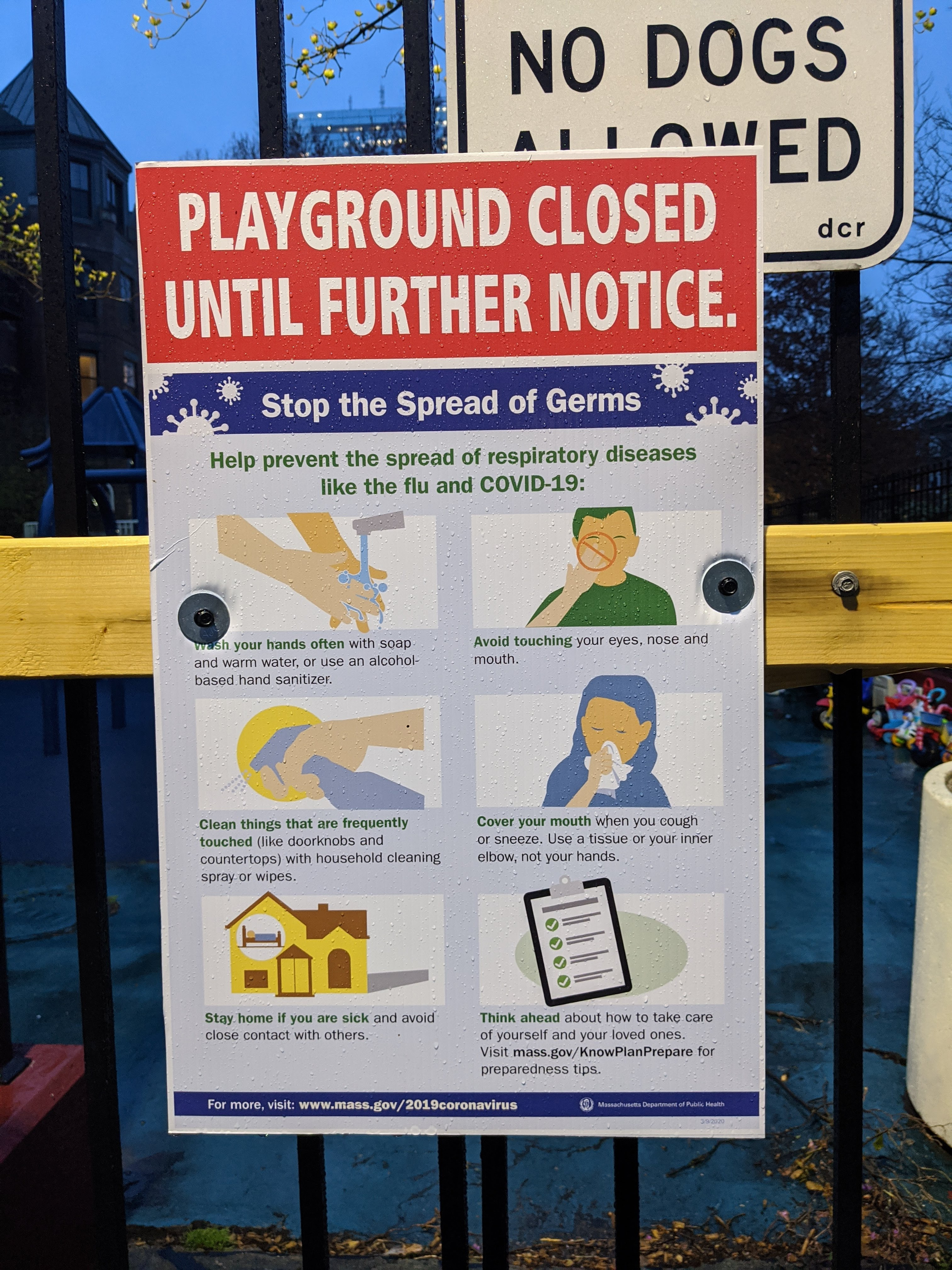
Closed playground in Boston, pictured in April 2020

Governor Charlie Baker declared a state of emergency for Massachusetts on March 10, 2020. The state of emergency ended on June 15, 2021.

On March 15, 2020, Governor Baker banned all public gatherings of more than 25 people, closed all K–12 public schools from March 17 through April 7, and banned on-site service at bars and restaurants for the same period. These closures were later extended, and on April 21, 2020, Baker announced that schools would not reopen for the remainder of the school year and extended the order to close non-emergency childcare services. Some schools began to return to in-person learning in the fall of 2020, with others remaining fully remote or adopting a hybrid approach.

On March 23, 2020, Governor Baker announced a stay-at-home advisory to be effective from March 24 until April 7. The advisory was extended several times, and on May 18, Baker renamed the advisory a "safer at home" advisory. The revised advisory encouraged residents to only leave their homes for previously excepted activities, or to visit facilities or participate in activities allowed in the reopening plan that was also detailed on May 18. Beginning November 6, 2020, following steady increases in case numbers and hospitalizations, the stay-at-home order was reinstated.

On March 27, 2020, Governor Baker asked travelers from out of state to avoid Massachusetts or to self-quarantine upon arrival for 14 days. In August 2020, a travel order was imposed, requiring all visitors and returning Massachusetts residents to quarantine for 14 days, unless they were coming from a low-risk state, had tested negative for the virus, or were included in a few other exemptions. The order was lifted on March 22, 2021, and replaced with a travel advisory, in which a ten-day quarantine was advised but not required. As of January 2022, no travel orders or advisories were in place.

=== Masks ===
On April 5, 2020, Boston's Mayor Walsh encouraged, but did not require, people to wear masks when outside their homes. He asked that people leave medical masks for essential workers and make their own if necessary. On May 1, Governor Baker issued an order, effective May 6, that required people to cover their faces in public when in situations where they are unable to keep six feet away from others. Starting on May 18, people were required to wear masks while using public transit.

On April 30, 2021, the order was revised to require face coverings at indoor public places, at indoor or outdoor events in public or private spaces, or outdoors when unable to stay six feet apart. The previous order required face coverings in all public places, regardless of whether people could distance from others. Until May 29, 2021, face masks or cloth face coverings were required in all indoor public places, outdoors when unable to socially distance, or at events. On May 29, the mask requirement was lifted, though unvaccinated people were still advised to wear masks inside and when unable to physically distance. As of January 2022, fully-vaccinated people are advised to wear masks when indoors (outside of their own homes) if they have weakened immune systems, or if anyone in their household has a weakened immune system, is at increased risk of disease, or is an unvaccinated adult. Masks are still required for all people regardless of vaccination status in some venues, such as on public and private transportation systems and in healthcare facilities and congregate care settings. Beginning December 21, 2021, following the emergence of the Delta and Omicron variants in Massachusetts, the DPH began advising fully-vaccinated individuals to also wear masks indoors, when not in their own homes.

=== Field hospitals ===
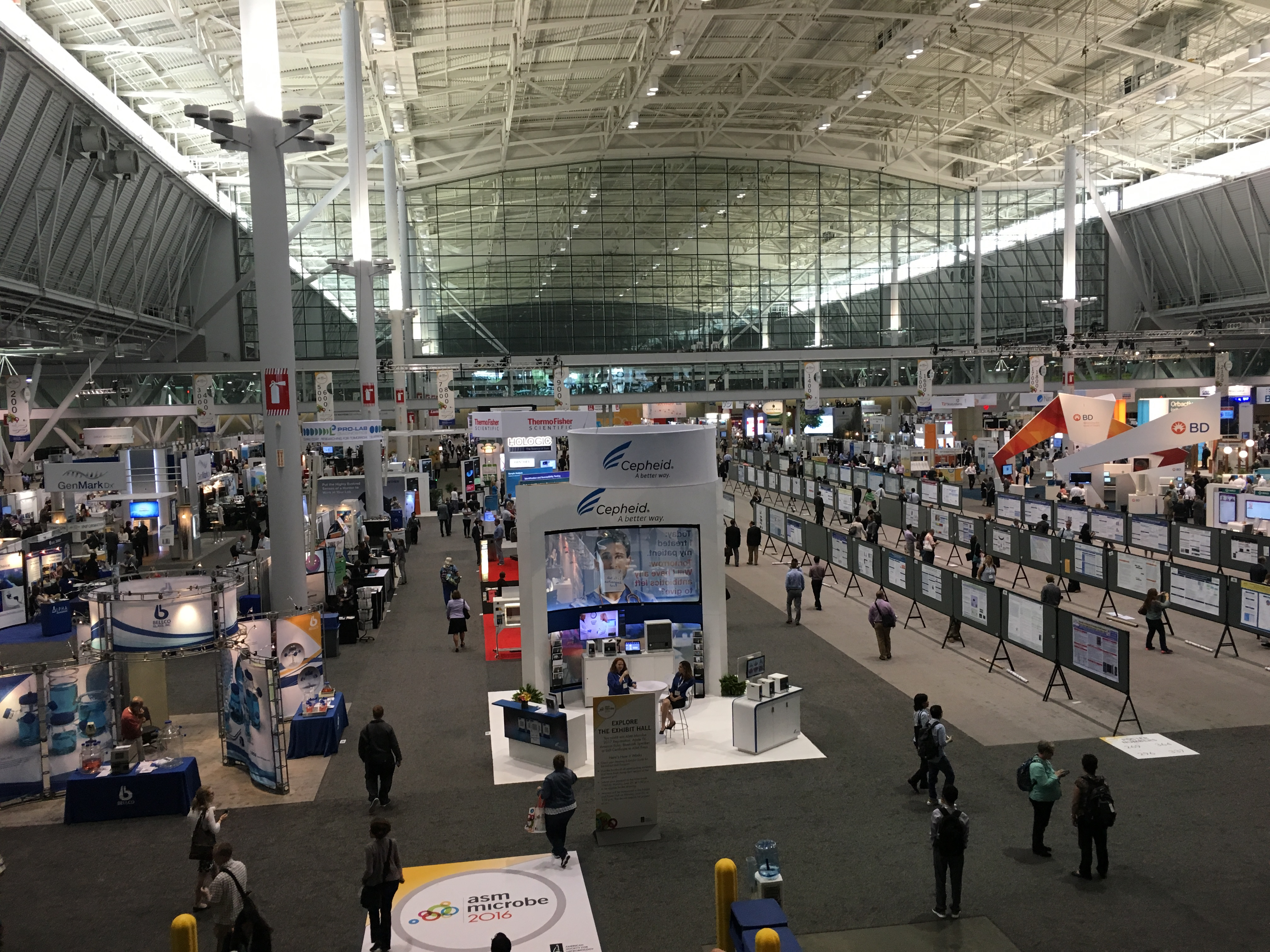
Interior of the Boston Convention and Exhibition Center (BCEC), pictured during a 2016 conference. The BCEC was converted to a field hospital named Boston Hope.

In early 2020, Massachusetts created five field hospitals to handle less critical patients, in case the expected surge in COVID-19 patients overwhelmed regular hospitals despite their efforts to increase intensive care capacity. The largest was Boston Hope, a field hospital established in the Boston Convention and Exhibition Center (BCEC). It cost $12 million and included 1,000 single rooms separated by sheetrock walls. 200 rooms were equipped with oxygen lines, and six were set up for intensive care. It received its first patient on April 10, and treated some 720 patients over seven and a half weeks, including homeless people and those who had begun the process of recuperating from COVID-19. A 200-bed field hospital at the DCU Center in Worcester saw 275 patients. Three other field hospitals in Bourne, Dartmouth, and Lowell never saw a patient. Following the first wave in cases, all field hospitals were closed. The Boston Hope facility at BCEC was sanitized and shrink-wrapped, ready for a possible future surge; other facilities were dismantled and placed in storage.

In October 2020, the Worcester field hospital began preparing to reopen by the first week of December to handle overflow cases from the second wave of COVID-19 affecting the state. The first patients to be treated following the hospital reopening arrived on December 6, 2020. The hospital announced it would again suspend operations due to declining case numbers, effective March 15, 2021.

=== Reopening ===
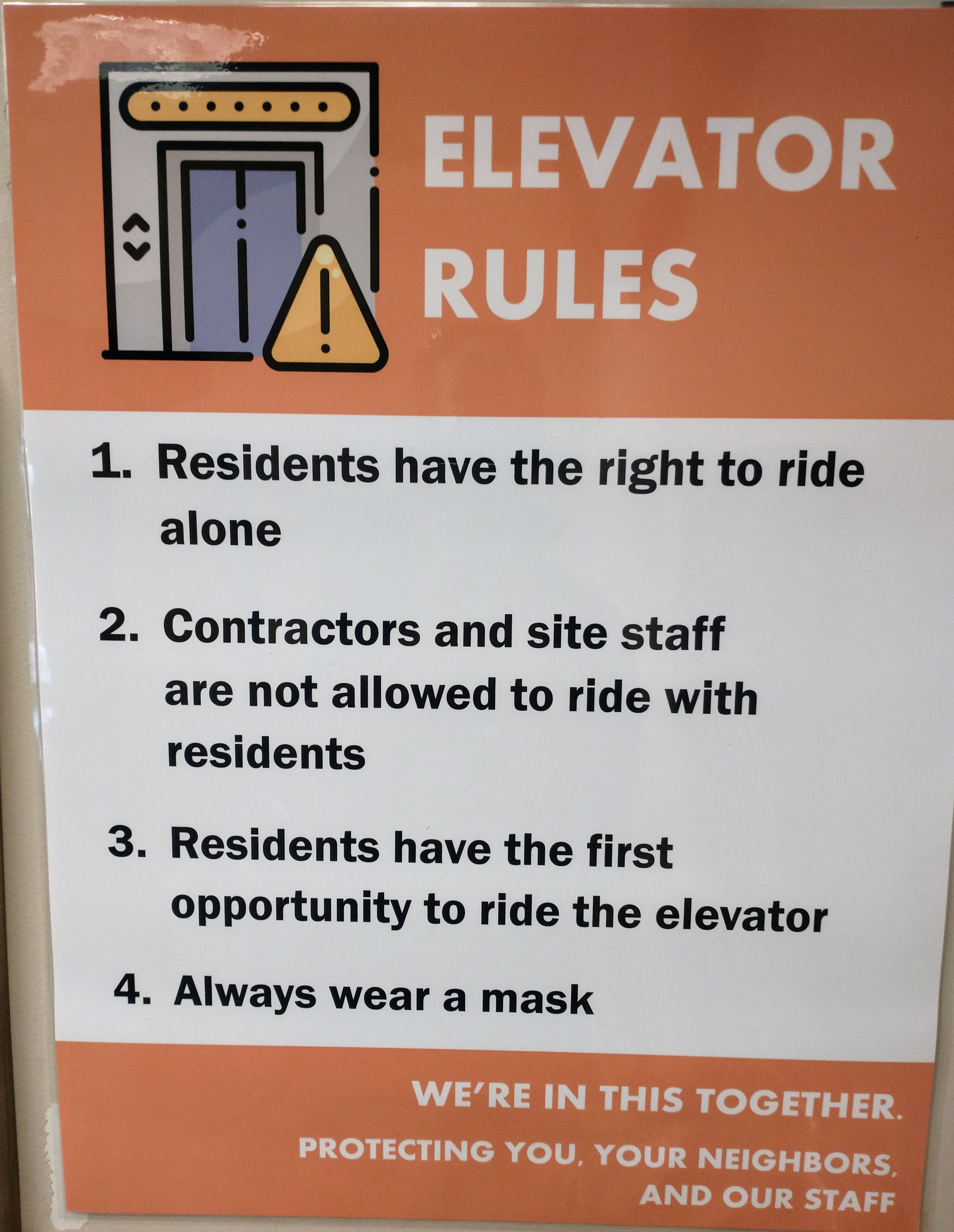
Rules of conduct for riding an elevator in a Cambridge, Massachusetts apartment building during the COVID-19 pandemic.

On May 11, 2020, Governor Baker announced a four-phased plan to reopen the state. Each phase allowed a broader set of industries to reopen, with some restrictions on how they may operate. The state also published Mandatory Workplace Safety Standards to be followed by industries included in the phase one reopening. These standards included requirements for physical distancing, hygiene, staffing policies, and cleaning and disinfecting.

On May 18, Governor Baker released the detailed version of the reopening plan, and began phase one by allowing places of worship, essential businesses, manufacturing businesses, and construction sites to reopen with strict restrictions. Also beginning May 18, hospitals and health centers were permitted to begin providing urgent preventive care and treatment services to high-risk patients. Beginning on May 25, additional businesses were able to open, also with restrictions. Massachusetts entered phase two of the reopening plan on June 8. On July 2, Governor Baker announced that Massachusetts would enter Phase 3, Stage 1 of its reopening plan starting on Monday, July 6, though some communities delayed entering. Some communities began to enter Stage 2 of Phase 3 on October 5, 2020. On December 8, 2020, Baker announced that all cities and towns in Massachusetts would be required to roll back to Phase 3, Step 1 of the state's reopening plan due to a second wave of the virus; the state returned to Phase 3, Step 2 on March 1, 2021. Massachusetts entered Phase 4 of reopening on March 22, and entered the second stage of Phase 4 on May 10.

=== COVID-19 vaccine ===
On December 9, 2020, Governor Baker announced a three-phased plan to prioritize access to COVID-19 vaccines among Massachusetts residents. The first doses of the vaccine arrived in Massachusetts on December 14, 2020. The first people to be given access to the vaccine, in phase one of the vaccine timeline, were healthcare workers, first responders, and long-term and congregate care facilities (including correctional facilities and shelters). Phase two included those with comorbidities, those in professions putting them at a high risk for exposure (such as K–12 teachers, grocery store employees, and sanitation and public works employees), and those 65 years of age and older. Massachusetts entered phase two on February 1, 2021. In phase three, which began on April 19, 2021, the vaccine became available to anyone sixteen years old or older. After the CDC voted to approve the Pfizer-BioNTech vaccine in children 12 and older, Massachusetts made the vaccine available to children in that age group beginning on May 13.

As of December 30, 2021, 90.6% of people in Massachusetts had received at least one dose of a COVID-19 vaccine, and 74.6% were fully vaccinated.

=== Influenza vaccine ===
On August 19, 2020, the Massachusetts Department of Health announced mandatory influenza vaccinations for all students by December 31, 2020, to reduce the number of people hospitalized with respiratory infections. It applied to children 6 months or older in child care facilities, and all pre-school, K-12, and college students, except homeschooled K-12 and remote-only college students.

The flu shot requirement was dropped on January 8, 2021, due to the mild flu season and to allow the state to focus on COVID-19 vaccinations.

=== Voting ===
A bill signed into law on July 6, 2020, expanded the time period for early voting, and also allowed any voter in Massachusetts to vote by mail during any 2020 election, without specifying a reason. Voters were required to submit an application for a mail-in ballot, and applications were mailed to every registered voter before the September state primary and November general election. 3.7 million Massachusetts residents voted in the 2020 United States elections, with over 1.5 million (42%) voting by mail, and over 840,000 (23%) voting early.

=== Legal challenges ===
Governor Baker's emergency orders were challenged in court by a number of lawsuits. One successful federal suit resulted in the state's reopening guidelines being amended to allow gun stores to re-open along with businesses that had been designated as essential. Another federal lawsuit demanding houses of worship be opened under the Free Exercise Clause of the U.S. Constitution was rendered moot when Baker included them in the list of venues allowed to reopen during the state's first phase. A state court ruled the governor had lawful authority to close marijuana stores. A complaint in Desrosiers v. Baker, a conservative-backed lawsuit filed on June 1, sought to invalidate the governor's state of emergency order and amendments, including all business closures, orders to wear face coverings, and restrictions on the size of public gatherings.

== Spread among population groups ==
=== Long-term care facilities ===
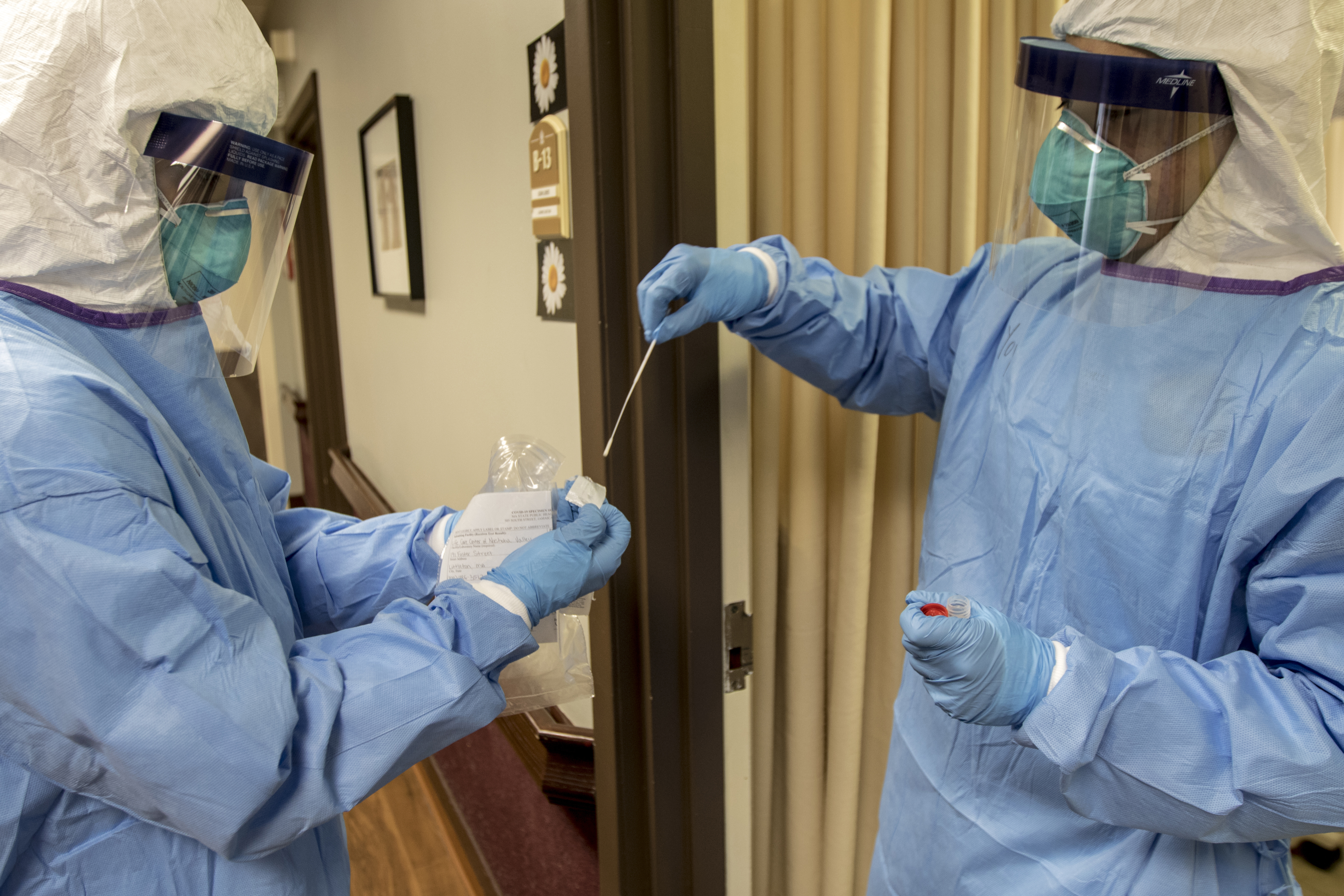
A medic with the Massachusetts National Guard and a resident of the Life Care Center of Nashoba Valley nursing home handle a nasal swab that will be used to test for COVID-19.

As of April 14, 2021, 9,018 deaths had been attributed to COVID-19 in long-term care facilities in Massachusetts. Deaths among residents of long-term care facilities at that point made up 52% of all COVID-19 deaths in the state. As of June 26, 35,350 residents and healthcare workers at these facilities have tested positive for the virus, and 425 of the 427 long-term care facilities in Massachusetts have reported at least one case of COVID-19. In April 2020, the state allocated a total of $260 million in additional funding to long-term care facilities, introduced incentives for job applicants to the facilities, and created a team of nurses to be deployed to the centers in emergencies. Facilities also began to be audited for compliance with a checklist of care criteria.

==== Soldiers' Home in Holyoke ====
Soldiers' Home, a long-term care facility for older veterans in Holyoke, experienced one of the deadliest outbreaks of the virus out of long-term care facilities in the United States. On March 30, 2020, a potential cluster of COVID-19 cases was reported at the facility. Eleven residents had recently died, and another eleven residents along with several staff members had tested positive for the virus. By the end of the summer, 76 residents, or about a third of the home's population, had died from COVID-19.

Holyoke Mayor Alex Morse accused the nursing facility of mismanagement and lack of transparency in the events surrounding the outbreak and its resulting fatalities. Governor Baker announced on April 1 that he had appointed an independent investigator to examine the outbreak at Soldiers' Home. On April 10, the U.S. Attorney's office in Boston announced that it would be opening a federal investigation into whether Soldiers' Home violated the rights of its patients by failing to provide them adequate medical care and protection during the COVID-19 outbreak. On September 25, Massachusetts' attorney general announced that two leaders of the facility had been indicted on charges of criminal neglect in relation to the outbreak.

=== Racial disparities ===
People of color in Massachusetts have been disproportionately affected by the COVID-19 pandemic, a phenomenon that has been observed throughout the United States.

Preliminary data showed in April that African Americans and others of African descent in Massachusetts were being disproportionately impacted by COVID-19. Although only 25% of the population of Boston are black, they initially accounted for 41% of the COVID-19 cases in the city. On April 9, 2020, the city of Boston announced it had created a COVID-19 Health Inequities Task Force to advise the city in addressing inequality among testing, data analysis, and healthcare for underrepresented racial groups. On April 7, it was reported that at Massachusetts General Hospital the proportion of Latinos among COVID-19 patients was four times the percentage of Latinos among people usually being treated at the hospital.

Public health experts reported that the virus was disproportionately affecting Massachusetts communities with high black, Latino, and immigrant populations because many in those communities were being exposed to the virus through essential jobs at grocery stores, public transit, and food delivery services. They also attributed the higher prevalence of the disease to members of those communities living in smaller or more densely populated homes, making physical distancing from other household members challenging. A study released in late August 2020 by a team of researchers from the Harvard T.H. Chan School of Public Health and Beth Israel Deaconess Medical Center confirmed that black and Hispanic or Latino populations were significantly more affected by the virus than white populations in Massachusetts, and echoed the hypotheses around essential jobs and household density contributing to higher infection rates.

According to October 26, 2020, data from the American Medical Association, while 71% of the population of Massachusetts is white, only 32% of total confirmed cases of COVID-19 were among white people. Conversely, black, Hispanic, and Asian individuals represented 9%, 12%, and 7% of the population, respectively, and made up 9%, 24%, and 2% of total COVID-19 cases.

=== Prison population ===
On March 21, 2020, the Massachusetts Department of Correction (DOC) announced the first confirmed case of COVID-19 among its inmate population. According to officials at the Massachusetts Treatment Center (MTC) in Bridgewater, Massachusetts, a male inmate who is serving a life sentence tested positive. Massachusetts DOC noted at the time that this was the only known case of COVID-19 in its inmate population.

On April 10, 2020, the Massachusetts DOC released data showing the rate of infection among female inmates at MCI–Framingham was nearly ten times that of the overall state prison population, with 17 (7.8 percent) infected.

An August 2020 study by researchers from Brigham and Women's Hospital and Harvard University found that the infection rate in Massachusetts jails and prisons was almost three times that of those in Massachusetts who are not incarcerated.

=== Homeless population ===
On April 7, 2020, there were around 200 cases of COVID-19 among homeless people in Boston, which was around 30% of the homeless people who had been tested. The city of Boston allocated 500 of the beds at the field hospital being created at the Boston Convention and Exposition Center to go to homeless people with COVID-19. A homeless shelter in Worcester found on April 17 that out of 114 shelter guests who were tested for SARS-CoV-2, 49 (43%) tested positive. Many of those who tested positive were asymptomatic or had mild symptoms; Dr. Erik Garcia, the medical director of the Homeless Outreach and Advocacy Project at the Family Health Center of Worcester, said that "there were some symptoms, but certainly none of the classic symptoms. And most people were complaining of a slight worsening of the chronic cough that they already had – no fevers and no other symptoms." After a cluster of COVID-19 cases were traced back to the Boston Pine Street Inn shelter in April, the Boston Health Care for the Homeless Program tested all shelter guests for the virus and found that out of 397 people tested, 146 tested positive but had been experiencing no symptoms. On April 24, Boston Mayor Walsh announced that public health officials would be testing everyone in the city's shelter system for SARS-CoV-2. As of April 23, 1,340 people had been tested, and 453 (34%) of them tested positive.

== Societal effects ==
=== Food supplies and supermarkets ===
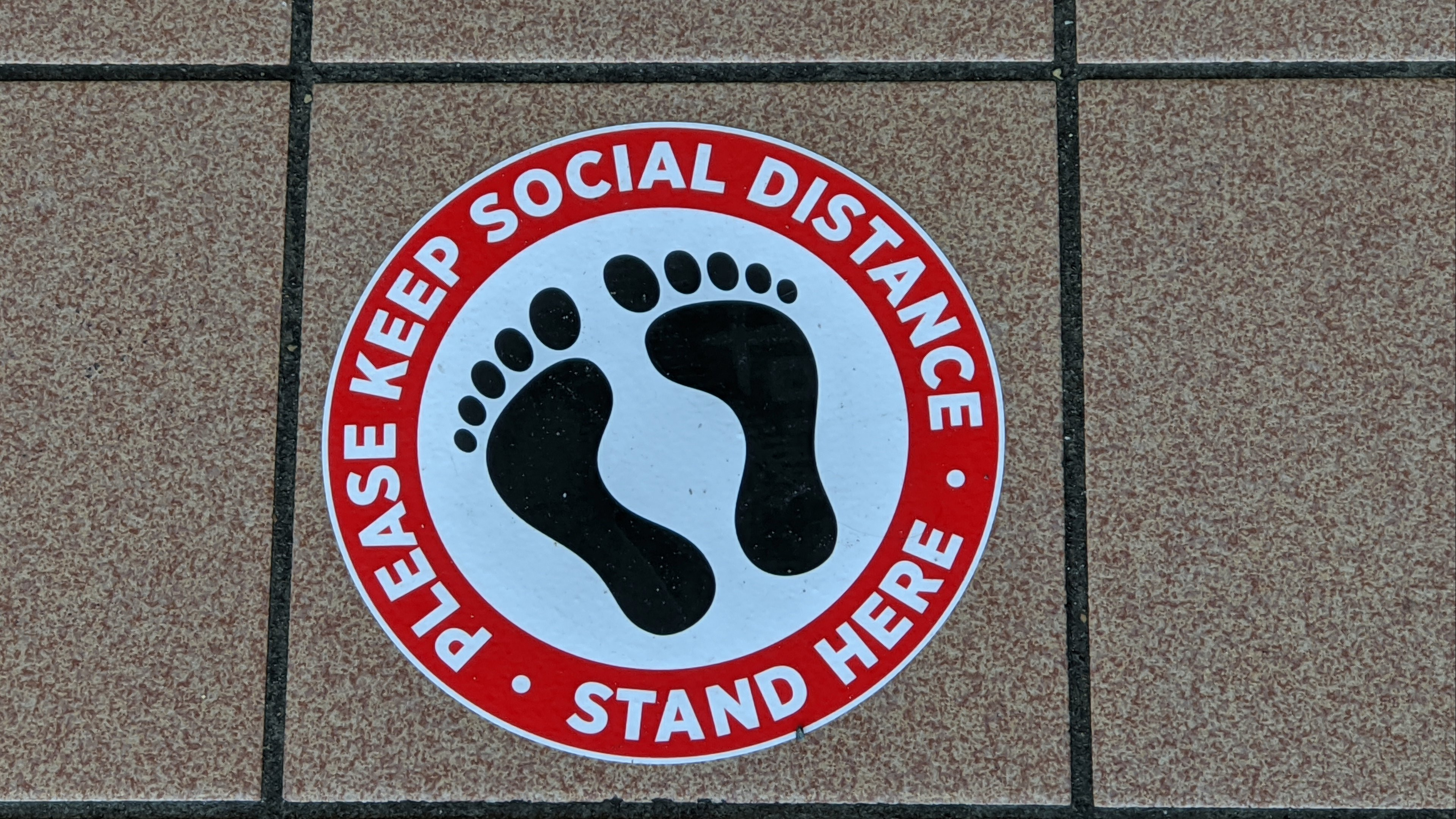
Floor sign in Somerville instructing people where to stand to maintain physical distance from others.

Panic buying, which spiked noticeably the week of March 11, 2020, led to shortages of some products, and there were crowds and long lines at grocery stores as early in the day as 7:00 a.m. Pandemic supplies like sanitizing supplies and masks remained difficult to get for weeks, as did toilet paper. Grocery retailers shortened their hours to allow employees more time to restock, and as later required by state law, to offer older and more vulnerable people a time in the early morning when they can shop separately. Later, emergency orders required grocery stores to implement stricter measures, including limiting the number of people allowed inside stores at a time and marking queues to maintain social distancing. Stores installed plastic guards to reduce contact between customers and cashiers, and designated some aisles one-way. By the end of May, grocery stores started expanding hours, with toilet paper back on shelves significant quantities but home baking supplies like yeast and flour with thin stocks.

The Greater Boston Food Bank said that it experienced double the normal demand for food in June, distributing more food per month than it ever had before. It also said that because food donations from restaurants and grocery stores plummeted, it was spending about 50 times as much money to buy food, though the Massachusetts government provided cash assistance, and the federal government provided surplus food purchased from farmers via the Coronavirus Food Assistance Program.

=== Schools and universities ===
==== Spring 2020 ====
School closures began in early March, when Massachusetts Institute of Technology announced on March 9 that it was moving to only-online classes for the remainder of the spring semester. Also on March 9, three elementary schools were closed due to students and parents of students being tested for the virus. Northeastern University, which had already closed satellite campuses in San Francisco and Seattle, hesitated to close their main campus for fear of international students losing their F visa status, and on March 6 the university publicly called on the Department of Homeland Security to grant clemency for international students so the university could close. By early April, many colleges and state school districts had announced closures ranging from weeks to months in duration. On March 13, Boston announced that its public schools would close for six weeks from Tuesday, March 17 through April 26. On March 15, Governor Baker ordered all schools in Massachusetts to close for three weeks from March 17 through April 7. On March 25, he extended the closing through May 4. On April 21, he extended it to the remainder of the school year.

==== Fall 2020 ====
In July, Massachusetts schools were directed to prepare plans for three scenarios for fall 2020: entirely in-classroom teaching, entirely remote teaching, and a combined teaching model. Governor Baker said on July 27 that schools should anticipate needing to "pivot" from one scenario to another in response to local pandemic data. By August 21, around 30% of Massachusetts' 289 school districts had announced they would be teaching completely remotely to start the school year. State universities in Bridgewater, Fitchburg, Framingham, Salem, Westfield, and Worcester announced in June that they would be bringing students on-campus to attend classes. Private colleges in the state chose various models for the fall school semester. Some, including Berklee College of Music, College of the Holy Cross, and Smith College, decided to hold courses entirely remotely; others opted to offer a combination of online and in-person classes, such as Boston College, Brandeis University, and Roxbury Community College. Some colleges invited only some students to return to campus, such as MIT which only allowed seniors on-campus and Harvard University which only allowed freshmen and students who had been specially invited for academic reasons. By early September, several Massachusetts universities had received media attention when students disregarded social distancing rules imposed by the schools, and some schools in the state experienced outbreaks.

==== Fall 2021 ====
The Massachusetts Department of Elementary and Secondary Education issued a requirement for all public schools to resume in person learning for the Fall 2021 semester in May 2021. Many colleges and universities in the area implemented vaccination requirements, including Harvard University, Boston University, and University of Massachusetts Amherst. The Massachusetts Teachers Association also issued a statement supporting mandatory vaccinations. Governor Baker did not institute a statewide vaccination mandate for public schools, instead leaving it up to the individual districts, some of which implemented mandates of their own.

== Statistics ==
Graphs use data from the Massachusetts Department of Public Health daily report. Cases in these charts are reported by the date the test was administered, rather than the day the result was recorded. As a result, recent days may have artificially low numbers while tests are processed. Data only includes confirmed cases and deaths due to confirmed cases; probable cases are not counted.

== See also ==
- Timeline of the COVID-19 pandemic in the United States
- COVID-19 pandemic – for impact on other countries
