= 2021–2022 Saint Vincent Hospital strike =

Nurse strike in Worcester, Massachusetts, US

2021–22 Saint Vincent Hospital strike
- Date: March 8, 2021 – January 3, 2022
- Location: Worcester, Massachusetts, United States
- Goals: Increased staffing levels for nurses
- Methods: Strike action; Walkout; Picketing

Parties
Saint Vincent Hospital	Massachusetts Nurses Association

The 2021–22 Saint Vincent Hospital strike was a labor strike involving nurses at the Saint Vincent Hospital in Worcester, Massachusetts, United States. The strike began on March 8, 2021, following disputes between the Massachusetts Nurses Association, which represents about 800 nurses at the hospital, and the hospital regarding staffing levels, and ended on January 3, 2022, after the nurses ratified an agreement with the hospital.

== Background ==
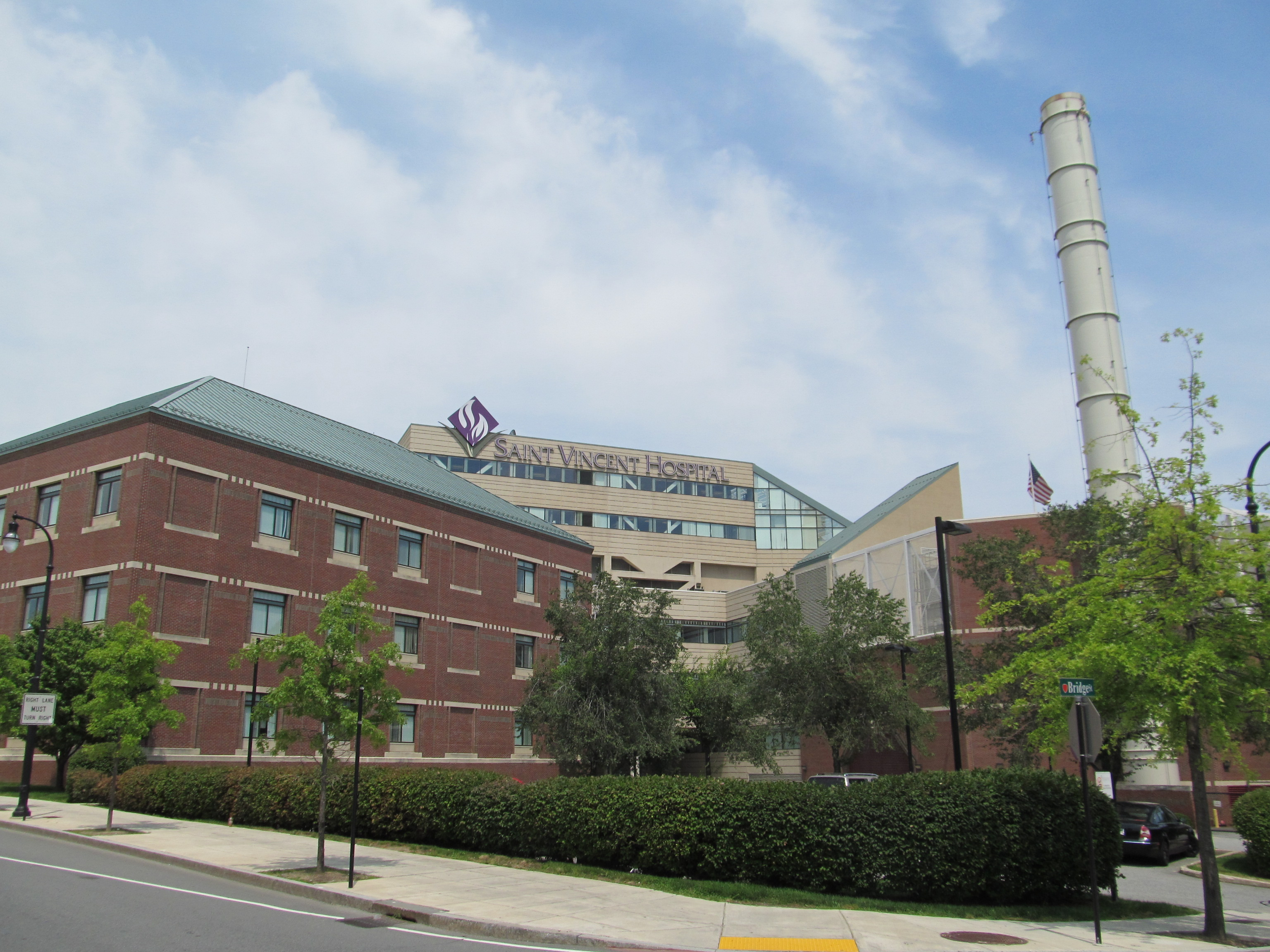
Saint Vincent Hospital in Worcester, Massachusetts

Saint Vincent Hospital is a hospital owned by Tenet Healthcare and located in Worcester, Massachusetts. It is one of the few for-profit hospitals in Massachusetts. Beginning around 2019, hospital officials and union representatives from the Massachusetts Nurses Association (MNA, a labor union which represents several hundred nurses at the hospital) began to negotiate issues regarding pay and staffing levels at the hospital. According to the hospital, a labor contract proposal between the two groups included a "substantial" pay increase for the nurses, but by 2021, the two groups had still not come to an agreement regarding staffing levels. The hospital claims that the union's demands are "unreasonable" and allege that the hospital has "one of the most generous staffing ratios in the state". However, the union rejects this claim, arguing that nurses routinely have to attend to five patients at a time and that staffing levels at the nearby UMass Memorial Medical Center are lower than those at Saint Vincent. In both December 2020 and January 2021, some nurses performed informational picketing outside the hospital.

In mid-February 2021, the nurses voted to authorize open-ended strike action against the hospital, and on February 23, the union issued their 10-day notice of their intent to strike. The vote had passed with 89% of the nurses voting to approve the strike action. The last strike action taken by the union was a 2017 strike at Tufts Medical Center that lasted one day and was followed by a four-day lockout, while the union's last open-ended strike (a strike with no set time limit) occurred at Brockton Hospital in 2001 and lasted 104 days. MNA members had previously performed strike action at Saint Vincent in 2001 while seeking their first labor contract with the hospital. The last meeting between the union and hospital representatives before the strike started was on March 3, where a counteroffer made by the union was rejected by the hospital without a subsequent counteroffer.

== Course of the strike ==
On March 8, 2021, the strike began, with approximately 800 nurses performing a walkout. The strikers announced that they planned to picket from 6 a.m. to midnight until "we accomplish what we set out to do". To accommodate for the nurses' absence, the hospital hired replacement workers at a cost of $5.4 million for five days. Several nurses crossed the picket line, though the union claimed it was fewer than they had anticipated. On the morning of March 12, former U.S. Representative Joe Kennedy III joined the picket line in support of the strikers, while U.S. Senator Elizabeth Warren and Representative Jim McGovern were at the picket line that afternoon. That same day, the strike became the longest nurses strike in the state in two decades. During the strike, the hospital has experienced issues with other unions representing hospital workers. Local 1445 of the United Food and Commercial Workers (UFCW) announced plans to perform informational picketing alongside the nurses, as their contract with the hospital had expired on February 28 without a replacement. Additionally, Local 170 of the International Brotherhood of Teamsters claimed that their members were being tasked with duties outside their normal work, a claim which has been denied by the hospital's CEO Carolyn Jackson.

On March 15, the hospital alleged that union members were bullying and harassing nurses who had crossed the picket line and issued a list of incidents they claimed had been committed by striking nurses. The union denied the accusations and accused the hospital of deflecting from the issues that had caused the strike. On March 21, the strike entered its second week. On March 28, the Telegram & Gazette reported that the hospital had set up security cameras outside the hospital to monitor strikers, with Jackson claiming that they were to ensure the safety of people entering the hospital. The cameras were criticized by the union as an intimidation tactic and an unnecessary expenditure. That same day, McGovern and U.S. Senator Ed Markey met with strikers. In addition, the city council of Worcester approved a resolution stating their support for the strike, and Massachusetts Attorney General Maura Healey voiced her support. On March 29, Spectrum News reported that the hospital was spending about $30,000 per day on police details. Additionally, an April 2 article in The Republican claimed that the hospital had spent several million dollars over the first several weeks of the strikes on replacement nurses, with the average replacement nurse being paid double the average pay for a regular nurse at Saint Vincent. On April 4, an Easter event was held at the picket line.

On December 17, 2021, over nine months after the strike had begun, the MNA and the hospital reached a tentative agreement to end the strike, pending ratification from the union nurses. The vote to ratify the agreement took place on January 3, 2022, which the nurses voting overwhelmingly in favor of ratification, thus ending the strike after 301 days.

== See also ==
- COVID-19 pandemic in Massachusetts
- Impact of the COVID-19 pandemic on healthcare workers
- Impact of the COVID-19 pandemic on hospitals
- Strikes during the COVID-19 pandemic
