= Saint Vincent Hospital =

Coordinates: 42.2645°N 71.7968°W

- Tenet Healthcare
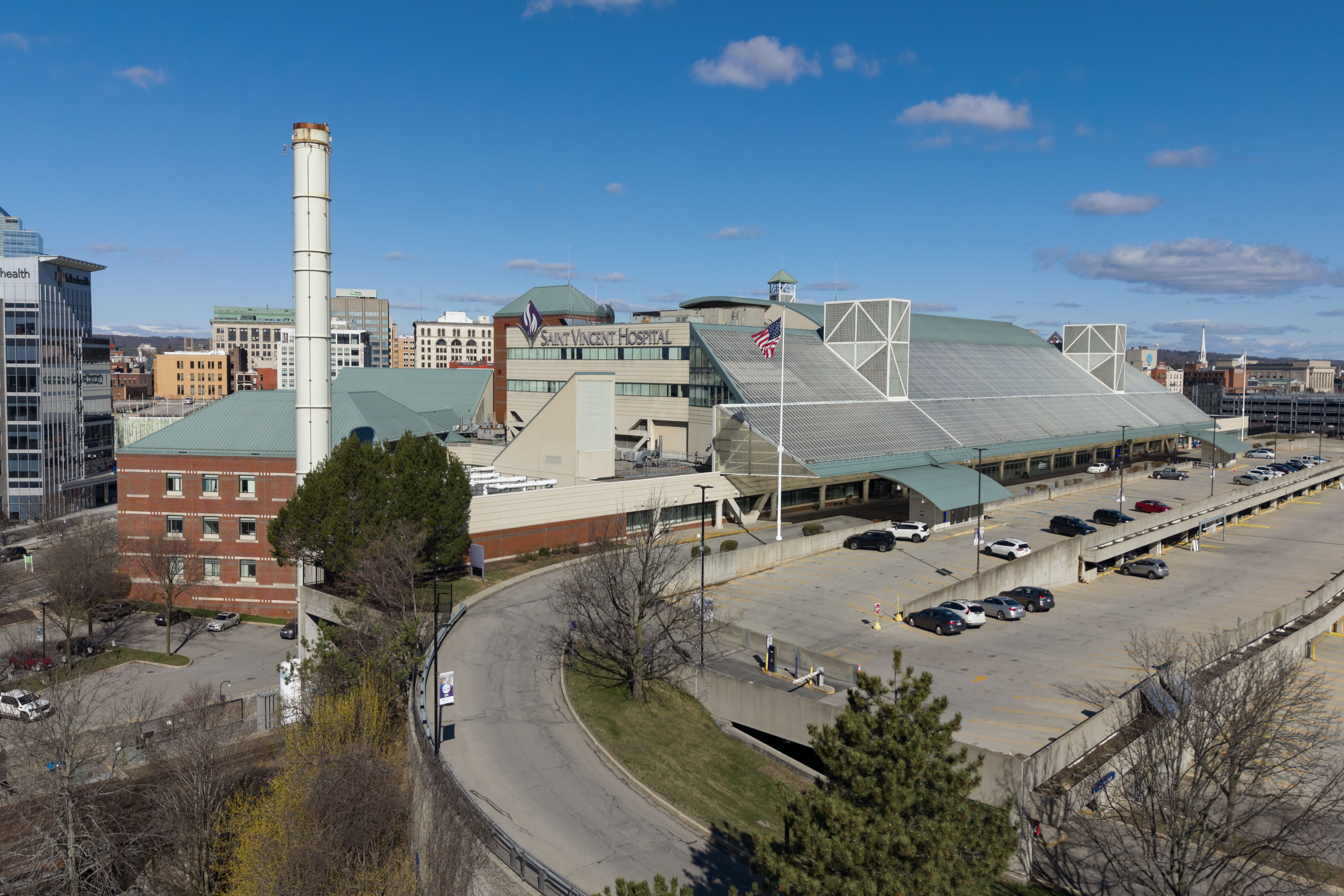
- Exterior

Geography
- Location: 123 Summer Street, Worcester, MA, United States

History
- Founded: 1893

Links
- Website: www.stvincenthospital.com
- Lists: Hospitals in the United States

Saint Vincent Hospital is a 381-bed hospital located in Worcester, Massachusetts. Founded by the Catholic Sisters of Providence of Holyoke in 1893, Saint Vincent's was named after the patron saint of the Sisters' order, Saint Vincent de Paul. In 1990, the hospital merged with the Fallon Healthcare System. Vanguard Health Systems purchased the hospital in 2005. In 2021, nurses went on strike at the hospital, which by this time was owned by Tenet Healthcare.

== 2021 Nurse strike ==
In around 2019, the management of the hospital and the union representatives from the Massachusetts Nurses Association, initiated a negotiation regarding pay and staffing levels at the hospital. According to the management of the hospital, a labor contract proposal between the two involved parties included a "substantial" pay increase for the nurses. As of June 2021, the two groups had still not come to an agreement regarding staffing levels. The management of the hospital claims that the demands from the Union's end are "unreasonable" and claimed that the hospital has "one of the most generous staffing ratios in the state". However, the union representatives rejected such a claim, arguing that nurses routinely have to attend to five patients at a time and that the staffing levels at the nearby UMass Memorial Medical Center are lower than those at Saint Vincent. During the course of the strike while being in the negotiation with the union representatives, the management of Saint Vincent started to replace the striking nurses from May 2021. As of October 2021, all parties have reached an agreement, with the exception of Tenet Healthcare's refusal to lay off the replacement nurses.

== Photo gallery ==
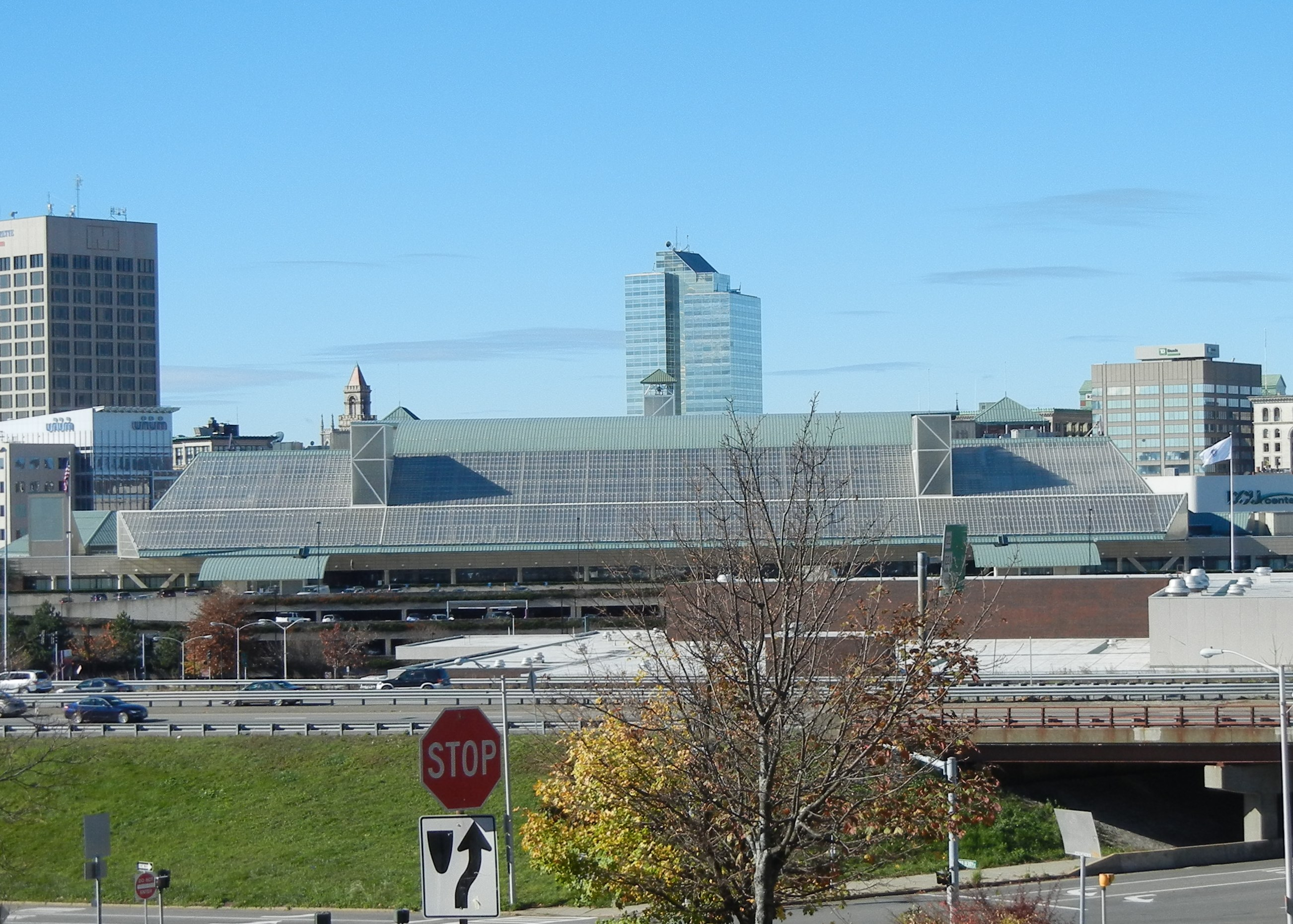
East Façade
