= Caitlin Raymond International Registry =

- UMass Memorial HealthCare

Geography
- Location: 100 North Parkway # 105, Worcester MA 01605, Massachusetts, United States
- Coordinates: 42.275876°N 71.762116°W

Organization
- Type: Registry

History
- Founded: 1986
- Closed: September 30, 2013

Links
- Website: http://www.crir.org/
- Lists: Hospitals in Massachusetts

The Caitlin Raymond International Registry (CRIR) was a bone marrow registry that was a subsidiary of the UMass Memorial Health Ventures Inc in Worcester, Massachusetts.

== Organization ==
The officers of CRIR are Gary Lapidas, Robert Feldmann, and Francis Smith and the organization's directors are John Budd, Brian Carroll, Frederick Crocker, William Kelleher, Gary Lapidas, John O'Brien, and William Sullivan.

== Criticism ==
The registry became the target of criticism when it was discovered that the UMass lab was billing the insurance of potential donors $700–$1500 and as much as $4336 per screening. (Most labs charge about $100 for similar screening.) CRIR has also been criticized for spending up to $60,000 a week to hire models with blue wigs and high heels to lure donors and for paying its top executive, Joanne Raymond, over $200,000 in annual salary and benefits. The registry reported revenues of over $5 million during the same period. CRIR and UMass are currently under investigation by the attorneys general of New Hampshire and Massachusetts.

New Hampshire, Massachusetts and Rhode Island have laws requiring insurers to pay for bone marrow screening.

== Closure ==
On September 30, 2013, the Caitlin Raymond International Registry closed and the donor registry was taken over by NMDP (formerly Be The Match), of Minneapolis, Minnesota, a nonprofit organization operated by the National Marrow Donor Program.

The reason for closure by UMass Memorial Health Care was given as consolidation of business practices and the Caitlin Raymond International Registry was not part of the health care network's core business.

In 2012, CRIR was fined $800,000 by attorneys general in Massachusetts and New Hampshire for "unfair and deceptive acts" related to charging millions of dollars in lab fees. UMass Memorial said the severing of the relationship with CRIR had more to do with finances than it is about the scandal.
