= Soldiers' Home in Holyoke =

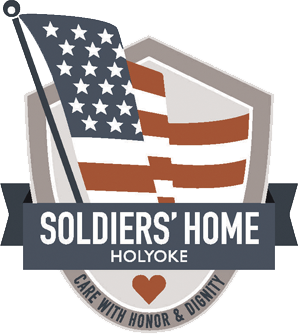

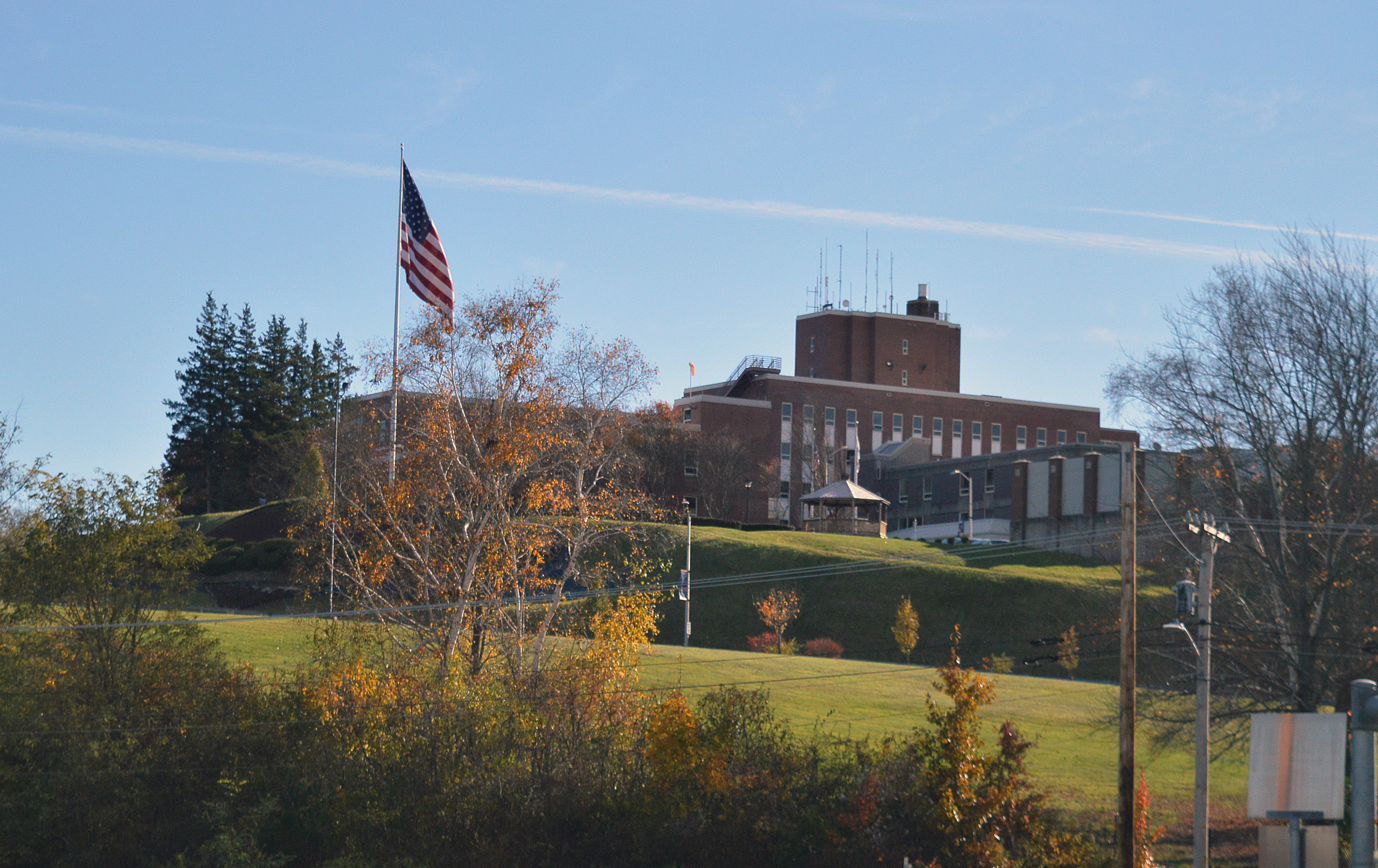
- The Soldiers' Home campus atop Cherry Hill, as seen from I-91

- Location within Massachusetts

Geography
- Location: 110 Cherry Street, Holyoke, Massachusetts, United States
- Coordinates: 42.1987185°N 72.6404414°W

Organization
- Care system: Public
- Type: Veterans' center
- Network: Massachusetts Department of Veterans' Services

Services
- Beds: 277

History
- Founded: April 27, 1952 (dedicated)

Links
- Website: www.mass.gov/orgs/soldiers-home-in-holyoke
- Lists: Hospitals in Massachusetts

The Massachusetts Veterans’ Home in Holyoke, previously named the Soldiers' Home in Holyoke, is a full-service veterans center and hospital located in Holyoke, Massachusetts, which maintains 247 beds in its main nursing facility, and a separate domiciliary care building with 30 full-time residents. The facility provides long-term care and outpatient medical services, as well as dental and social services, and programming and events for veterans. Operated by the Massachusetts Department of Veterans' Services, it is inspected annually by both the state and the United States Department of Veterans' Affairs.

In April 2020, 84 veteran residents—nearly 30 percent of the home's residents—died of COVID-19 in the deadliest outbreak at a long-term care facility in the U.S. during the COVID-19 pandemic. A subsequent independent report found that poor infection control practices and chaotic decisionmaking promoted the spread of the virus within the home. In response to the outbreak the facility is implementing a $2 million overhaul to redesign its floors, reducing the number of beds to 160 in compliance with distancing guidelines.

== History ==
The creation of the Soldiers' Home was a prolonged seven-year process; following the end of World War II, the Commonwealth saw an influx of wounded veterans requiring longterm care. At this time, more Federal facilities were in the process of being set up across the country and the only state facility designated for the task was the Soldiers' Home in Chelsea, which had been set up in 1882. In 1945 the Massachusetts General Court would pass several pieces of legislation, including allowing veterans on Chelsea's growing waiting list to be admitted to other hospitals, the expansion of that facility, and the construction of a new combined residence, community center, and hospital for veterans in the Central/Western regions of Massachusetts. Emphasis was put on the latter's location due to the fact that many veterans from as far away as Pittsfield would have to travel to the Boston area for care.

After a prolonged debate on locations, the number of beds, and the services offered, by 1948 the Holyoke site had been selected. However funding and regulations had led the project to stall, and incoming Governor Paul A. Dever promised to make its construction a priority of his administration. Several years later, the Soldiers' Home was dedicated on April 27, 1952 before a crowd of 15,000, including units from Westover Air Force Base, and former AMVETS national commander Harold Russell. At the facilities opening Governor Dever remarked "the scissors of false economy will never be used to cut the appropriations needed for the maintenance of this outstanding institution erected for the veterans of Massachusetts".

In 2023, the Soldiers' Home was renamed the Massachusetts Veterans’ Home in Holyoke.

=== Outbreak and deaths from COVID-19 ===
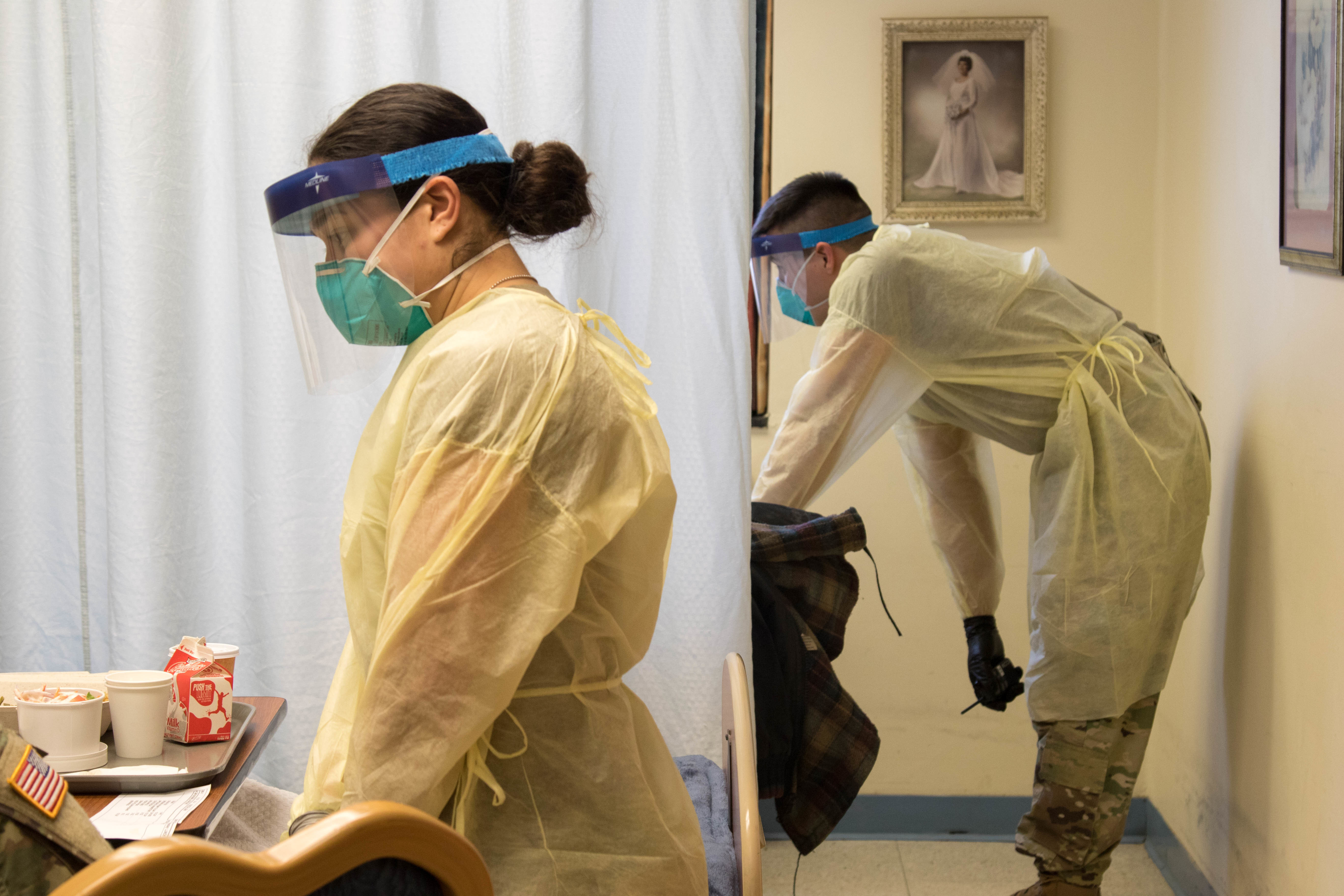
Medics from the Massachusetts National Guard speak with sick residents in the Soldiers' Home on April 1, 2020, augmenting a shortage of staff

In April 2020, 84 veteran residents of the Soldiers' Home in Holyoke died of the novel coronavirus (COVID-19). It was the deadliest outbreak at a long-term care facility in the United States during the COVID-19 pandemic. Another 82 residents and 81 employees tested positive for the disease. In late March, there were 230 residents at the home; by April 29, only about 100 remained.

An 174-page independent report was commissioned by the state in April and released on June 24. It was strongly critical of superintendent Bennett Walsh for mishandling the outbreak by making decisions that were "utterly baffling from an infection-control perspective" and "likely contributed to the death toll during the outbreak."

Walsh, a retired U.S. Marine Corps lieutenant colonel, lacked prior experience in nursing homes and had no medical background. He had been superintendent of the home since 2016. The report also determined that Massachusetts Secretary of Veteran Affairs Francisco Urena had failed to exercise proper oversight over the home to correct problems. The report found that in late March, the home combined a floor of veterans with COVID-19 with a floor of veterans who did not have COVID-19, violating "a basic tenet of infection control" and overcrowding 40 veterans in a space designed for 25. The report also identified a number of other substantially faulty decisions, including failing to isolate residents suspected to have been infected; failing to promptly close the facility's common areas; failing to test residents with symptoms, and rotating staff between units. Among other personnel changes, Walsh was placed on administrative leave in March, and was fired in June after the release of the report. Urena was forced to resign. Governor Charlie Baker accepted all nine reforms proposed by the report and added three more, enacting some with executive action and filing some with the legislature as proposed changes to state law.

On September 25, 2020, Attorney General Maura Healey announced that the former superintendent Bennett Walsh, and former medical director, David Clinton, were indicted by a grand jury on 5 charges each of "Wanton or Reckless Bodily Injury to an Elder or Disabled Person", related to practices alleged to have contributed to the deaths of 84 veterans in the facility's care. The charges against Walsh and Clinton were also described as, "...the first criminal case in the country brought against those involved in nursing homes during the COVID-19 pandemic," by Healey. In November, 2021, a judge dismissed the charges, stating "the evidence does not support a finding of probable cause to believe Mr. Walsh or Mr. Clinton committed any crime". The criminal charges against Walsh and Clinton were reinstated by the Massachusetts Supreme Judicial Court in April, 2023.

In August, 2021, a class action lawsuit on behalf of employees of the Holyoke Soldiers' Home was filed in federal court. The lawsuit names Walsh, Clinton, and three upper-level nursing managers as defendants, and alleges that management placed workers' lives and health in danger. In May, 2022, the state of Massachusetts agreed to a $56 million settlement under which the families of the 84 veterans who died from Covid-19 before June 23, 2020, will receive at least $400,000 each. The group of veterans who contracted Covid-19 and survived past June 23, 2020, will receive lesser amounts.

== Services provided ==
The Soldiers' Home provides services to eligible veterans residing in Massachusetts including outpatient services with physicians and nurse practitioners specializing in optometry, ophthalmology, dentistry, podiatry, urology, and hematology. The facility also maintains its own pharmacy.

Programming is also provided including, but not limited to, bingo, group outings, and social functions. Licensed social service workers also work in residents and members of the veteran community with outreach and coordination of services.

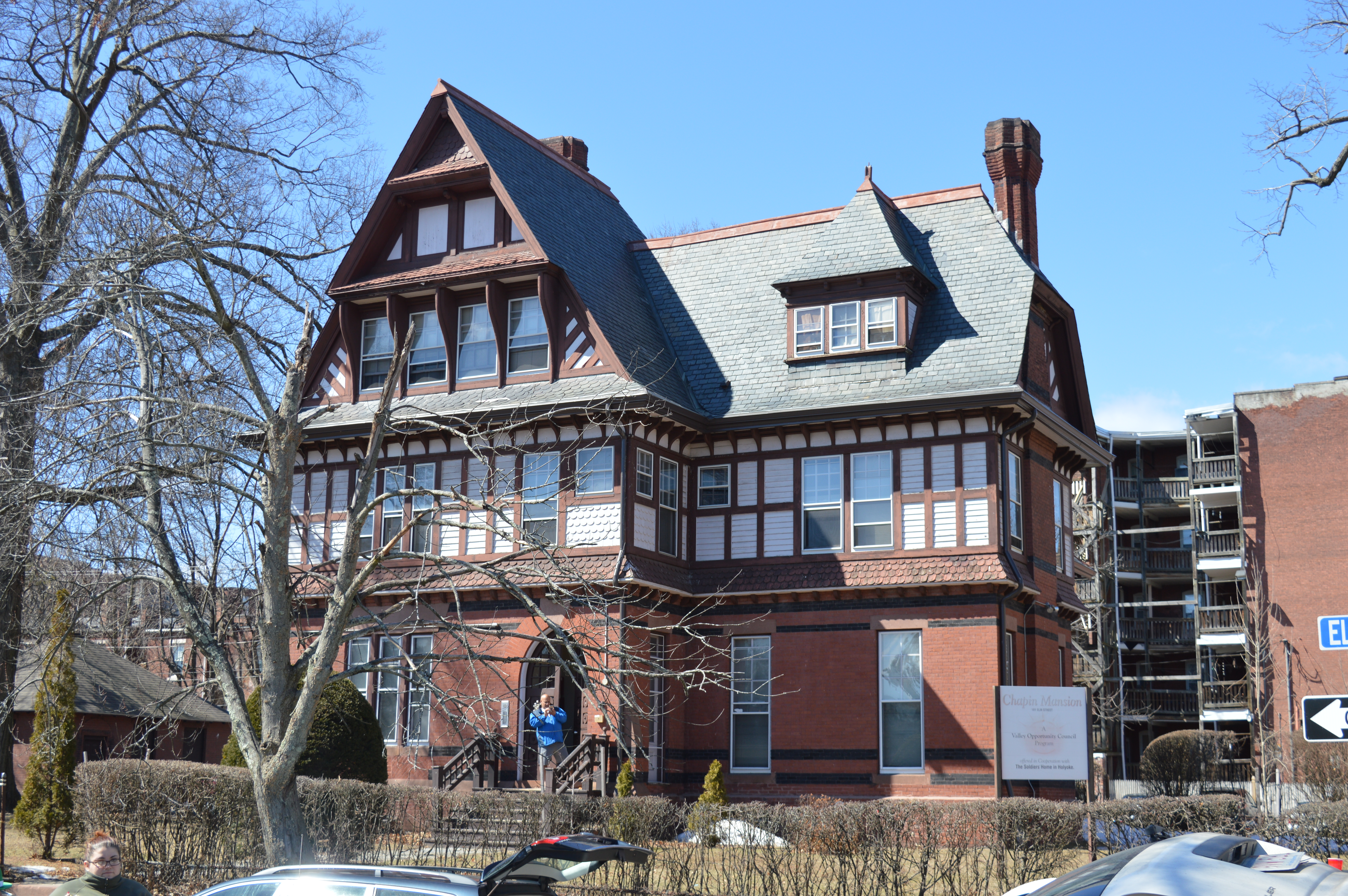
The Chapin Mansion, a satellite facility operated by the Valley Opportunity Council jointly with the Soldiers' Home provides subsidized housing and services for previously-homeless veterans
