= UMass Memorial Health =

Health system in central Massachusetts

Coordinates: 42°16′33.62″N 71°45′43.54″W

- UMass Memorial Health Care
- Formation: March 1998; 28 years ago
- Headquarters: Worcester, Massachusetts
- Region served: Central Massachusetts
- Board Chair: Lynda Young
- President & CEO: Eric Dickson
- Parent organization: University of Massachusetts
- Affiliations: UMass Chan Medical School
- Website: ummhealth.org

UMass Memorial Health (UMM Health) is a non-profit healthcare network based in Worcester, Massachusetts, operated by the University of Massachusetts and primarily serving Central Massachusetts. It is the largest health system in Central Massachusetts, and is the clinical partner of the UMass Chan Medical School.

== History ==
Memorial Hospital on Belmont St, Worcester, MA.

Memorial Hospital was founded in 1871 as the Washburn Dispensary. Worcester industrialist Ichabod Washburn endowed it through a bequest in memory of his wife and daughters. Memorial Hospital moved to its current location in 1888 and later merged with Hahnemann Hospital (founded in 1896) and Holden Hospital to become the Medical Center of Central Massachusetts.

The University of Massachusetts Medical Center (University Hospital) opened in 1974 as the principal teaching hospital of the University of Massachusetts Medical School. UMass Memorial Health Care was formed in 1998 through the merger of Memorial Hospital with the clinical system of the University of Massachusetts UMass Medical Center has operated LifeFlight, New England's first hospital-based air ambulance, for over 30 years.

== About ==
UMass Memorial Health (UMM Health) is a not-for-profit healthcare network in Worcester, Massachusetts that is affiliated with the University of Massachusetts Medical School. It consists of UMass Memorial Medical Center, a Level 1 Trauma Center and the major teaching hospital of UMass Medical School; two community hospitals; and a number of ambulatory clinics throughout Central Massachusetts.

UMMH has over 1,700 active medical staff, and 3,166 registered nurses active in over 22 communities. They offer emergency services such as LifeFlight; long-term care facilities; and home health, rehabilitation and behavioral health services. They host a variety of informational patient seminars and classes on health-related topics throughout the year.

== UMass Memorial Medical Center ==
UMass Memorial Medical Center
- UMass Memorial Health
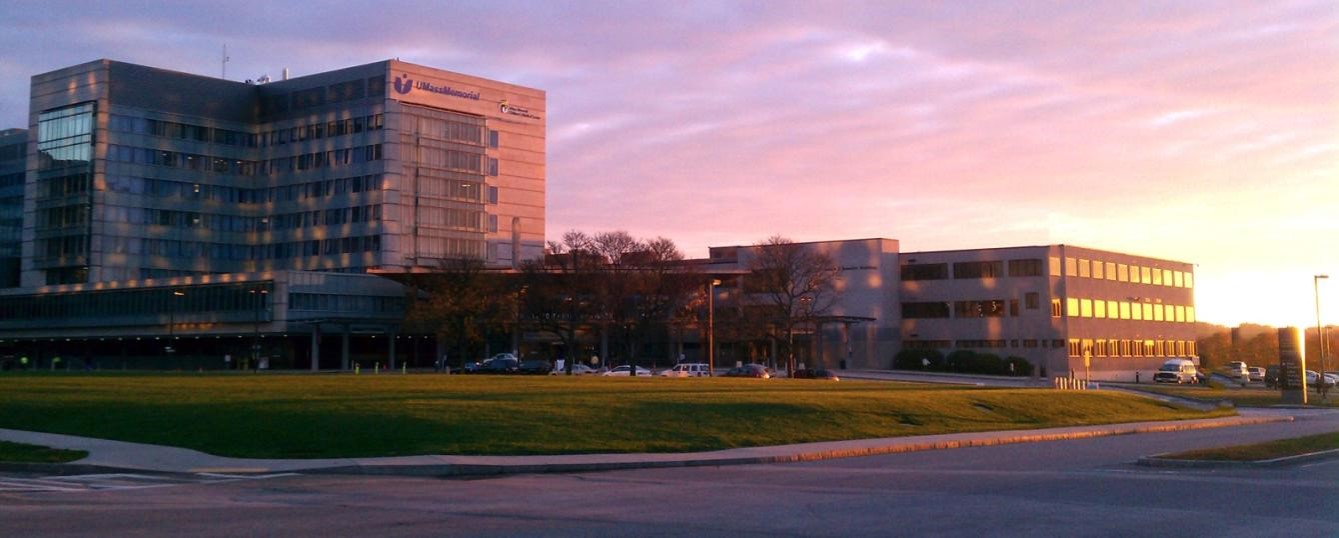
- UMass Memorial's University campus

Geography
- Location: Worcester, Massachusetts, United States

Organization
- Type: Teaching

Services
- Standards: Joint Commission
- Emergency department: Level I trauma center
- Beds: 818

Helipads
- Helipad: Yes

History
- Founded: Memorial Hospital - 1871, UMass Medical Center - 1974; Merged 1998

Links
- Website: UMass Memorial Health
- Lists: Hospitals in Massachusetts

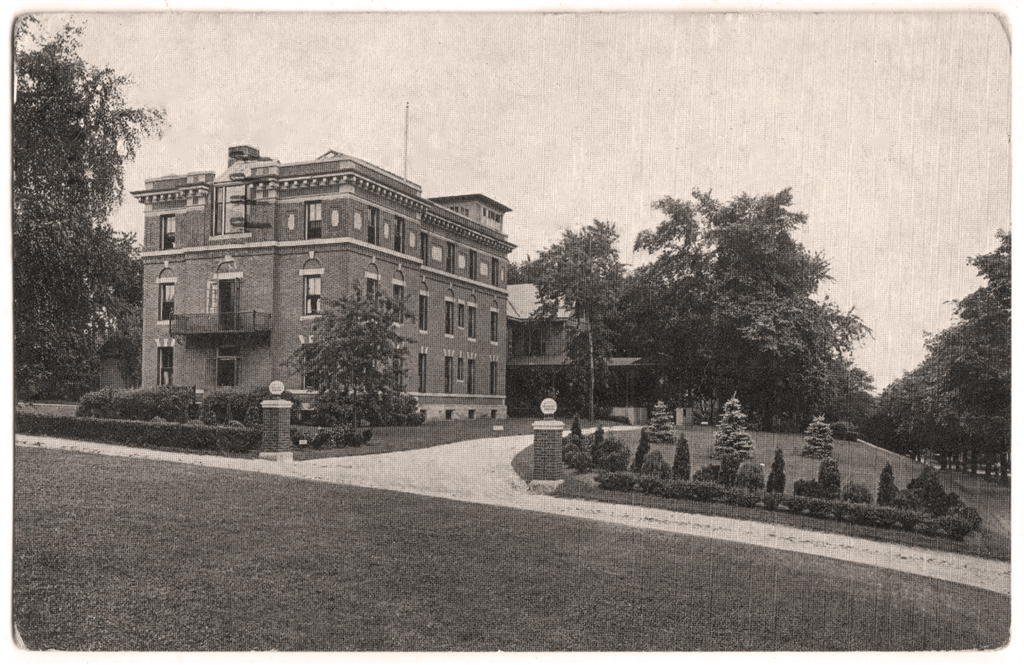
Hahnemann Hospital, founded 1896

UMass Memorial Medical Center (UMMMC) is a designated academic medical center which consists of 818 inpatient beds across three campuses in Worcester, Massachusetts: University Campus, Memorial Campus, and Hahnemann Campus. The largest of these is the University Campus, which is a 640-bed tertiary, research and academic medical center located in Worcester, servicing central Massachusetts. UMMMC is the region's only academic university-level teaching hospital, and is the largest hospital in the system. UMMMC is affiliated with the University of Massachusetts Medical School. Emergency Care at UMass Memorial Medical Center is the only center in the region that is verified by the American College of Surgeons as a Level 1 Adult and Pediatric Trauma Center. They also offer LifeFlight air ambulance for emergency response. Attached to the medical center is the UMass Hospital for Children that treats infants, children, adolescents, and young adults up to the age of 21.

=== History ===
The hospital was known as Memorial Hospital, which was founded in 1871 as the Washburn Dispensary. Worcester industrialist Ichabod Washburn endowed it through a bequest in memory of his wife and daughters. Memorial Hospital moved to its current location in 1888 and later merged with Hahnemann Hospital (founded in 1896) and Holden Hospital to become the Medical Center of Central Massachusetts.

Hahnemann Hospital, founded 1896 The University of Massachusetts Medical Center (University Hospital) opened in 1974 as the principal teaching hospital of the University of Massachusetts Medical School.

In 1991, UMass Medical Center became the home of Worcester EMS services after Worcester City Hospital closed.

UMass Memorial Healthcare was formed in 1998 through the merger of Memorial Hospital with the clinical system of the University of Massachusetts. The merger was a result of higher insurance costs and the system has increased hospital revenue and amount of patient beds. UMass Medical Center has operated LifeFlight, New England's first hospital-based air ambulance, for over 30 years.

In 2018, a renovation project to the medical center was completed that included a renovated 250,000 squ. ft of public space. The hospital also renovated patient care units and nurses' stations on all floors to provide updated services to patients and hospital staff alike.

In late February 2020, hospital authorities disclosed that they had a patient under quarantine at UMass Memorial Medical Center after traveling to China. The hospital has since started a program to prepare for higher amounts of COVID-19 cases.

In March 2020, Blue Cross Blue Shield of Massachusetts chose UMass Memorial Medical Center as a Blue Distinction Center for multiple specialties because of the hospitals' dedication to patient safety and better health outcomes.

== UMass Memorial Health Children's Medical Center ==
The UMass Memorial Health Children's Medical Center is a pediatric acute care hospital located in Worcester, Massachusetts. The hospital has 101 beds and is affiliated with the University of Massachusetts Medical School. The hospital is a member of UMass Memorial Health and provides comprehensive pediatric specialties and subspecialties to pediatric patients aged 0–21 throughout central Massachusetts. UMass Memorial Children's Medical Center also features the only level 1 pediatric trauma center in the region. The hospital is the only children's hospital in central Massachusetts.

== UMass Memorial Health - HealthAlliance-Clinton Hospital ==
UMass Memorial Health - HealthAlliance-Clinton Hospital has campuses in Clinton, Leominster and Fitchburg, MA. 40 service areas are available at the hospital, which is a full-service, acute care hospital with 163 beds, over 1,600 employees and 400 physicians. The Central New England HealthAlliance also includes the Simonds Sinon Regional Cancer Center, Simonds-Hurd Complementary Care Center, Outpatient physical therapy centers, and a Home health and hospice agency.

== UMass Memorial Health- Marlborough Hospital ==
UMass Memorial Health- Marlborough Hospital has campuses in Marlborough and Southborough, MA. The hospital has 79 licensed beds. Its campus offers a variety of healthcare services including emergency care, comprehensive cardiac care services, surgical services, behavioral health services, diagnostic imaging, intensive care, cancer care, and laboratory services. Its other services include Woman's imaging, MedWorks (Occupational Health), Colonoscopy/endoscopy imaging, and a variety of physician specialists. They also offer physical rehabilitation services in Marlborough.

== Milford Regional Medical Center ==
UMass Memorial Health acquired Milford Regional Medical Center on October 1, 2024.

== Awards and recognition ==
- UMass Memorial Medical Center has ranked as number one hospital in New England for surviving and treating a heart attack for many years. In 2008, the hospital ranked second in the US for heart attack survival.
- UMass Memorial Medical Center was recognized in Becker's Hospital Review (2016 edition) as being in among "100 hospitals and health systems with great heart programs".
- UMass Memorial Medical Center was identified as being amongst the Top 50 Cardiovascular Hospitals in the US by Truven Health Analytics.
- The cardiac surgery program of UMass Memorial Medical Center, UMMHC's flagship hospital, has been awarded the highest quality 3-star rating for performing cardiac bypass graft surgery by the US Society of Thoracic Surgeons (STS) consistently since reporting started in 2006. The hospital has also been awarded the highest 3-star quality rating for aortic valve replacement and combined cardiac surgery. Only 1.6% of US cardiac surgery programs (17 of 1009) in the STS database achieved such high-quality standards in all three categories.
- UMass Memorial Medical Center was the first hospital in Central Massachusetts to offer transcatheter aortic valve replacement and mitral valve repair. It is also among the only hospitals in New England with access to custom manufactured fenestrated endovascular grafts for minimally invasive treatment of thoracoabdominal aortic aneurysms.
- UMass Memorial Medical center has received the award of best Health-system pharmacy by the Massachusetts Society of Health-system pharmacists.
- UMass Memorial received the 11th annual Cheers Award by the Institute for Safe Medication Practices in recognition of the medical center's work to prevent medication errors and promote patient safety. The UMass pharmacy residency program is the largest in New England. UMass Memorial and UMass Medical School offer one of only two postgraduate residency programs in the country dedicated to medication safety.
- Clinton Hospital is consistently rated among the state leaders in patient satisfaction; in 2013 Clinton Hospital was declared the best hospital in New England for patient satisfaction. HealthAlliance hospital ranked number one in safety in Massachusetts by a leading consumer ratings magazine in 2012 and 2013.

== Criticism and restructuring ==
UMass Memorial Health Care faced a downhill financial slide over a 5-year period, starting with an operating surplus of $83 million in 2009 to a $55 million operating loss in the 2013 fiscal year. The organization was criticized for being inefficient. In addition, changes in healthcare reimbursement impacted the Medical Center more severely than other hospitals as its proportion of Medicaid patient business, the state-federal health plan for the poor that tends to be less lucrative for hospitals, is 25% higher than the statewide average (24% in 2012 compared to state average of 19%). The financial decline culminated in the downgrading of the system's rating by Moody's Investors service in 2013.
In response to this criticism and challenges, UMMHC underwent significant restructuring towards a more lean business model. Shedding of assets included the sale of UMass home healthcare and hospice business, UMass outreach laboratories and the Caitlin Raymond International Registry (although dissociation from the latter has been postulated to also relate to the public criticism of the Registry's practices). A number of employee positions (reportedly over 500), predominantly in non-patient contact areas, were also eliminated in an effort to improve system efficiency. In December 2013, UMMHC announced its intent to transfer ownership of Wing Memorial hospital to Baystate Health in Springfield, MA. Following the above changes, along with an effort to standardize clinical and business processes, the system reported a stabilization of its financial position in 2014.

== See also ==
- University of Massachusetts
- University of Massachusetts Medical School
- List of hospitals in Massachusetts
